= List of twin towns and sister cities in Slovenia =

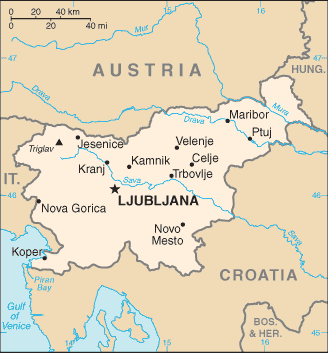
Map of Slovenia

This is a list of municipalities in Slovenia which have standing links to local communities in other countries known as "town twinning" (usually in Europe) or "sister cities" (usually in the rest of the world).

== A ==
Ajdovščina

- Jurong, China

== B ==
Bled

- Brixen, Italy
- Doberdò del Lago, Italy
- Henley-on-Thames, England, United Kingdom
- Velden am Wörther See, Austria
- Vračar (Belgrade), Serbia

Bohinj

- Ramsau am Dachstein, Austria
- Rosegg, Austria
- Stari Grad, Croatia

Bovec

- (Bosnia and Herzegovina) Prijedor, Bosnia and Hercegovina
- Sedegliano, Italy
- Tarcento, Italy

Brda

- Barban, Croatia
- Cormons, Italy
- Feistritz ob Bleiburg, Austria
- Matulji, Croatia
- San Floriano del Collio, Italy

Brežice

- Dobřany, Czech Republic

== C ==
Cankova

- Łączna, Poland
- Šmarješke Toplice, Slovenia

Celje

- Budva, Montenegro
- Ćuprija, Serbia
- (Bosnia and Herzegovina) Doboj, Bosnia and Hercegovina
- Gaziantep, Turkey
- Grevenbroich, Germany
- Šabac, Serbia
- Shchyolkovo, Russia
- Singen, Germany
- Sisak, Croatia
- Slavonski Brod, Croatia
- Sombor, Serbia
- Veles, North Macedonia

Cerklje na Gorenjskem

- Medulin, Croatia
- Petrovec, North Macedonia

Cerkno

- Cassacco, Italy

Črna na Koroškem

- Arnoldstein, Austria

Črnomelj

- Antillo, Italy
- Duga Resa, Croatia
- Negotino, North Macedonia
- Terzo d'Aquileia, Italy

== D ==
Destrnik

- Petrijanec, Croatia

Divača

- San Canzian d'Isonzo, Italy
- Sankt Kanzian am Klopeiner See, Austria

Domžale

- Euclid, United States
- Koprivnica, Croatia
- Rüti, Switzerland

Dravograd

- Frýdlant nad Ostravicí, Czech Republic
- Lučani, Serbia

== G ==
Gorenja Vas–Poljane

- Planá nad Lužnicí, Czech Republic

Gornja Radgona

- Bad Radkersburg, Austria
- Bruchsal, Germany
- Mladenovac (Belgrade), Serbia

Gornji Grad

- Maria Saal, Austria

== H ==
Hrastnik

- Raška, Serbia

== I ==
Idrija

- Abbadia San Salvatore, Italy
- Almadén, Spain
- Aumetz, France
- Labin, Croatia
- Lepoglava, Croatia
- San Luis Potosí, Mexico

Ilirska Bistrica

- Duino-Aurisina, Italy
- Opatija, Croatia

Ivančna Gorica

- Hirschaid, Germany

Izola

- Międzyzdroje, Poland
- Pezinok, Slovakia
- Sutrio, Italy
- Szentgotthárd, Hungary
- Tolentino, Italy
- Treptow-Köpenick (Berlin), Germany
- Tropea, Italy

== J ==
Jesenice

- Nagold, Germany
- Sankt Jakob im Rosental, Austria
- Tarvisio, Italy
- Valjevo, Serbia

== K ==
Kamnik

- Andechs, Germany
- Budva, Montenegro
- Trofaiach, Austria

Kidričevo

- Crikvenica, Croatia

Kočevje

- Halluin, France
- Lübbenau, Germany
- Oer-Erkenschwick, Germany
- Prokuplje, Serbia
- Rab, Croatia
- San Dorligo della Valle, Italy
- Spittal an der Drau, Austria

Koper

- Buzet, Croatia
- Ferrara, Italy
- Jiujiang, China
- Muggia, Italy
- San Dorligo della Valle, Italy
- Žilina, Slovakia

Kranj

- Banja Luka, Bosnia and Herzegovina
- Bitola, North Macedonia
- Büyükçekmece, Turkey
- La Ciotat, France
- Colorado Springs, United States
- Doberdò del Lago, Italy
- Eisenkappel-Vellach, Austria
- Grožnjan, Croatia
- Herceg Novi, Montenegro
- Kočani, North Macedonia
- Kotor Varoš, Bosnia and Herzegovina
- Oldham, England, United Kingdom
- Pula, Croatia
- Rivoli, Italy
- Senta, Serbia
- Villach, Austria
- Zemun (Belgrade), Serbia
- Zhangjiakou, China

Kranjska Gora

- Santa Marinella, Italy
- Trogir, Croatia
- Waasmunster, Belgium

Krško

- Bajina Bašta, Serbia
- Cernavodă, Romania
- Chantepie, France
- Obrigheim, Germany
- Přeštice, Czech Republic

Kungota

- Foëcy, France
- Leutschach an der Weinstraße, Austria

== L ==
Laško

- Mionica, Serbia
- Pliezhausen, Germany
- Trstenik, Serbia

Lendava

- Budapest, Hungary
- Budavár (Budapest), Hungary
- Lenti, Hungary
- Szentgotthárd, Hungary
- Törökszentmiklós, Hungary
- Zalaegerszeg, Hungary

Ljubljana

- Ankara, Turkey
- Athens, Greece
- Baku, Azerbaijan
- Belgrade, Serbia
- Bratislava, Slovakia
- Brussels, Belgium
- Chemnitz, Germany
- Chengdu, China
- Cleveland, United States
- Graz, Austria
- Leverkusen, Germany
- Moscow, Russia
- Moscow Oblast, Russia
- Parma, Italy
- Pesaro, Italy
- Ploče, Croatia
- Rijeka, Croatia
- Sarajevo, Bosnia and Herzegovina
- Skopje, North Macedonia
- Sousse, Tunisia
- (Georgia (country)) Tbilisi, Georgia
- Wiesbaden, Germany
- Zagreb, Croatia

Ljutomer

- Fulnek, Czech Republic
- Užice, Serbia
- Wermsdorf, Germany

Logatec

- Gacko, Bosnia and Herzegovina
- Monrupino, Italy

Lukovica

- Amaroni, Italy
- Sankt Lambrecht, Austria

== M ==
Maribor

- Chongqing, China
- Graz, Austria
- Greenwich, England, United Kingdom
- Hangzhou, China
- Jinan, China
- Kharkiv, Ukraine
- Kraljevo, Serbia
- Marburg, Germany
- Osijek, Croatia
- Pétange, Luxembourg
- Pueblo, United States
- Saint Petersburg, Russia
- Szombathely, Hungary
- Udine, Italy

Medvode

- Crest, France

Metlika

- Ronchi dei Legionari, Italy
- Wagna, Austria

Mežica

- Arnoldstein, Austria
- Xuzhou, China

Moravske Toplice

- Biograd na Moru, Croatia

Murska Sobota

- Bethlehem, United States
- Ingolstadt, Germany
- Paraćin, Serbia
- Podstrana, Croatia
- Turnov, Czech Republic

== N ==
Naklo

- Nakło nad Notecią, Poland

Nova Gorica

- Aleksandrovac, Serbia
- Gevgelija, North Macedonia
- Klagenfurt, Austria
- Latina, Italy
- Otočac, Croatia
- San Vendemiano, Italy

Novo Mesto

- Bihać, Bosnia and Herzegovina
- Herceg Novi, Montenegro
- Langenhagen, Germany
- Toruń, Poland
- Trnava, Slovakia
- Vilafranca del Penedès, Spain
- Yixing, China

== O ==
Ormož

- Bytom, Poland

== P ==
Piran

- Acqualagna, Italy
- Aquileia, Italy
- Bjugn, Norway
- Castel Goffredo, Italy
- Indianapolis, United States
- Karşıyaka, Turkey
- Mangalia, Romania
- Ohrid, North Macedonia
- Porano, Italy
- Sittersdorf, Austria
- Tivat, Montenegro
- Valletta, Malta
- Vis, Croatia

Pivka

- Durach, Germany

Postojna

- Supetar, Croatia

Ptuj

- Aranđelovac, Serbia
- Banská Štiavnica, Slovakia
- Burghausen, Germany
- Ohrid, North Macedonia
- Saint-Cyr-sur-Loire, France
- Varaždin, Croatia

Puconci

- Ćićevac, Serbia
- Tordas, Hungary
- Zabok, Croatia

== R ==
Radlje ob Dravi

- Crikvenica, Croatia

Radovljica

- Ivančice, Czech Republic
- Sondrio, Italy
- Svilajnac, Serbia

Ravne na Koroškem

- Đakovo, Croatia

Ribnica

- Arcevia, Italy

Ruše

- Fažana, Croatia
- Rozier-en-Donzy, France
- Těšany, Czech Republic

== S ==
Šempeter-Vrtojba

- Keutschach am See, Austria
- Medea, Italy
- Romans d'Isonzo, Italy

Šentjernej

- Svrljig, Serbia

Šentjur

- Jirkov, Czech Republic
- Neu-Anspach, Germany
- Požega, Serbia
- Saint-Florent-sur-Cher, France

Sevnica

- Nové Zámky, Slovakia

Sežana

- Montbrison, France
- Rab, Croatia
- Sant'Ambrogio di Valpolicella, Italy
- Sant'Ambrogio sul Garigliano, Italy

Škofja Loka is a member of the Douzelage, a town twinning association of towns across the European Union. Škofja Loka also has several other twin towns.

Douzelage

- Agros, Cyprus
- Altea, Spain
- Asikkala, Finland
- Bad Kötzting, Germany
- Bellagio, Italy
- (Republic of Ireland) Bundoran, Ireland
- Chojna, Poland
- Granville, France
- Holstebro, Denmark
- Houffalize, Belgium
- Judenburg, Austria
- Kőszeg, Hungary
- Marsaskala, Malta
- Meerssen, Netherlands
- Niederanven, Luxembourg
- Oxelösund, Sweden
- Preveza, Greece
- Rokiškis, Lithuania
- Rovinj, Croatia
- Sesimbra, Portugal
- Sherborne, England, United Kingdom
- Sigulda, Latvia
- Siret, Romania
- Sušice, Czech Republic
- Tryavna, Bulgaria
- Türi, Estonia
- Zvolen, Slovakia

Other

- Freising, Germany
- Maasmechelen, Belgium
- Medicina, Italy
- Obervellach, Austria
- Savogna d'Isonzo, Italy
- Smederevska Palanka, Serbia
- Tábor, Czech Republic
- Zell, Austria

Slovenj Gradec

- Český Krumlov, Czech Republic
- Gornji Milanovac, Serbia
- Hauzenberg, Germany
- Myōkō, Japan
- Morphou, Cyprus
- Vöcklabruck, Austria

Slovenske Konjice

- Biograd na Moru, Croatia
- Gornja Stubica, Croatia
- Hlohovec, Slovakia
- Hranice, Czech Republic
- Kosjerić, Serbia
- Križevci, Croatia
- Sollefteå, Sweden
- Tolfa, Italy
- Zvyozdny gorodok, Russia

Šmarješke Toplice

- Cankova, Slovenia
- Teplice nad Bečvou, Czech Republic

== T ==
Tolmin

- Vicchio, Italy
- Villach, Austria

Trbovlje

- Lazarevac (Belgrade), Serbia
- Sallaumines, France
- Valandovo, North Macedonia

Tržič

- Dabas, Hungary
- Ferlach, Austria
- Ludbreg, Croatia
- Sainte-Marie-aux-Mines, France
- Zaječar, Serbia

== V ==
Velenje

- Albacete, Spain
- Esslingen am Neckar, Germany
- Lukavac, Bosnia and Herzegovina
- Neath Port Talbot, Wales, United Kingdom
- Pljevlja, Montenegro
- Prievidza, Slovakia
- Prijedor, Bosnia and Herzegovina
- Schiedam, Netherlands
- Split, Croatia
- Valjevo, Serbia
- Vienne, France

Vipava

- Ilok, Croatia
- Lumbin, France

Vrhnika

- Čapljina, Bosnia and Herzegovina
- Gonars, Italy
- Iolcus, Greece

== Z ==
Zagorje ob Savi

- Aleksinac, Serbia
- Havířov, Czech Republic
- Kemnath, Germany
- Omiš, Croatia
- Stari Grad, Croatia

Žalec

- Žatec, Czech Republic

Zreče

- Rača, Serbia
- Sedbergh, England, United Kingdom

Žužemberk

- Čachtice, Slovakia
- Golubac, Serbia
- Pregrada, Croatia
