= Sonnegger See =

Artificial lake in Carinthia, Austria

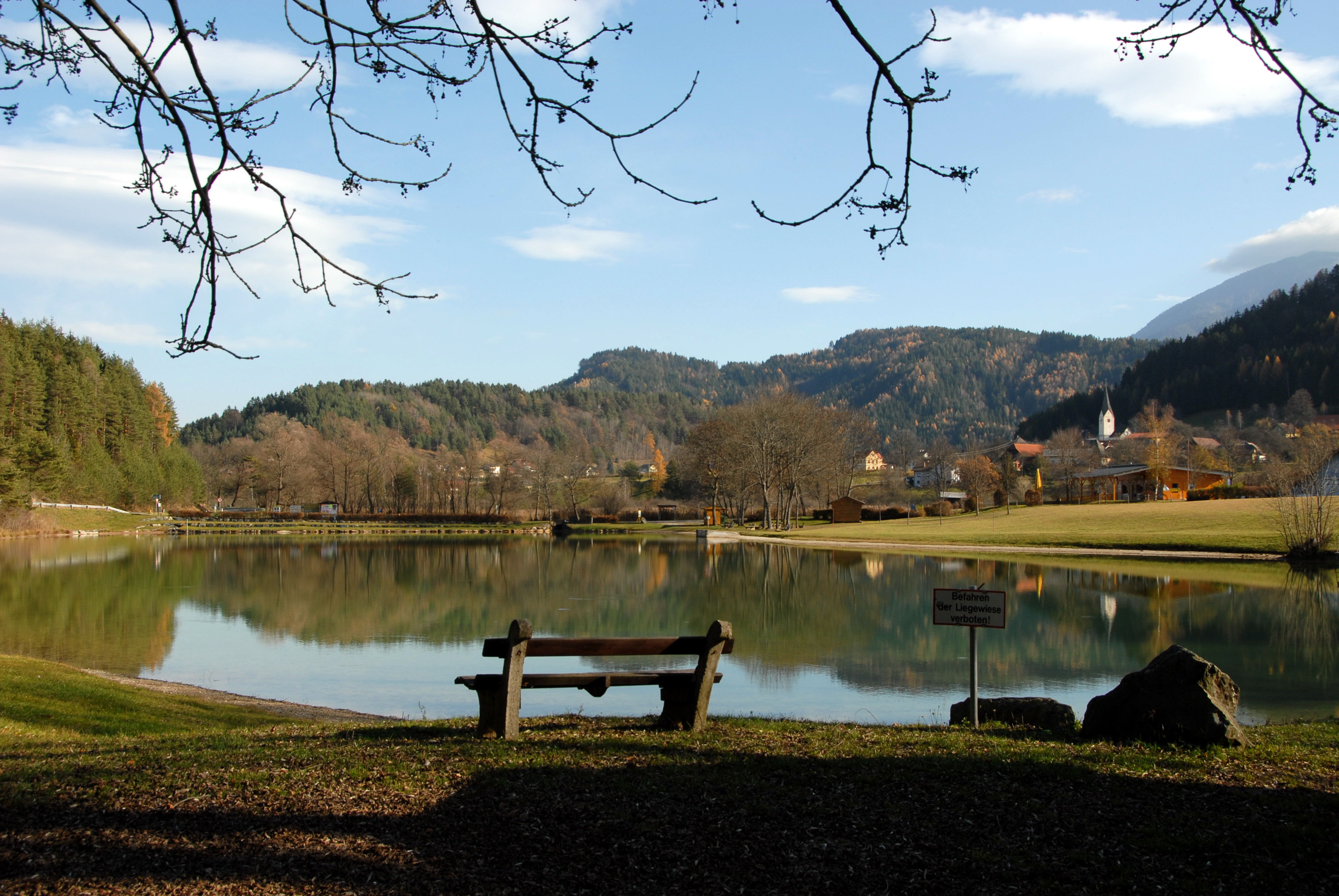

- Location within Kärnten
- Location: Sittersdorf, Jauntal, Carinthia, Austria
- Coordinates: 46°33′13.1″N 14°37′39.1″E
- Primary inflows: Artificial Inflow
- Surface area: 0.017 km^{2} (0.0066 sq mi)
- Max. depth: 4.5 m (15 ft)
- Surface elevation: 468 m (1,535 ft)

Sonnegger See, also known as Lake Sonnegger, is an artificial lake, near Juntal in Austria. It rests in the municipality of Sittersdorf, in Carinthia. The lake was created in 1966, and is enclosed on the East and West sides by a dam. It was not designed for fishing; instead it is much better for swimming.
