= Neuhaus, Carinthia =

Neuhaus Suha
- Municipality
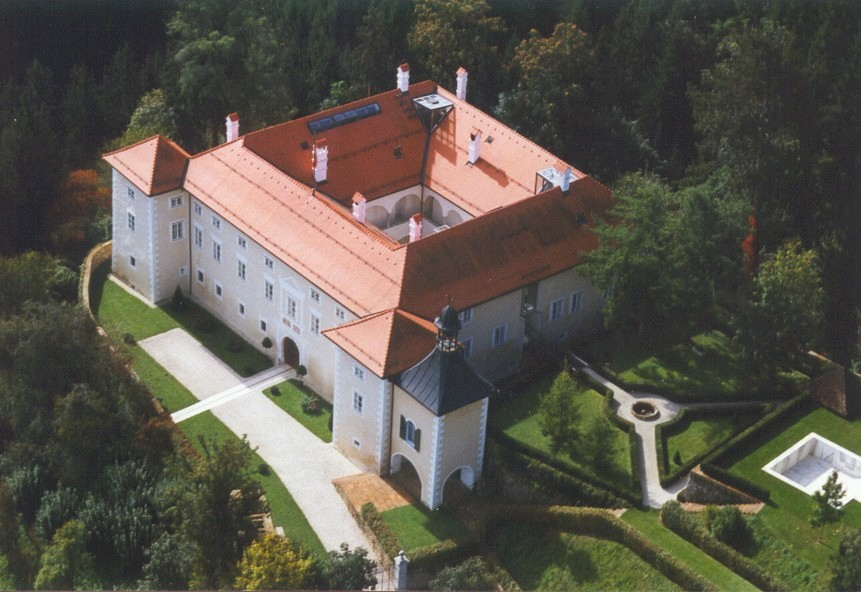

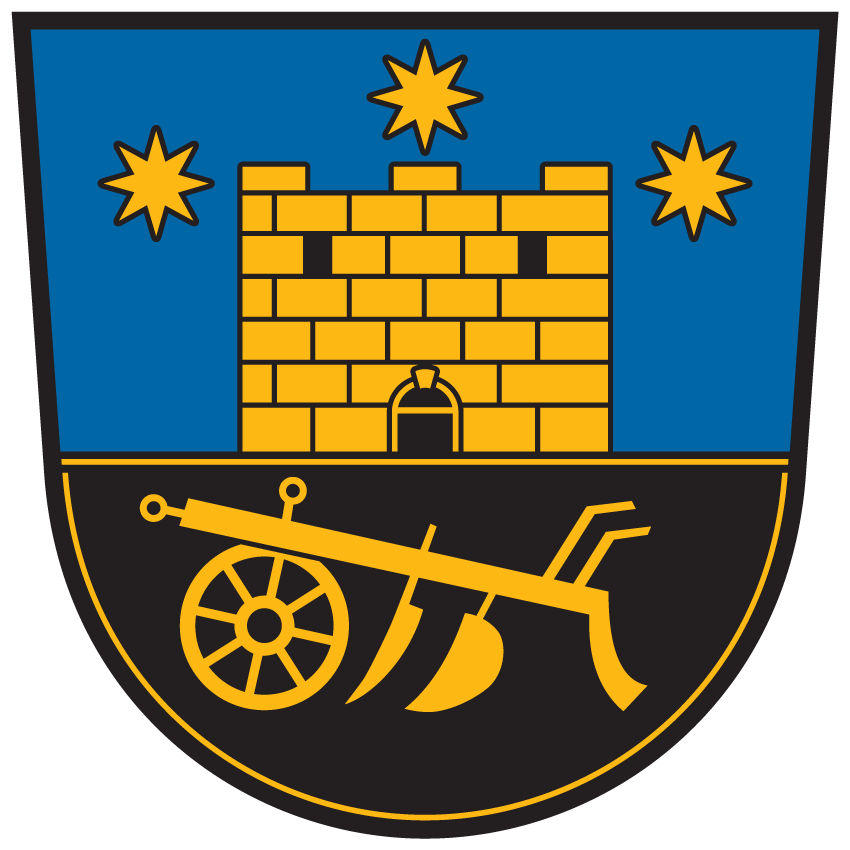
- Coat of arms

- Location within Austria
- Coordinates: 46°38′N 14°53′E
- Country: Austria
- State: Carinthia
- District: Völkermarkt

Government
  - Mayor: Gerhard Visotschnig

Area
  - Total: 36.34 km^{2} (14.03 sq mi)
- Elevation: 442 m (1,450 ft)

Population (2018-01-01)
  - Total: 1,040
  - Density: 28.6/km^{2} (74.1/sq mi)
- Time zone: UTC+1 (CET)
  - Summer (DST): UTC+2 (CEST)
- Postal code: 9155
- Area code: 04356
- Website: www.neuhaus.cc

Neuhaus (Slovene: Suha) is a small town in the Austrian state of Carinthia southeast of Klagenfurt, in the district of Völkermarkt, about 4 km from the border with Slovenia.

== Geography ==
The Municipality of Neuhaus is located in the extreme east of the Jaun Valley south of the Drava River.

=== Makeup of the municipality ===
Neuhaus is part of a cadastral district that includes Neuhaus, Graditschach, Berg ob Leifling, Leifling, Pudlach, Heiligenstadt, and Schwabegg. The municipality includes the following 16 settlements (2001 census):

- Bach (Sln. Potoče) (89)
- Berg ob Leifling (Sln. Libeliška gora) (35)
- Draugegend (Sln. Pri Dravi) (0)
- Graditschach (Sln. Gradiče) (38)
- Hart (Sln. Dobrava) (63)
- Heiligenstadt (Sln. Sveto Mesto) (23)
- Illmitzen (Sln. Ivnik) (37)
- Kogelnigberg (Sln. Kogelska Gora) (32)
- Leifling (Sln. Libeliče) (33)
- Motschula (Sln. Močula) (108)
- Neuhaus (Sln. Suha) (113)
- Oberdorf (Sln. Gornja vas) (69)
- Pudlach (Sln. Podlog) (334)
- Schwabegg (Sln. Žvabek) (197)
- Unterdorf (Sln. Dolnja vas) (42)
- Wesnitzen (Sln. Beznica) (23)

=== Neighboring municipalities ===
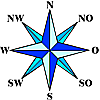
Ruden	Lavamünd
Bleiburg	Ravne na Koroškem	Dravograd

== History ==
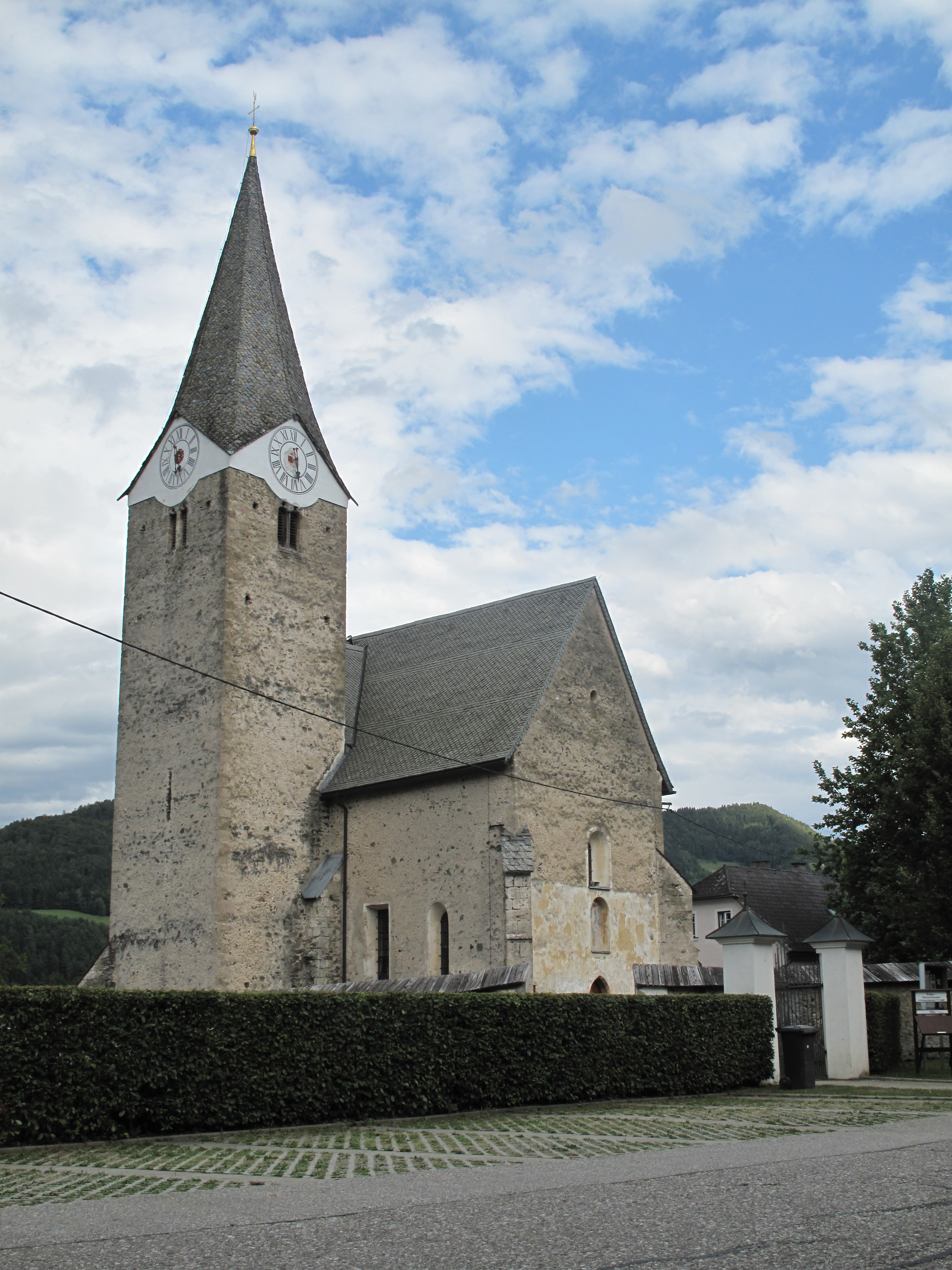
Neuhaus, church

Neuhaus (Newenhavse) was first mentioned in 1288; the settlement of Leifling first in 1154 as Liwuelich and the settlement of Schwabegg as Castrum Swabec in 1212. The Counts of Heunburg built Neuhaus Castle at the end of the 13th century.

In 1958 the current Municipality of Neuhaus was established by combining the previously independent municipalities of Leifling und Schwabegg.

== Population ==
According to the 2001 census, the Municipality of Neuhaus had 1,236 inhabitants, of which 96.9% are Austrian and 1.0% German citizens. 13.2% are Carinthian Slovenes.

96.5% of the population is Roman Catholic and 1.4% is Lutheran. 1.3% have no religious affiliation.

== Sights ==
- Neuhaus Castle
- Leifling Castle
- Patek-Mühle Farming Museum
- Heiligenstadt Pilgrimage Church

== Politics ==
=== Municipal council ===
The municipal council has 15 members and is structured as follows after the 2003 municipal elections:

- Social Democratic Party of Austria - 7
- Austrian People's Party - 5
- Write-in - 2
- Enotna Lista - 1

The mayor, directly elected, is Gerhard Visotschnig (Social Democratic Party).

=== Coat of arms ===
The coat of arms of Neuhaus shows the golden tower of the castle (today's Neuhaus Castle) and the three golden stars of the Counts of Heunburger, who had these in their coat of arms and had their center of power in the southeast Jaun Valley. The golden plow represents agriculture as the historically and currently most important economic activity in the municipality.

The coat of arms and banner were adopted by the municipality on 2 June 1980. The flag is blue and yellow and bears the coat of arms.
