= Griffen, Austria =

Griffen
- Municipality
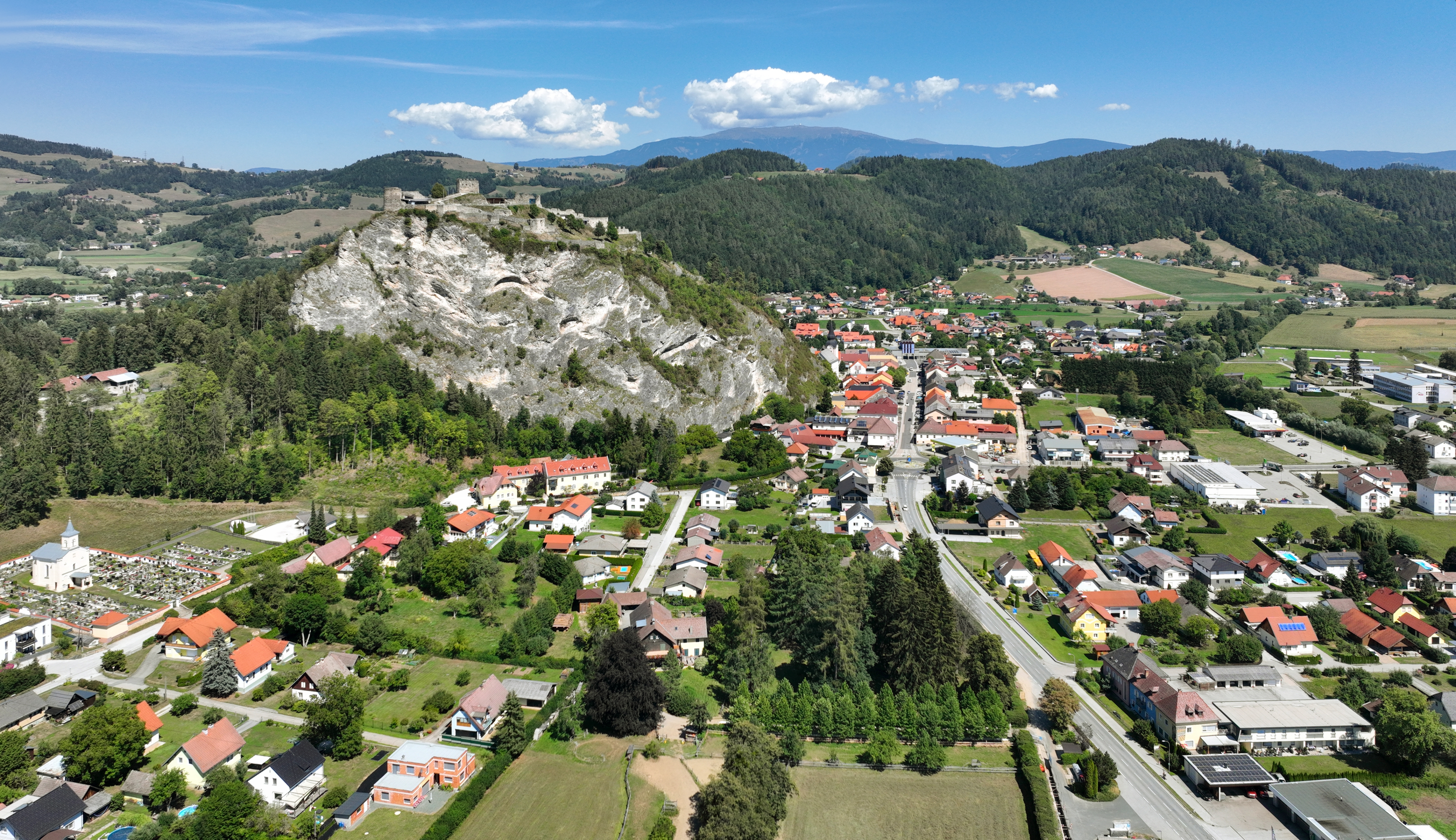
- West-southwest view of Griffen

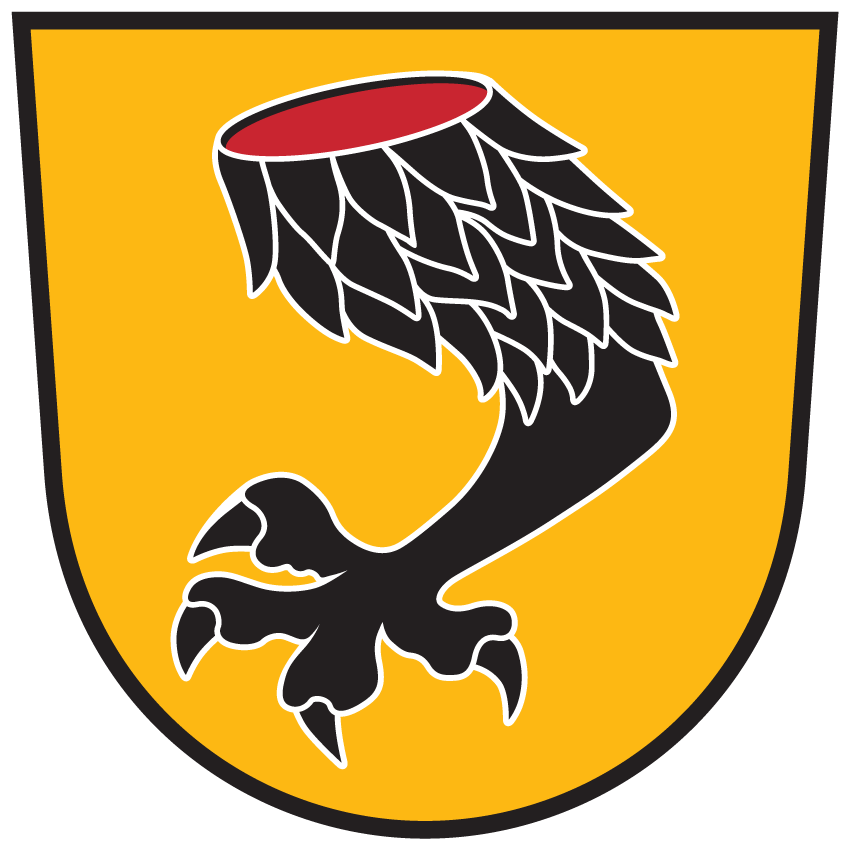
- Coat of arms

- Location within Austria
- Coordinates: 46°42′N 14°44′E
- Country: Austria
- State: Carinthia
- District: Völkermarkt

Government
  - Mayor: Josef Müller (ÖVP)

Area
  - Total: 74.75 km^{2} (28.86 sq mi)
- Elevation: 484 m (1,588 ft)

Population (2018-01-01)
  - Total: 3,466
  - Density: 46.37/km^{2} (120.1/sq mi)
- Time zone: UTC+1 (CET)
  - Summer (DST): UTC+2 (CEST)
- Postal code: 9112
- Area code: 04233
- Website: www.griffen.at

Griffen (Slovene: Grebinj) is a market town in the district of Völkermarkt in the Austrian state of Carinthia.

== Geography ==
Griffen lies in the wide Jauntal valley of the Drava River, between the Klagenfurt basin in the west and the Lavant Valley in the north.

The municipal area comprises the cadastral communities of Griffnerthal, Großenegg (Tolsti Vrh), Haberberg (Gabrje), Kaunz (Homec), Kleindörfl (Mala vas), Pustritz (Pustrica), Sankt Kollmann (Šentkolman), Wölfnitz (Golovica), and Wriesen (Brezje). It is further subdivided into 35 villages and hamlets.

== History ==
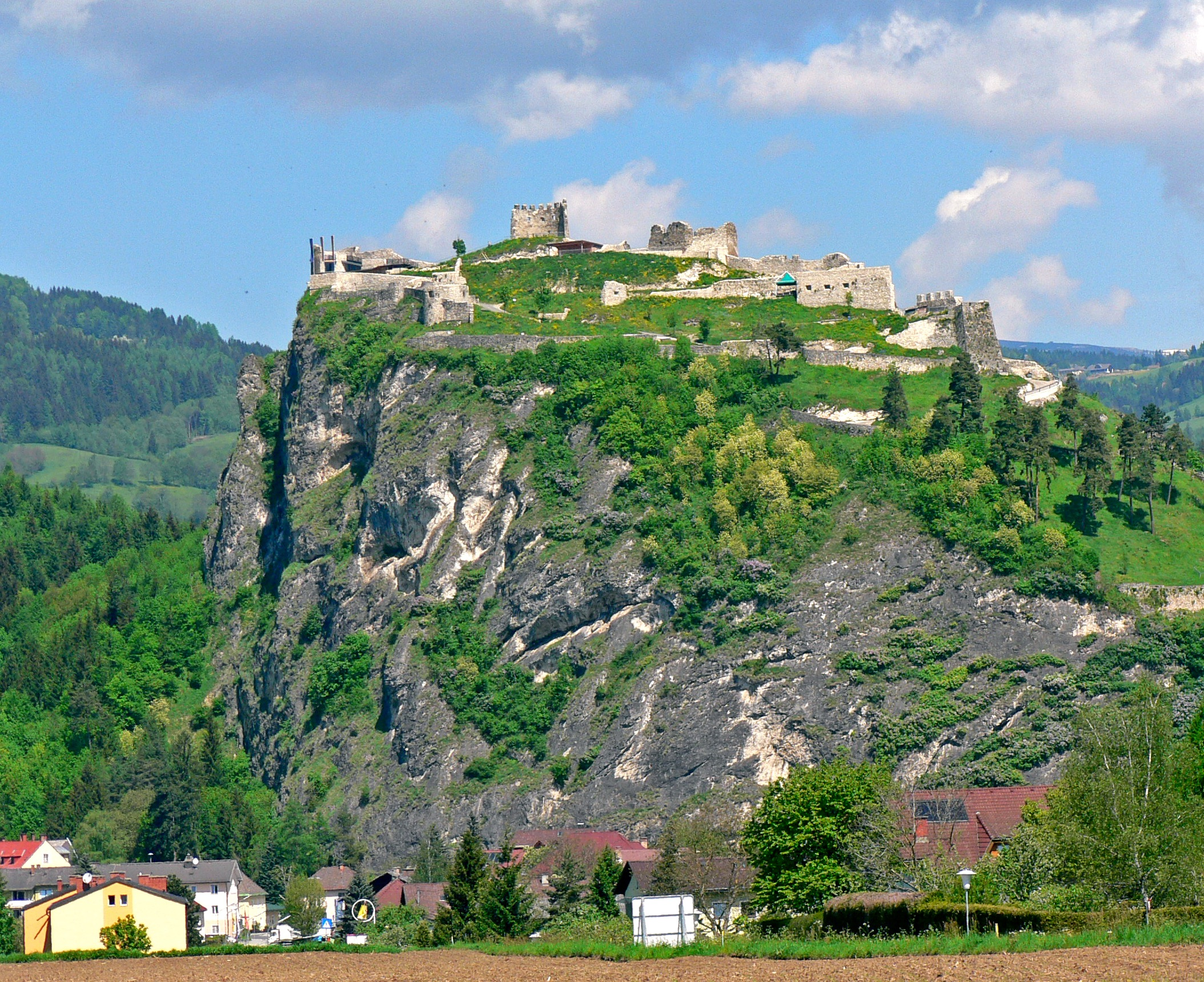
Griffen castle ruins

From the 7th century onwards, the Jauntal (Slovene: Podjuna) area was a centre of the Slavic settlement of the Eastern Alps and part of the early medieval principality of Carantania. Up to today it remains a core territory of the Carinthian Slovenes.

The settlement was first mentioned in an 822 deed, after Carantania had been incorporated into the Carolingian Empire and evolved to the Bavarian March of Carinthia. From 1124 onwards Bishop Otto of Bamberg had Griffen Castle erected within the Carinthian possessions of the prince-bishopric, received from the hands of King Henry II of Germany in 1007. The Grivena fortress was acknowledged as a Bamberg estate by Emperor Frederick Barbarossa in 1160. From 1237 Griffen held market rights.

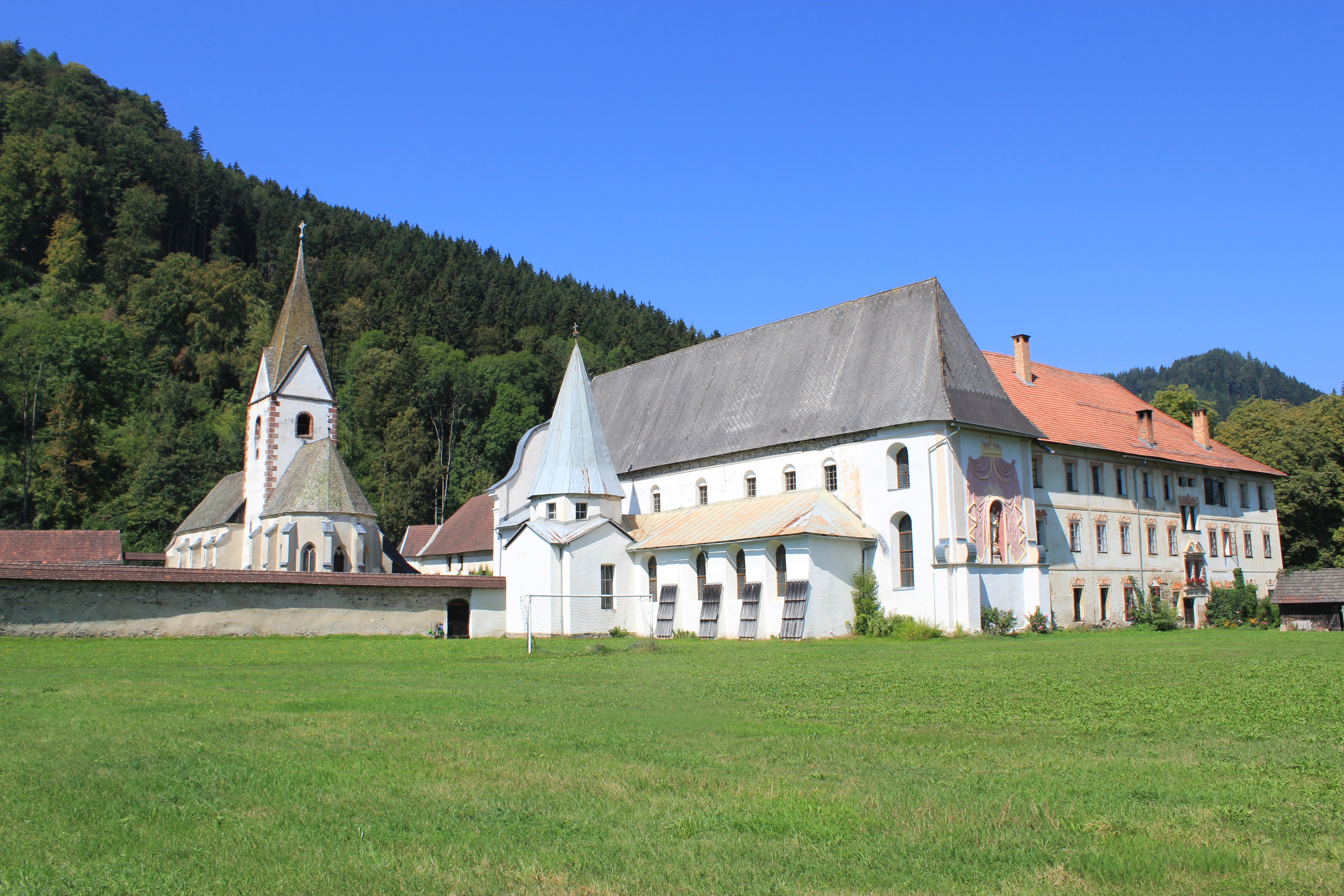
Griffen Abbey

From about 1233 the Bamberg bishops had the Romanesque Griffen parish church enlarged and rebuilt as a Premonstratensian monastery. The first canons descended from Vessra Abbey in the Franconian County of Henneberg. The monastery complex was completed in 1272 and significantly enlarged by Baroque buildings in the 17th century. Griffen remained the only Premonstratensian abbey in the Inner Austrian lands until its abolition under the rule of Emperor Joseph II in 1786.

Griffen itself remained a possession of the Prince-Bishopric of Bamberg until the estates were purchased by Empress Maria Theresa in 1759. The castle decayed and today lies in ruins. The present-day municipality emerged in 1850, it temporarily also comprised neighbouring Ruden. After the Carinthian referendum of 1920, multiple tensions arose between the Slovene- and German-speaking population, which culminated in the persecution and displacement of Carinthian Slovenes after the Austrian Anschluss to Nazi Germany in 1938.

== Politics ==
Seats in the municipal assembly (Gemeinderat) as of 2009 local elections:

- Austrian People's Party (ÖVP): 14
- Alliance for the Future of Austria (BZÖ) and Independents: 5
- Social Democratic Party of Austria (SPÖ): 4

== Notable people ==
The village of Altenmarkt (Stara vas) is the birthplace of Austrian writer Peter Handke, winner of the Nobel Prize in Literature.
