= Galizien =

Galizien may refer to:

- Galicia (Eastern Europe), German: Galizien
- 14th Waffen Grenadier Division of the SS (1st Galician)
- Gallizien, town in Austria
