= Völkermarkt =

Völkermarkt Velikovec
- Municipality
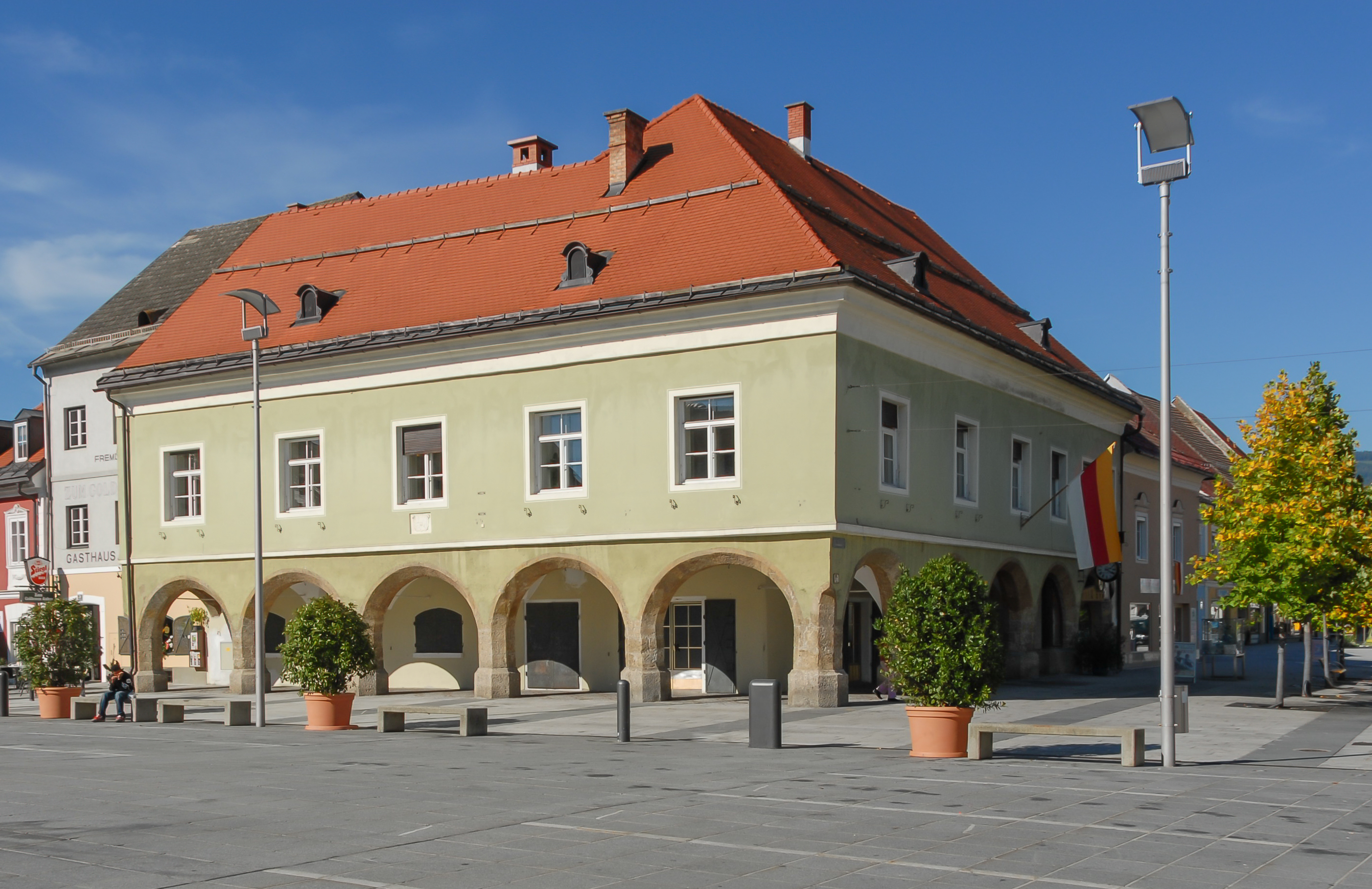
- Main square with the Old Town Hall

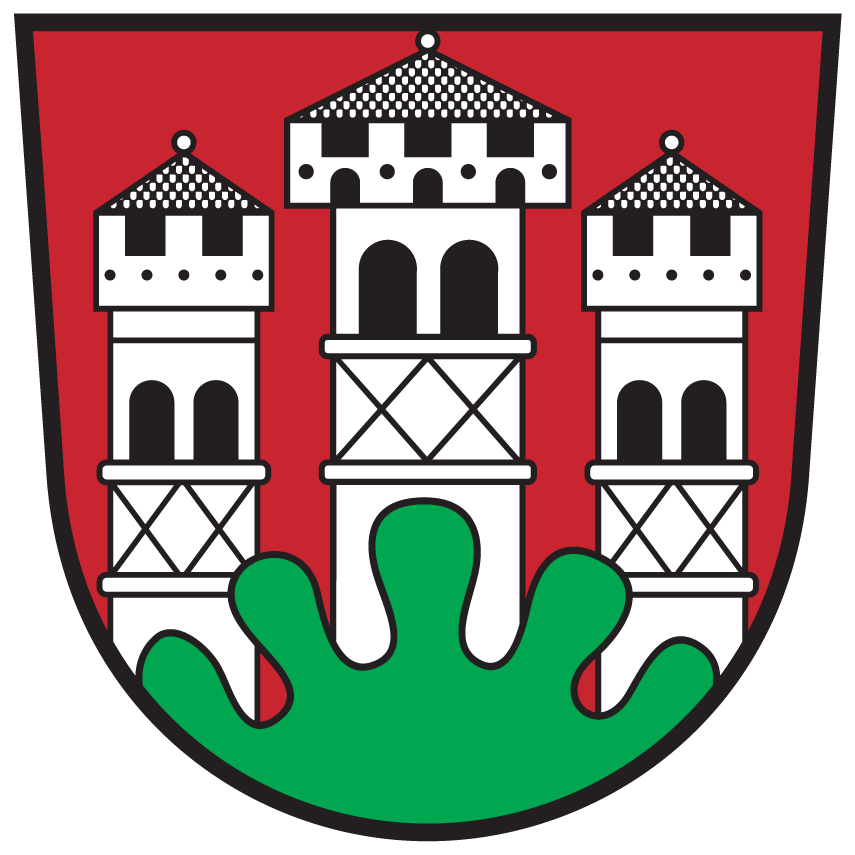
- Coat of arms

- Location within Austria
- Coordinates: 46°40′N 14°38′E
- Country: Austria
- State: Carinthia
- District: Völkermarkt

Government
  - Mayor: Markus Lakounigg (SPÖ)

Area
  - Total: 137.33 km^{2} (53.02 sq mi)
- Elevation: 462 m (1,516 ft)

Population (2025-10-31)
  - Total: 10,823
  - Density: 78.810/km^{2} (204.12/sq mi)
- Time zone: UTC+1 (CET)
  - Summer (DST): UTC+2 (CEST)
- Postal code: 9100
- Area code: 04232
- Vehicle registration: VK
- Website: https://voelkermarkt.gv.at/

Völkermarkt (Austrian German pronunciation: [ˈfœlkɐmarkt]; Slovene: Velikovec) is a town of about 11,000 inhabitants in the Austrian state of Carinthia, the administrative capital of Völkermarkt District. It is located within the Drava valley east of the Carinthian capital Klagenfurt, north of the Karawanken mountain range.

== Subdivisions ==
The municipality of Völkermarkt comprises 26 Katastralgemeinden (Slovene names in brackets):

- Admont-Lassein (Volmat-Lesine)
- Bei der Drau (Pri Dravi)
- Greuth (Rute)
- Gurtschitschach (Gurčiče)
- Haimburg (Vovbre)
- Höhenbergen (Homberk)
- Kaltenbrunn (Mrzla Voda)
- Klein St. Veit (Mali Šentvid)
- Korb (Korpiče)
- Mittertrixen (Srednje Trušnje)
- Mühlgraben (Mlinski Graben)
- Neudenstein (Črni Grad)
- Niedertrixen (Spodnje Trušnje)

- Ob der Drau (Na Dravo)
- Rakollach (Rakole)
- Ritzing (Ricinje)
- Ruhstatt (Ruštat)
- St. Jakob (Šentjakob)
- St. Peter am Wallersberg (Šentpeter na Vašinjah)
- St. Ruprecht (Šentrupert)
- Tainach (Tinje)
- Töllerberg (Telenberk)
- Völkermarkt (Velikovec)
- Waisenberg (Važenberk)
- Wandelitzen (Vodovnica)
- Weinberg (Vinograd)

== History ==
The area, once part of the ancient Noricum province, in the 7th century was resettled by Slavic tribes, who lived within the Principality of Carantania. The migration concentrated around the former Roman settlement of Juenna (near present-day Globasnitz) in an area later called Jaun Valley. Up to today, significant parts of the population refer to themselves as Carinthian Slovenes.

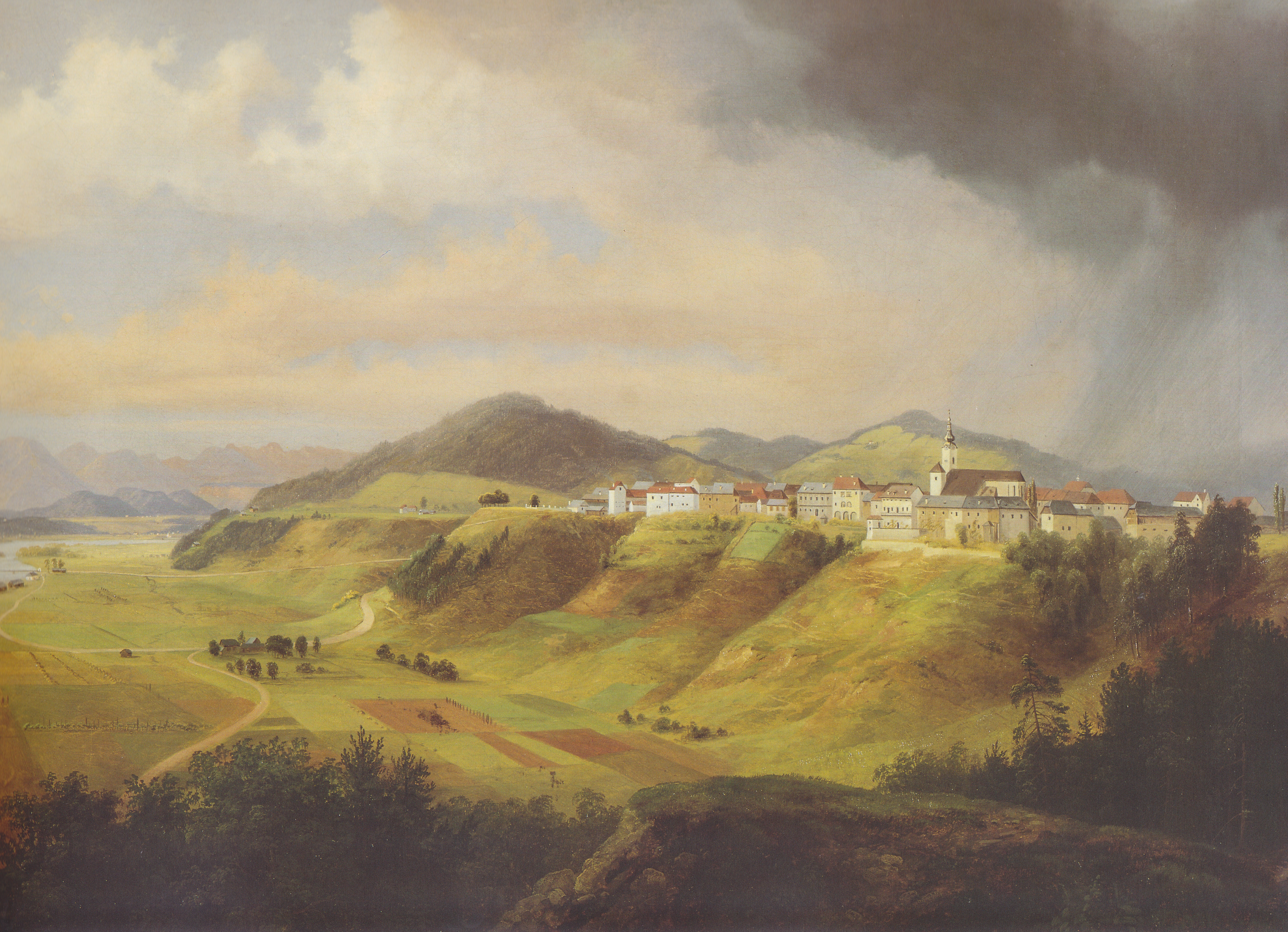
Völkermarkt, painting by Markus Pernhart (1824–1871)

The descendants of Count Siegfried I of Sponheim, who about 1035 had come to the Duchy of Carinthia as a follower of Emperor Conrad II, had a trading post erected at the site about 1090, where a church was built soon afterwards at the behest of the archbishop of Salzburg. In 1217 Duke Bernhard von Spanheim gave orders to build a bridge across the Drava River and had the settlement rebuilt in 1231. Völkermarkt was granted town privileges in the 13th century already and developed quickly as an important centre for trade in iron from the surrounding ore mines.

In the Carinthian Plebiscite of 1920, a majority of the population voted for adhesion to the Republic of Austria. On 18 September 1979, the Yugoslav Department of State Security firebombed the Völkermarkt town hall, severely injuring three men, including two of the agents, and causing heavy damages.

== Population ==
According to the 2001 census 2.6% of the population were Carinthian Slovenes.

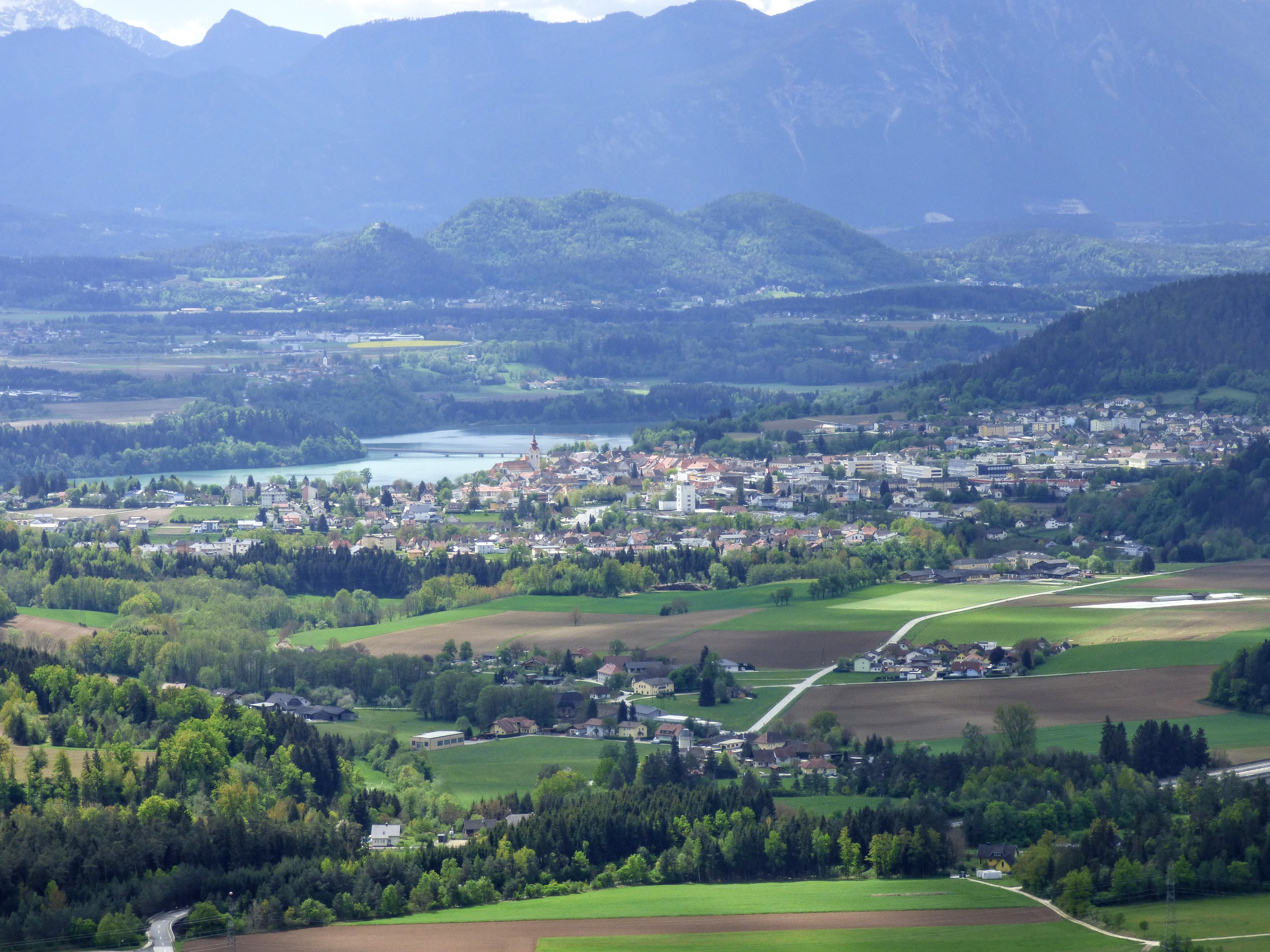
Völkermarkt

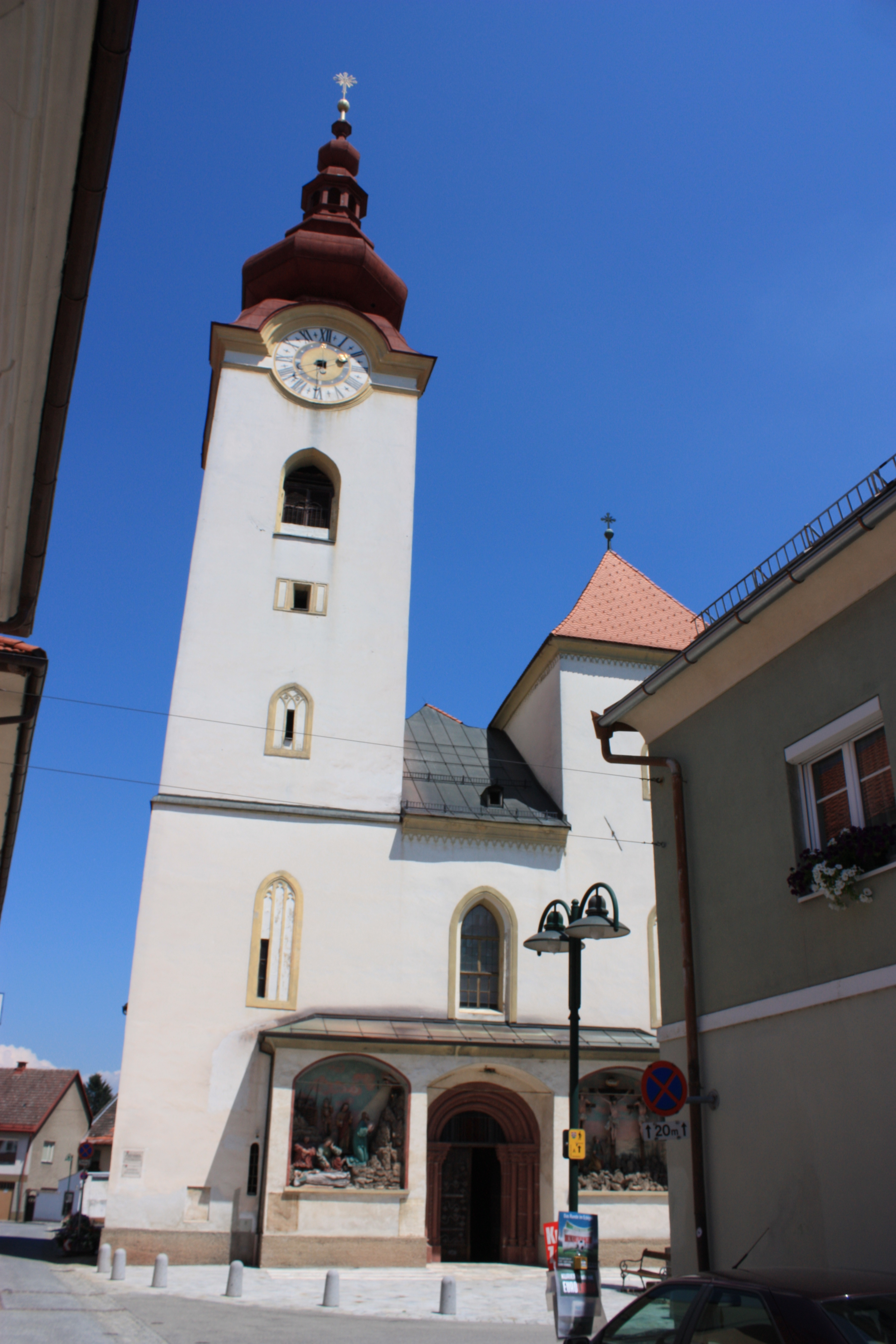
Mary Magdalene parish church

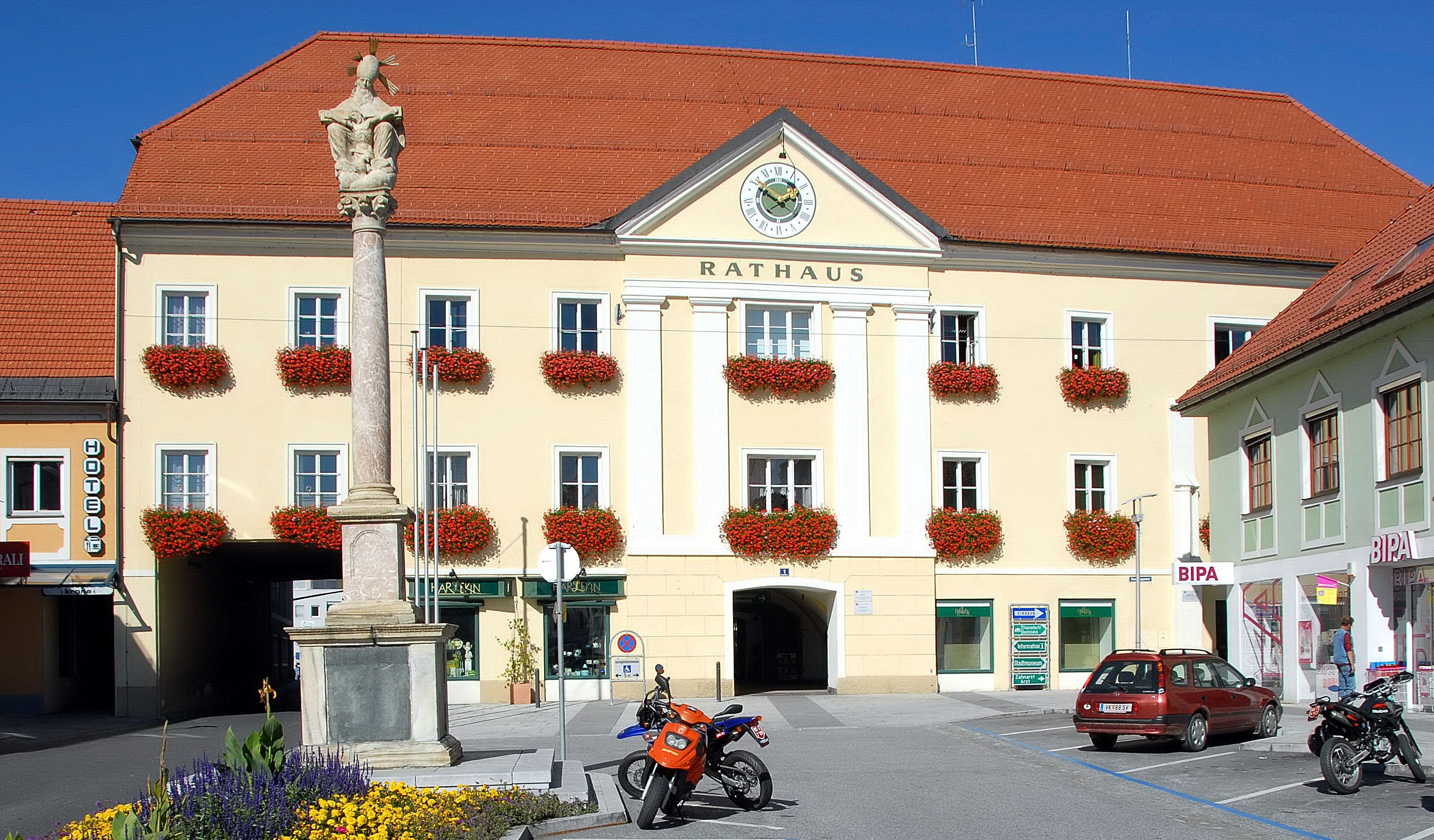
Town hall

Village	Number of people 1991	Percent of Slovenes 1991	Percent of Slovenes 1951
Arlsdorf/Orlača vas	53	7.5%	/
Bach/Potok	62	12.9%	75.4%
Gattersdorf/Štriholče	202	12.4%	31.6%
Krenobitsch/Hrenovče	74	9.5%	31.6%
Penk/Klopče	31	19.4%	57.7%
Rammersdorf/Ramovča vas	60	10.0%	49.3%
St.Peter a.W./Šentpeter n.V	297	10.1%	49.4%
Wandelitzen/Vodenica	54	7.4%	22.4%
Attendorf/Vata vas	34	2.9%	16.4%
Berg ob Attendorf/Rute n.V.	48	0%	27.5%
Ladratschen/Tračje	26	7.7%	2.2%
Obersielach/Gornje Sele	136	1.5%	11.1%
RatschitschachRačiče	90	4.4%	77.4%
Reifnitz/Ribnica	93	3.2%	71.2%
Unterlinden/Podlipa	32	9.4%	10.9%
Wernzach/Brnce	34	0%	97.6%
Gurtschitschach/Gurčiče	47	0%	91.6%
Bösenort/Hudi Kraj	17	0%	38.5%
Rakollach/Rakole	18	0%	29.5%

== Transport ==
The town has access to the Austrian Süd Autobahn (A2) with two junctions. The projected Koralm Railway is expected to improve the area's transport facilities.

== Notable people ==
- Markus Hansiz (1683-1766), Jesuit and historian.
- Johann Joseph Peyritsch (1835-1889), physicician and botanist
- Julius Ringel (1889-1967), general of the Gebirgstruppe (Mountain troops) of the Wehrmacht

=== Sport ===
- Stephanie Graf (born 1973), athlete; silver medallist in the 800m at the 2000 Summer Olympics
- Elmar Lichtenegger (born 1974), hurdler, now subject to a lifetime ban
- Magdalena Lobnig (born 1990), rower, bronze medallist at the 2020 Summer Olympics

== International relations ==
=== Twin towns – Sister cities ===
Völkermarkt is twinned with:

- San Giorgio di Nogaro, Italy
