= Ruden =

Ruden may refer to:

- Ruden, Austria, town in Austria
- Ruden (island), island in Germany
- Haus zum Rüden, the guildhall of the Gesellschaft zur Constaffel in Zürich, Switzerland
