= St. Kanzian am Klopeiner See =

St. Kanzian am Klopeiner See Škocjan v Podjuni
- Municipality
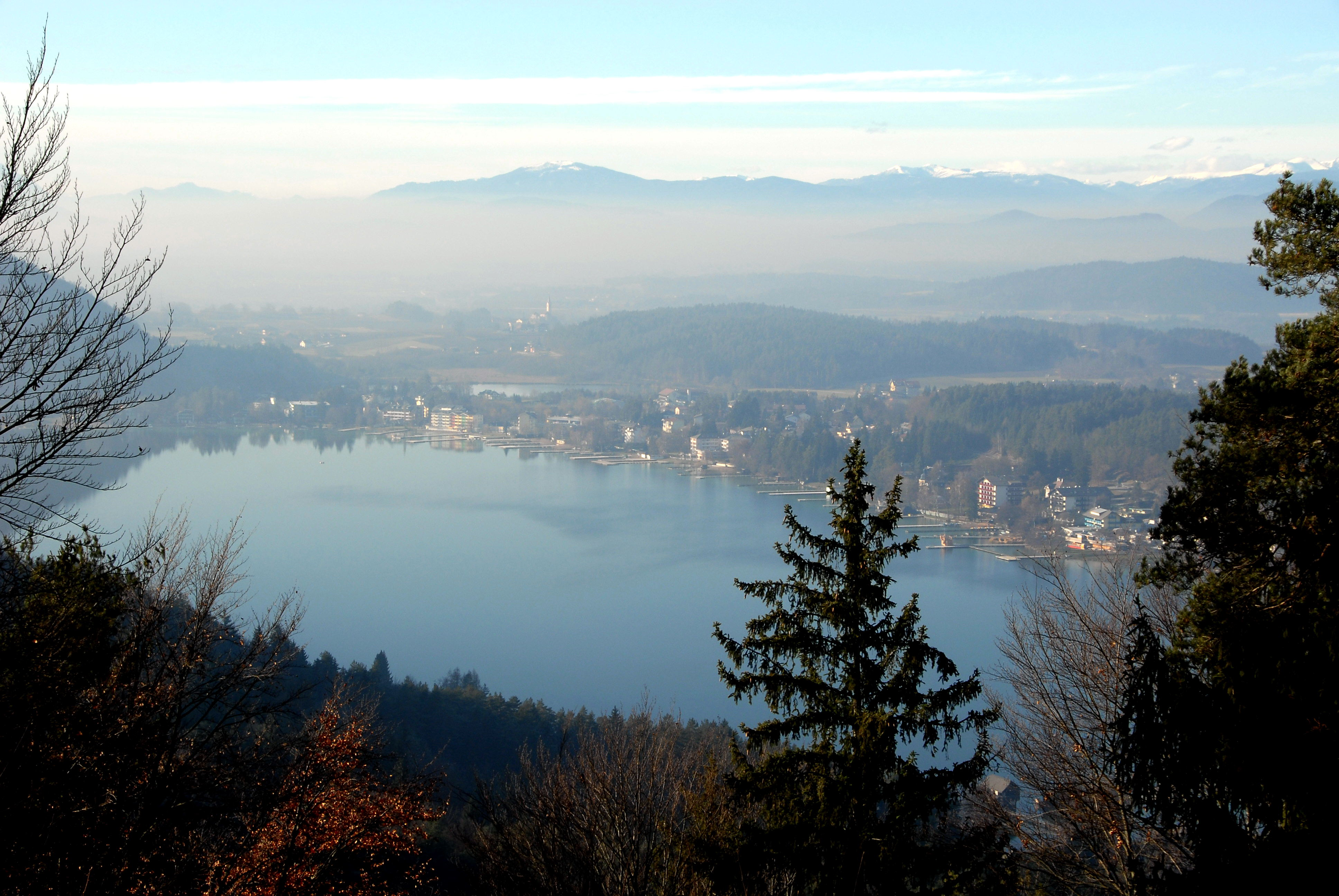
- Sankt Kanzian from the Georgiberg

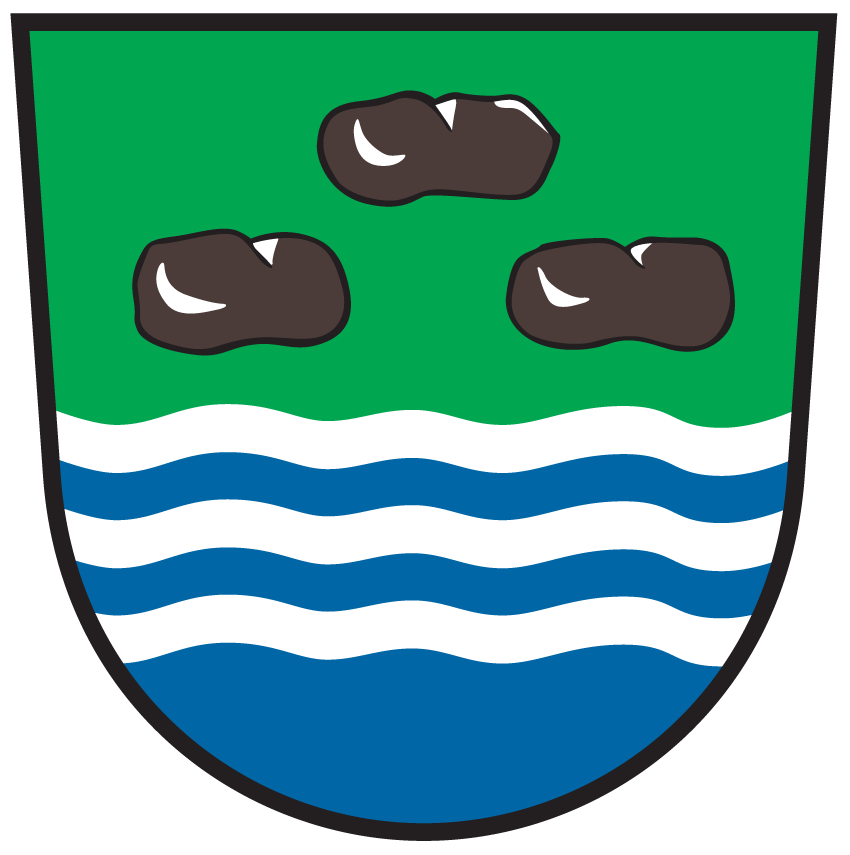
- Coat of arms

- Location within Austria
- Coordinates: 46°36′N 14°34′E
- Country: Austria
- State: Carinthia
- District: Völkermarkt

Government
  - Mayor: Thomas Krainz

Area
  - Total: 41.01 km^{2} (15.83 sq mi)
- Elevation: 442 m (1,450 ft)

Population (2018-01-01)
  - Total: 4,403
  - Density: 107.4/km^{2} (278.1/sq mi)
- Time zone: UTC+1 (CET)
  - Summer (DST): UTC+2 (CEST)
- Postal code: 9122
- Area code: 04239
- Website: www.st.kanzian.at

St. Kanzian am Klopeiner See (Slovene: Škocjan v Podjuni) is a municipality in the district of Völkermarkt in the Austrian state of Carinthia.

== Geography ==
St. Kanzian lies in the Jaun Valley south of the Völkermarkt Reservoir about 7 km from Völkermarkt.
