= Diex =

Diex Djekše
- Municipality
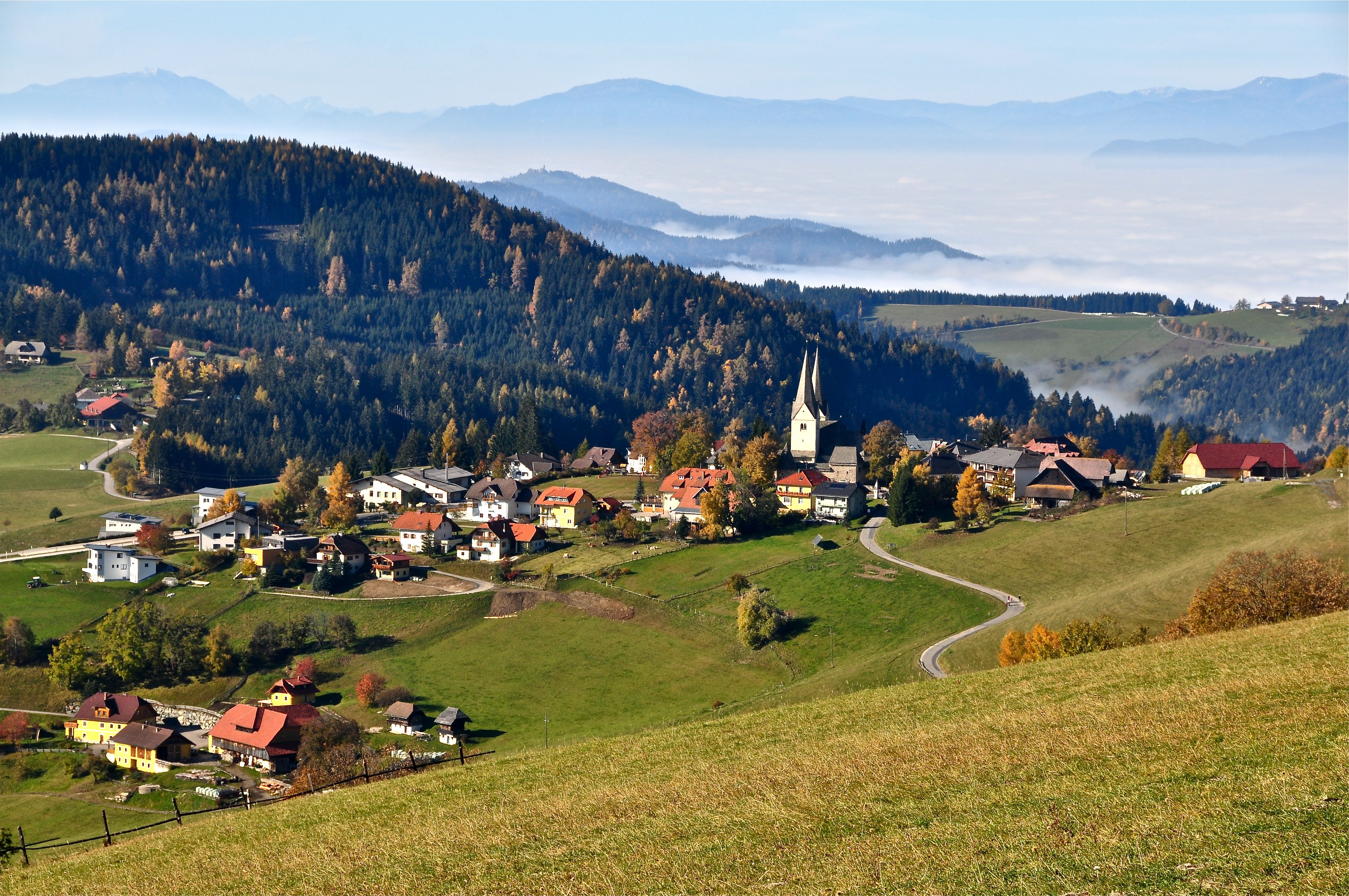

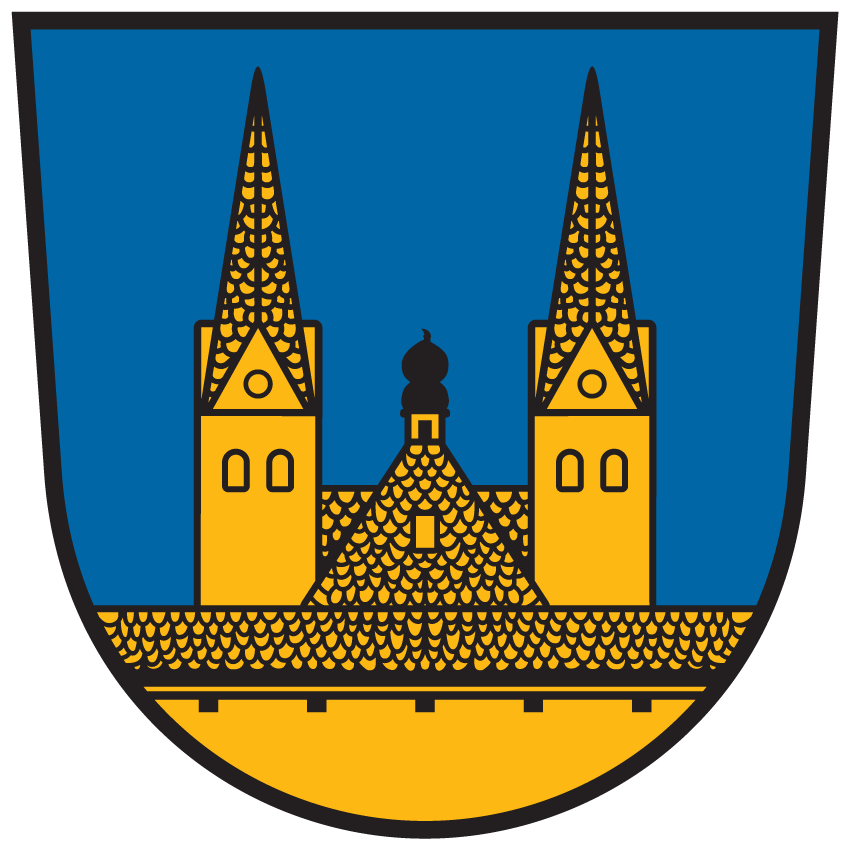
- Coat of arms
- Interactive map of Diex
- Location within Austria
- Coordinates: 46°45′N 14°37′E
- Country: Austria
- State: Carinthia
- District: Völkermarkt

Government
  - Mayor: Anton Polessnig

Area
  - Total: 54.95 km^{2} (21.22 sq mi)
- Elevation: 1,159 m (3,802 ft)

Population (2018-01-01)
  - Total: 825
  - Density: 15.0/km^{2} (38.9/sq mi)
- Time zone: UTC+1 (CET)
  - Summer (DST): UTC+2 (CEST)
- Postal code: 9103
- Area code: 04231
- Website: www.sonnenort-diex.at

Diex (German pronunciation: [diə̯ks]; Slovene: Djekše) is a town in the district of Völkermarkt in Austrian state of Carinthia. It is known for its Gothic fortified church on a hilltop.

== Geography ==
Diex lies in southeast Carinthia on the southern slope of the Saualpe high above the Jaun Valley and the Lavant valley.

== Population ==
Village	Number of people 1991	Percent of Slovenes 1991	Percent of Slovenes 1951
Haimburgerberg / Vovbrška Gora	177	24.9%	86.9%
Bösenort / Hudi Kraj	91	14.3%	30.4%
Grossenegg / Tolsti Vrh	53	17%	96.3%
Grafenbach / Kneža	130	10.8%	12.3%
