= Völkermarkt District =

District in Austria

Coordinates: 46.591°N 14.644°E

Völkermarkt District Bezirk Völkermarkt
- District
- Country: Austria
- State: Carinthia
- Number of municipalities: 13
- Administrative seat: Völkermarkt

Area
  - Total: 907.5 km^{2} (350.4 sq mi)

Population (2001)
  - Total: 43,575
  - Density: 48.02/km^{2} (124.4/sq mi)
- Time zone: UTC+01:00 (CET)
  - Summer (DST): UTC+02:00 (CEST)
- Vehicle registration: VK

The Völkermarkt District (German: Bezirk Völkermarkt, Slovene: Okrože Velikovec) is an administrative district in the Austrian state of Carinthia.

== Municipalities ==
Völkermarkt is divided into 13 municipalities, of which 2 are towns and 3 market towns.

=== Towns ===
- Bleiburg (Slovene: Pliberk) (4,083)
  - Aich, Bleiburg, Dobrowa, Draurain, Ebersdorf, Einersdorf, Grablach, Kömmel, Kömmelgupf, Loibach, Lokowitzen, Moos, Replach, Rinkenberg, Rinkolach, Ruttach, Schattenberg, Schilterndorf, St. Georgen, St. Margarethen, Weißenstein, Wiederndorf, Woroujach
- Völkermarkt (Slovene: Velikovec) (11,373)
  - Admont, Aich, Arlsdorf, Attendorf, Bach, Berg ob Attendorf, Berg ob St. Martin, Bergstein, Bischofberg, Bösenort, Dobrowa, Drauhofen, Dullach I, Dullach II, Dürrenmoos, Frankenberg, Führholz, Gänsdorf, Gattersdorf, Gletschach, Greuth, Gurtschitschach, Hafendorf, Haimburg, Höhenbergen, Hungerrain, Kaltenbrunn, Klein St. Veit, Korb, Kremschitz, Krenobitsch, Kulm, Ladratschen, Lassein, Lasseinerbucht, Lippendorf, Mittertrixen, Neudenstein, Niederdorf, Niedertrixen, Niedertrixen, Obersielach, Obertrixen, Oschenitzen, Penk, Pörtschach, Rakollach, Rammersdorf, Rammersdorf, Ratschitschach, Reifnitz, Reisdorf, Ruhstatt, Ruppgegend, Salchendorf, Skoflitzen, St. Agnes, St. Georgen am Weinberg, St. Jakob, St. Lorenzen, St. Margarethen ob Töllerberg, St. Martin, St. Michael ob der Gurk, St. Peter am Wallersberg, St. Stefan, Steinkogel, Tainach, Tainacherfeld, Terpetzen, Töllerberg, Unarach, Unterbergen, Unterlinden, Völkermarkt, Waisenberg, Wandelitzen, Watzelsdorf, Weinberg, Wernzach, Winklern, Wurzen

=== Market towns ===
- Eberndorf (Slovene: Dobrla vas) (6,016)
  - Buchbrunn, Buchhalm, Duell, Eberndorf, Edling, Gablern, Gösselsdorf, Graben, Hart, Hof, Homitzberg, Humtschach, Köcking, Kohldorf, Kühnsdorf, Loibegg, Mittlern, Mökriach, Oberburg, Pribelsdorf, Pudab, Seebach, St. Marxen, Unterbergen, Wasserhofen
- Eisenkappel-Vellach (Slovene: Železna Kapla-Bela) (2,710)
  - Bad Eisenkappel, Blasnitzen, Ebriach, Koprein Petzen, Koprein Sonnseite, Leppen, Lobnig, Rechberg, Remschenig, Trögern, Unterort, Vellach, Weißenbach, Zauchen
- Griffen (Slovene: Grebinj) (3,677)
  - Altenmarkt, Enzelsdorf, Erlach, Gariusch, Gletschach, Griffen, Griffnergemeinde, Großenegg, Grutschen, Haberberg, Haberberg, Kaunz, Kleindörfl, Klosterberg, Langegg, Lichtenwald, Limberg, Lind, Obere Gemeinde, Poppendorf, Pustritz, Rakounig, Rausch, Salzenberg, Schloßberg, St. Jakob, St. Kollmann, St. Leonhard an der Saualpe, Stift Griffen, Tschrietes, Untergrafenbach, Untergreutschach, Unterrain, Wallersberg, Wölfnitz, Wriesen

=== Municipalities ===
- Diex (Slovene: Djekše) (863)
  - Bösenort (Slovene: Hudi kraj), Diex, Grafenbach (Slovene: Kneža), Großenegg (Slovene: Tolsti Vrh), Haimburgerberg (Slovene: Vovbrske Gore), Michaelerberg (Slovene: Šmihelska Gora), Obergreutschach (Slovene: Zgornje Krčanje)
- Feistritz ob Bleiburg (Slovene: Bistrica pri Pliberku) (2,128)
  - Dolintschitschach, Feistritz ob Bleiburg, Gonowetz, Gonowetz, Hinterlibitsch, Hof, Lettenstätten, Penk, Pirkdorf, Rischberg, Ruttach-Schmelz, St. Michael ob Bleiburg, Tscherberg, Unterlibitsch, Unterort, Winkel
- Gallizien (Slovene: Galicija) (1,825)
  - Abriach, Abtei, Dolintschach, Drabunaschach, Enzelsdorf, Feld, Freibach, Gallizien, Glantschach, Goritschach, Krejanzach, Linsendorf, Möchling, Moos, Pirk, Pölzling, Robesch, Unterkrain, Vellach, Wildenstein
- Globasnitz (Slovene: Globasnica) (1,645)
  - Globasnitz, Jaunstein, Kleindorf, Podrain, Slovenjach, St. Stefan, Traundorf, Tschepitschach, Unterbergen, Wackendorf
- Neuhaus (Slovene: Suha) (1,236)
  - Bach-Potoce, Berg ob Leifling, Graditschach, Hart, Heiligenstadt, Illmitzen, Kogelnigberg, Leifling, Motschula, Neuhaus, Oberdorf, Pudlach, Schwabegg, Unterdorf, Wesnitzen, Wesnitzen
- Ruden (Slovene: Ruda) (1,600)
  - Dobrowa, Eis, Grutschen, Kanaren, Kleindiex, Kraßnitz, Lippitzbach, Obermitterdorf, Ruden, St. Jakob, St. Martin, St. Nikolai, St. Radegund, Untermitterdorf, Unternberg, Unterrain, Weißeneggerberg, Wunderstätten
- Sankt Kanzian am Klopeiner See (Slovene: Škocijan) (4,297)
  - Brenndorf, Duell, Grabelsdorf, Horzach I, Horzach II, Kleindorf I, Kleindorf II, Klopein, Lanzendorf, Lauchenholz, Littermoos, Mökriach, Nageltschach, Oberburg, Obersammelsdorf, Oberseidendorf, Peratschitzen, Piskertschach, Saager, Schreckendorf, Seelach, Seidendorf, Sertschach, Srejach, St. Kanzian am Klopeiner See, St. Lorenzen, St. Marxen, St. Primus, St. Veit im Jauntal, Stein im Jauntal, Steinerberg, Unterburg, Unternarrach, Untersammelsdorf, Vesielach, Wasserhofen, Weitendorf
- Sittersdorf (Slovene: Žitara vas) (2,122)
  - Altendorf, Blasnitzenberg, Dullach, Goritschach, Hart, Homelitschach, Jerischach, Kleinzapfen, Kristendorf, Miklauzhof, Müllnern, Obernarrach, Pfannsdorf, Pogerschitzen, Polena, Proboj, Rain, Rückersdorf, Sagerberg, Sielach, Sittersdorf, Sonnegg, Tichoja, Weinberg, Wigasnitz, Winkel, Wrießnitz

(All population data comes from the 2001 census)
