= Gallizien =

- Municipality
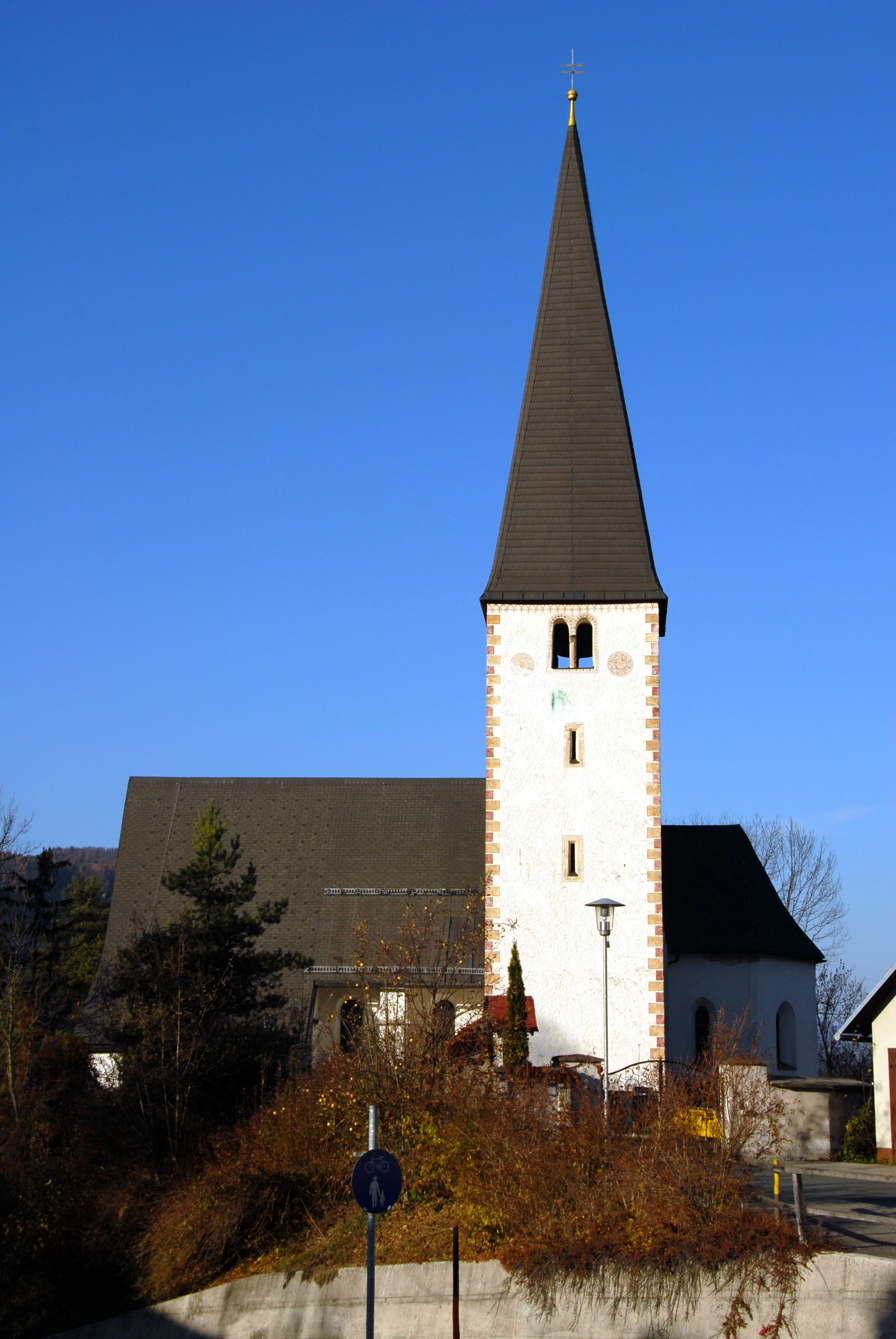

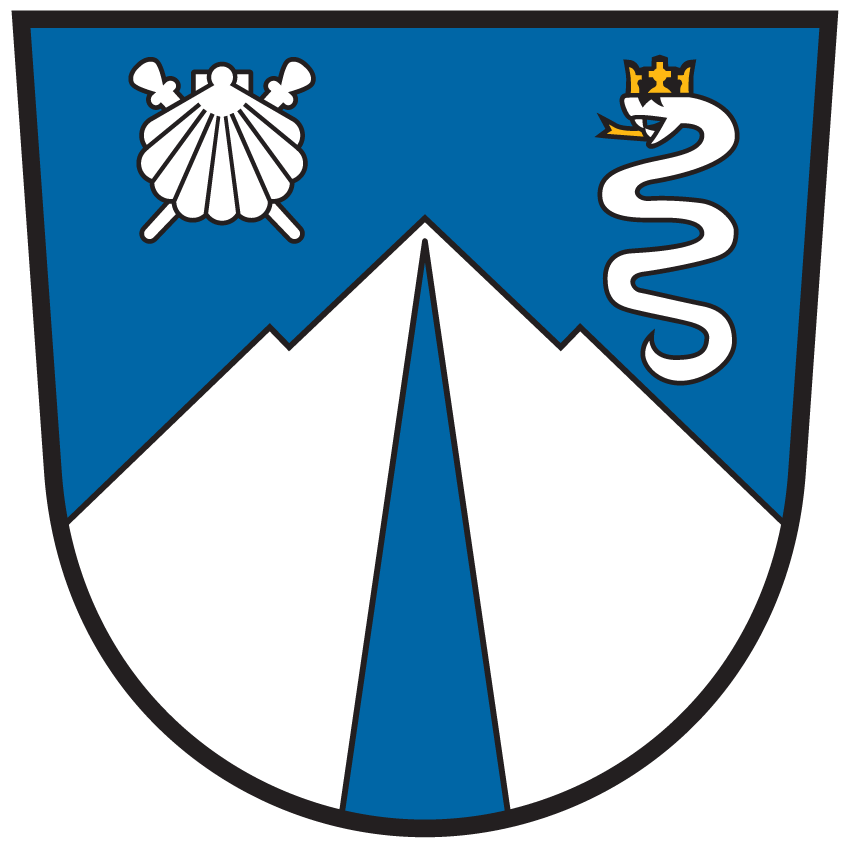
- Coat of arms

- Location within Austria
- Coordinates: 46°33′N 14°30′E
- Country: Austria
- State: Carinthia
- District: Völkermarkt

Government
  - Mayor: Rudolf Tomaschitz

Area
  - Total: 46.81 km^{2} (18.07 sq mi)
- Elevation: 436 m (1,430 ft)

Population (2018-01-01)
  - Total: 1,761
  - Density: 37.62/km^{2} (97.44/sq mi)
- Time zone: UTC+1 (CET)
  - Summer (DST): UTC+2 (CEST)
- Postal code: 9132
- Area code: 04221
- Website: www.gallizien.at www.abriach.at

Gallizien (German: [ɡaˈliːtsi̯ən]; Slovene: Galicija) is a town in the district of Völkermarkt in the Austrian state of Carinthia.

== Etymology ==
The Augustinian Canons of Eberndorf Abbey built a proprietary church dedicated to James the Great. Originally, the church was referred to as unter Wildenstein or an der Vellach. From the 15th century onward, the settlement in which the church was located became known as Gallizien, named after the Spanish pilgrimage destination Santiago de Compostela in Galicia, which is also dedicated to the same saint. Before that, the settlement was called Gestidorf.

== Geography ==
Gallizien lies in southern Carinthia on the boundary between the Rosen and Jaun valleys. The Vellach flows through it.
