= Globasnitz =

Globasnitz Globasnica
- Municipality
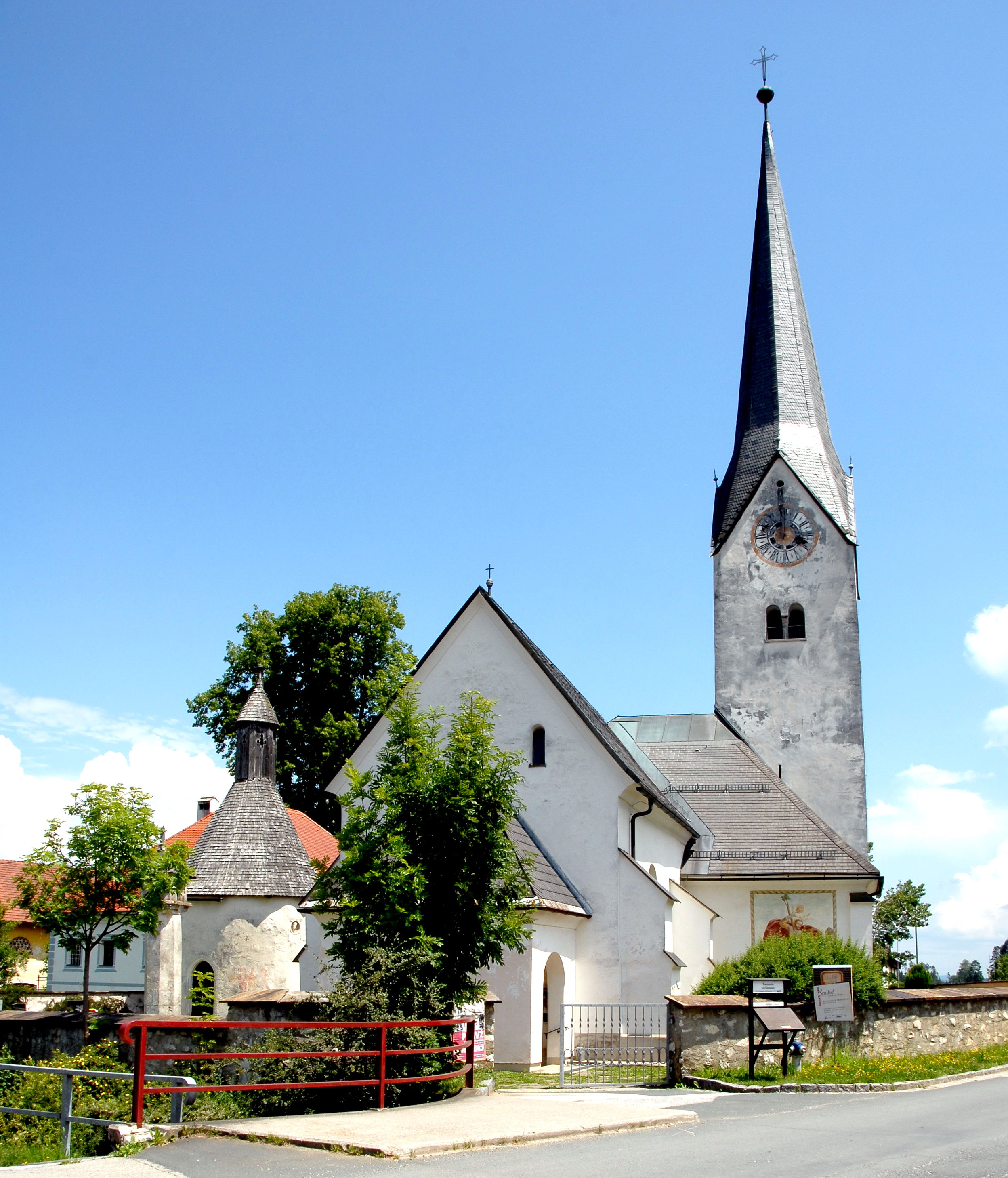
- Church of the Assumption of the Virgin Mary

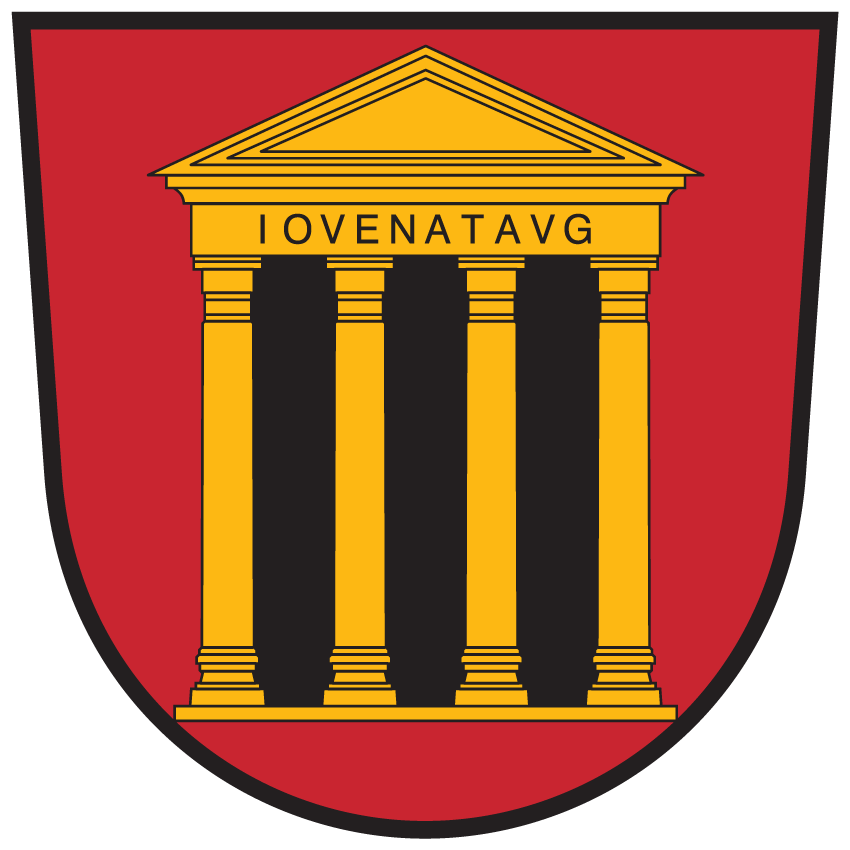
- Coat of arms

- Location within Austria Globasnitz (Austria)
- Coordinates: 46°33′N 14°42′E
- Country: Austria
- State: Carinthia
- District: Völkermarkt

Government
  - Mayor: Bernhard Sadovnik (EL)

Area
  - Total: 38.39 km^{2} (14.82 sq mi)
- Elevation: 541 m (1,775 ft)

Population (2018-01-01)
  - Total: 1,620
  - Density: 42.2/km^{2} (109/sq mi)
- Time zone: UTC+1 (CET)
  - Summer (DST): UTC+2 (CEST)
- Postal code: 9142
- Area code: 04230
- Website: www.globasnitz.at

Globasnitz (Slovene: Globasnica) is a town in the district of Völkermarkt in the Austrian state of Carinthia.

== Population ==
A considerable percentage (42.1%) of the population are Carinthian Slovenes, and Slovene is a second official language of the municipality.

== History ==
In the Carinthian Plebiscite of 1920, Sankt Jakob was one of the 17 Carinthian municipalities, where the majority of the population (52%) voted for the annexation to the Kingdom of Serbs, Croats and Slovenes (Yugoslavia).
