= Feistritz ob Bleiburg =

Feistritz ob Bleiburg Bistrica pri Pliberku
- Municipality
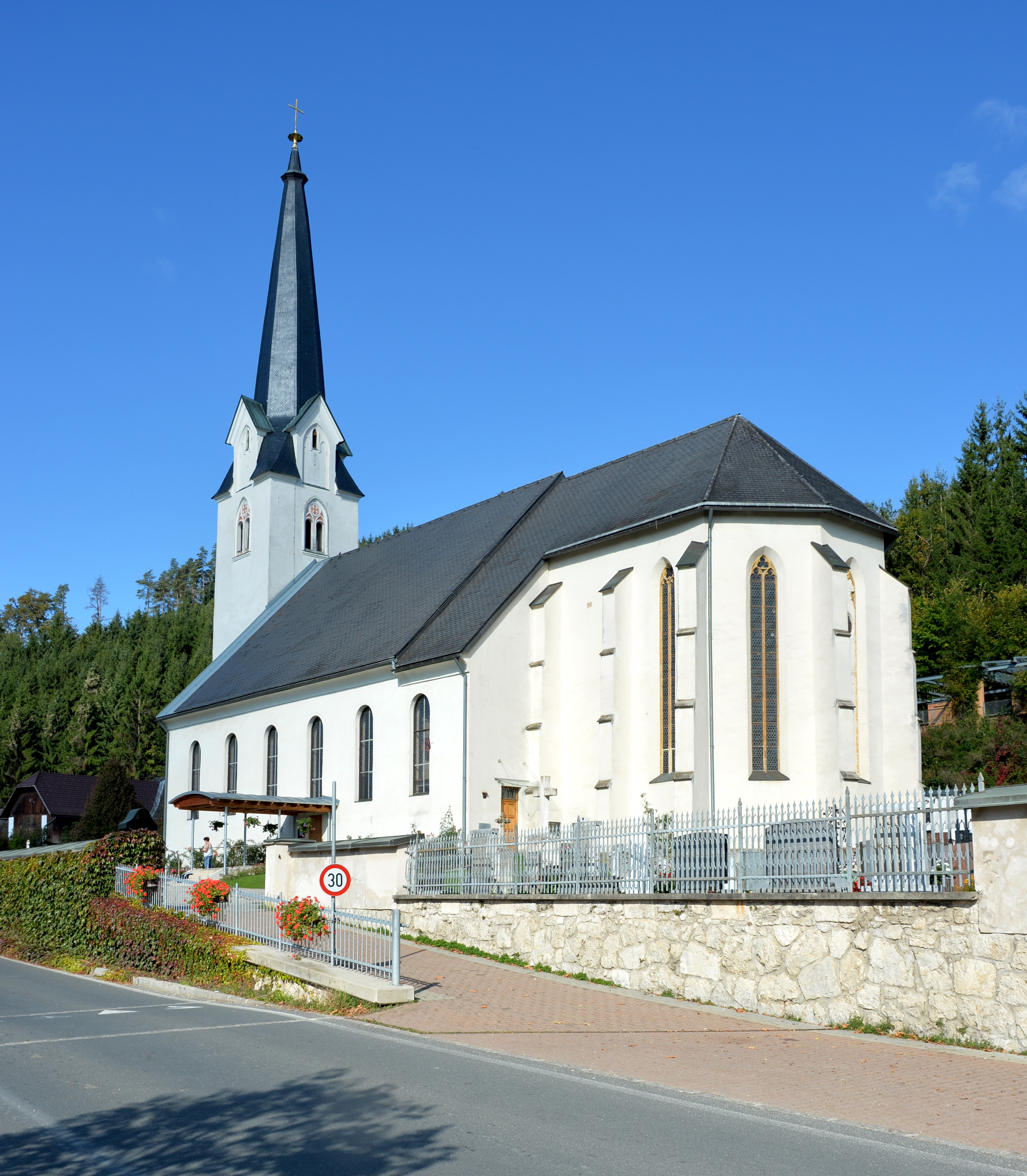
- Feistritz ob Bleiburg parish church

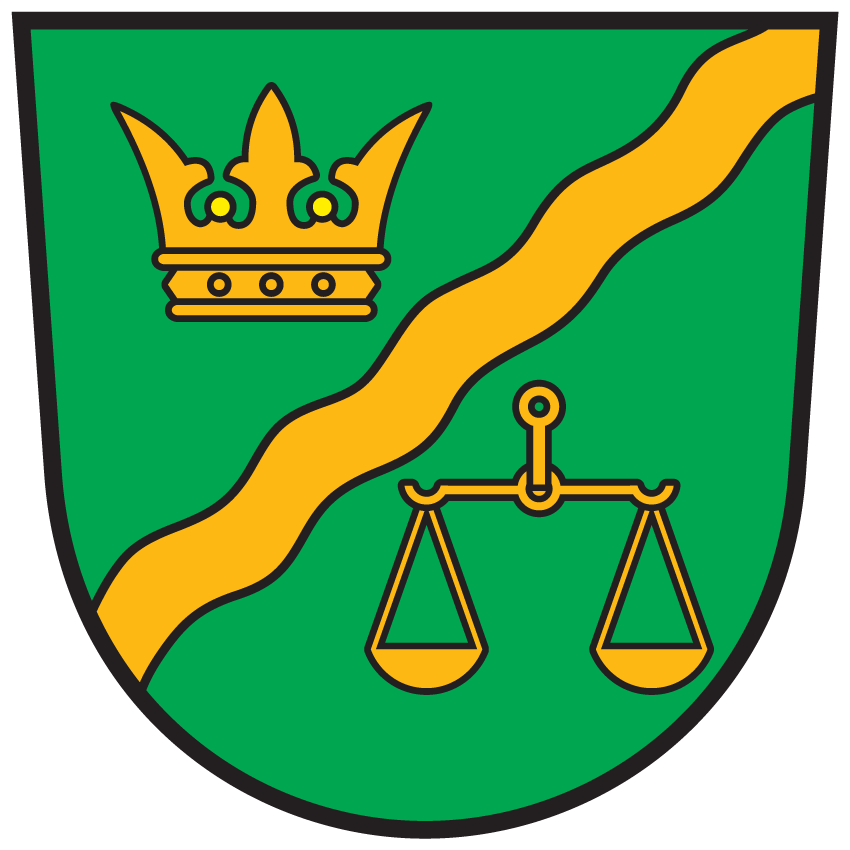
- Coat of arms

- Location within Austria Location with Carinthia
- Coordinates: 46°33′N 14°45′E
- Country: Austria
- State: Carinthia
- District: Völkermarkt

Government
  - Mayor: Fritz Flödl

Area
  - Total: 54.07 km^{2} (20.88 sq mi)
- Elevation: 550 m (1,800 ft)

Population (2018-01-01)
  - Total: 2,185
  - Density: 40.41/km^{2} (104.7/sq mi)
- Time zone: UTC+1 (CET)
  - Summer (DST): UTC+2 (CEST)
- Postal code: 9143
- Area code: 04235
- Website: www.riskommunal.at

Feistritz ob Bleiburg (Slovene: Bistrica pri Pliberku) is a town in the district of Völkermarkt in the Austrian state of Carinthia.

== History ==
In the Carinthian Plebiscite of 1920, Sankt Jakob was one of the 17 Carinthian municipalities, where the majority of the population (65%) voted for the annexation to the Kingdom of Serbs, Croats and Slovenes (Yugoslavia).

== Population ==
According to the 2001 census 33.3% of the population are Carinthian Slovenes.

Village	Number of people 1991	Percent of Slovenes 1991	Percent of Slovenes 1951
Dolintschitschach/Dolinčiče	56	75.0%	100%
Feistritz/Bistrica	318	47.2%	72.4%
Gonowetz/Konovece	306	22.2%	70.9%
Hinterlibitsch/Suha	56	26.8%	100%
Hof/Dvor	199	57.8%	96.6%
Lettenstätten/Letina	101	49.5%	89.0%
Penk/Ponikva	206	17.0%	74.7%
Pirkdorf/Breška vas	92	44.6%	90.7%
Rischberg/Rišperk	1	0%	56.5%
Ruttach-Scmelz/Rute	13	84.6%	68.1%
St.Michael/Šmihel	298	54.0%	69.4%
Tscherberg/Črgoviče	102	82.4%	96.8%
Unterlibitsch/Podlibič	52	26.9%	33.3%
Unterort/Pokraj	136		
