= Ruden, Austria =

Ruden
- Municipality
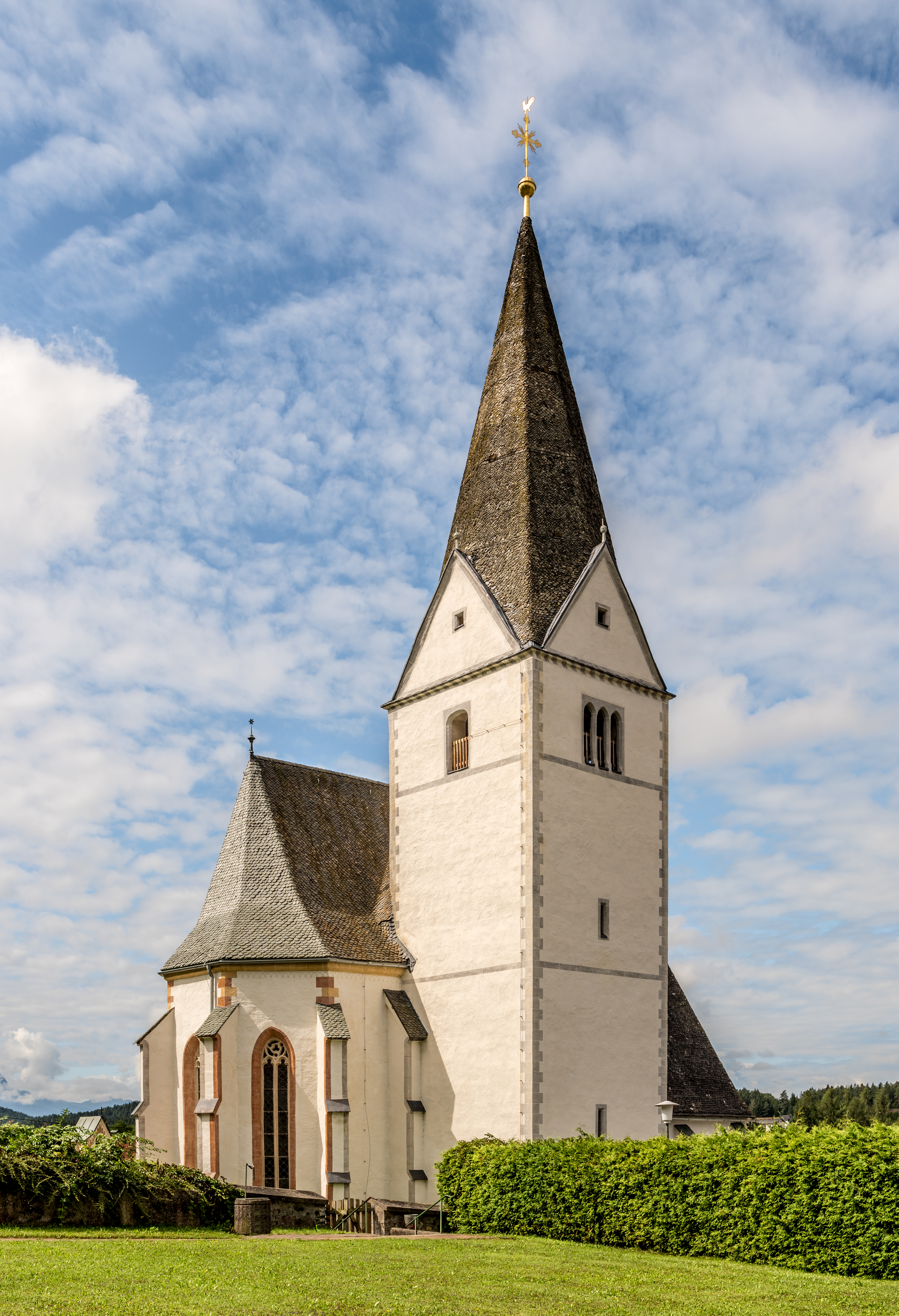
- Church of Saint Mary Magdalene

- Coat of arms

- Location within Austria
- Coordinates: 46°39′N 14°46′E
- Country: Austria
- State: Carinthia
- District: Völkermarkt

Government
  - Mayor: Rudolf Skorjanz (SPÖ)

Area
  - Total: 42.43 km^{2} (16.38 sq mi)
- Elevation: 465 m (1,526 ft)

Population (2018-01-01)
  - Total: 1,530
  - Density: 36.1/km^{2} (93.4/sq mi)
- Time zone: UTC+1 (CET)
  - Summer (DST): UTC+2 (CEST)
- Postal code: 9113
- Area code: 04234
- Website: www.ruden.at

Ruden (Austrian German pronunciation: [ˈruːdn̩]; Slovene: Ruda) is a town in the district of Völkermarkt in the Austrian state of Carinthia.

== Geography ==
Ruden lies in the eastern Jaun Valley north of the Drau between the Wallersberg, the Lisnaberg and the Weißenegger Berg. Ruden is a popular stop for many people due to its natural wonders and people. One of its sights is the Lipitzbacher Bridge. Another place worth a visite is the Museum am Bach which is located near Lippitzbach.

== Gallery ==
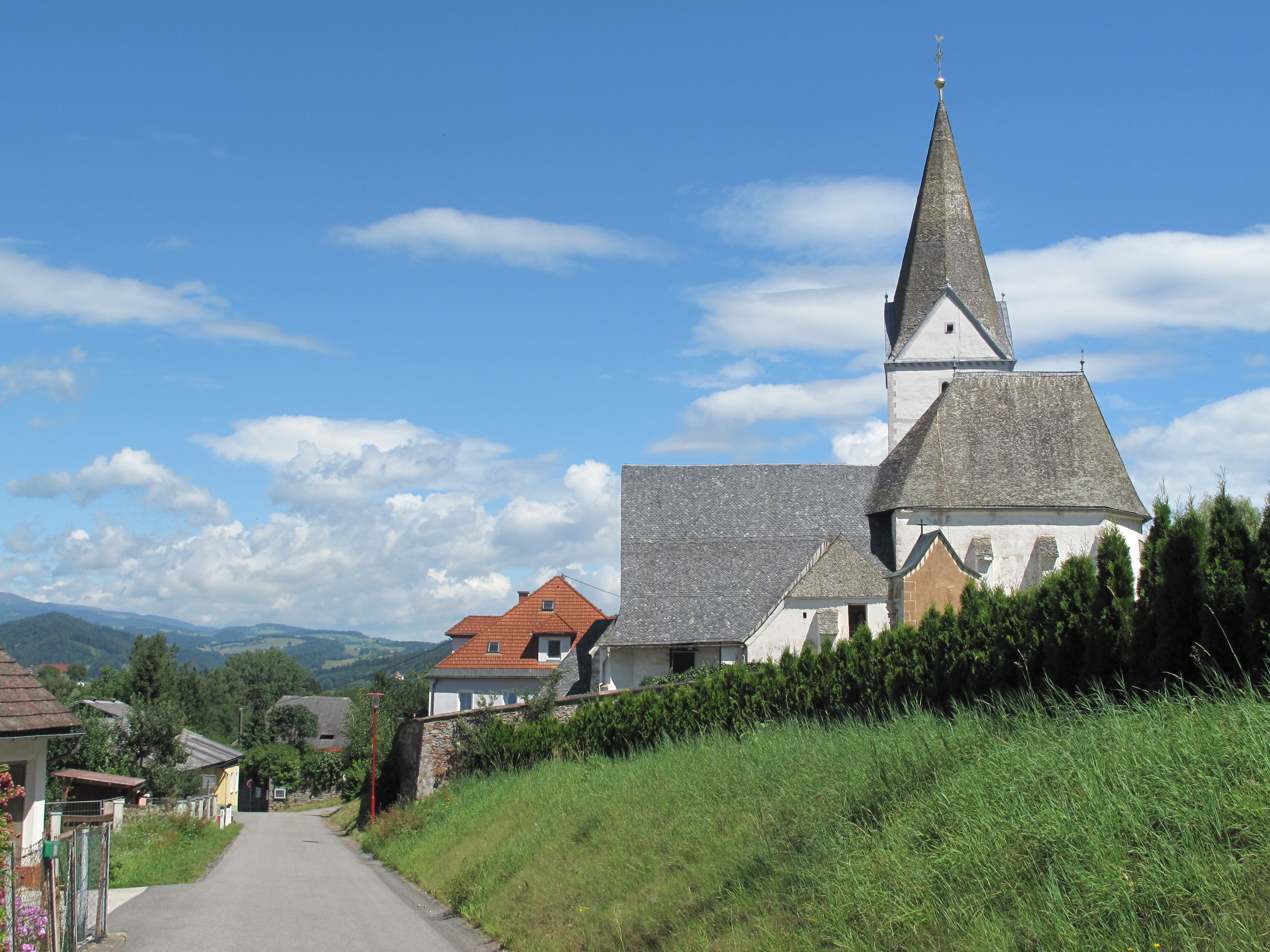
Ruden, church
