= Sittersdorf =

Sittersdorf Žitara vas
- Municipality
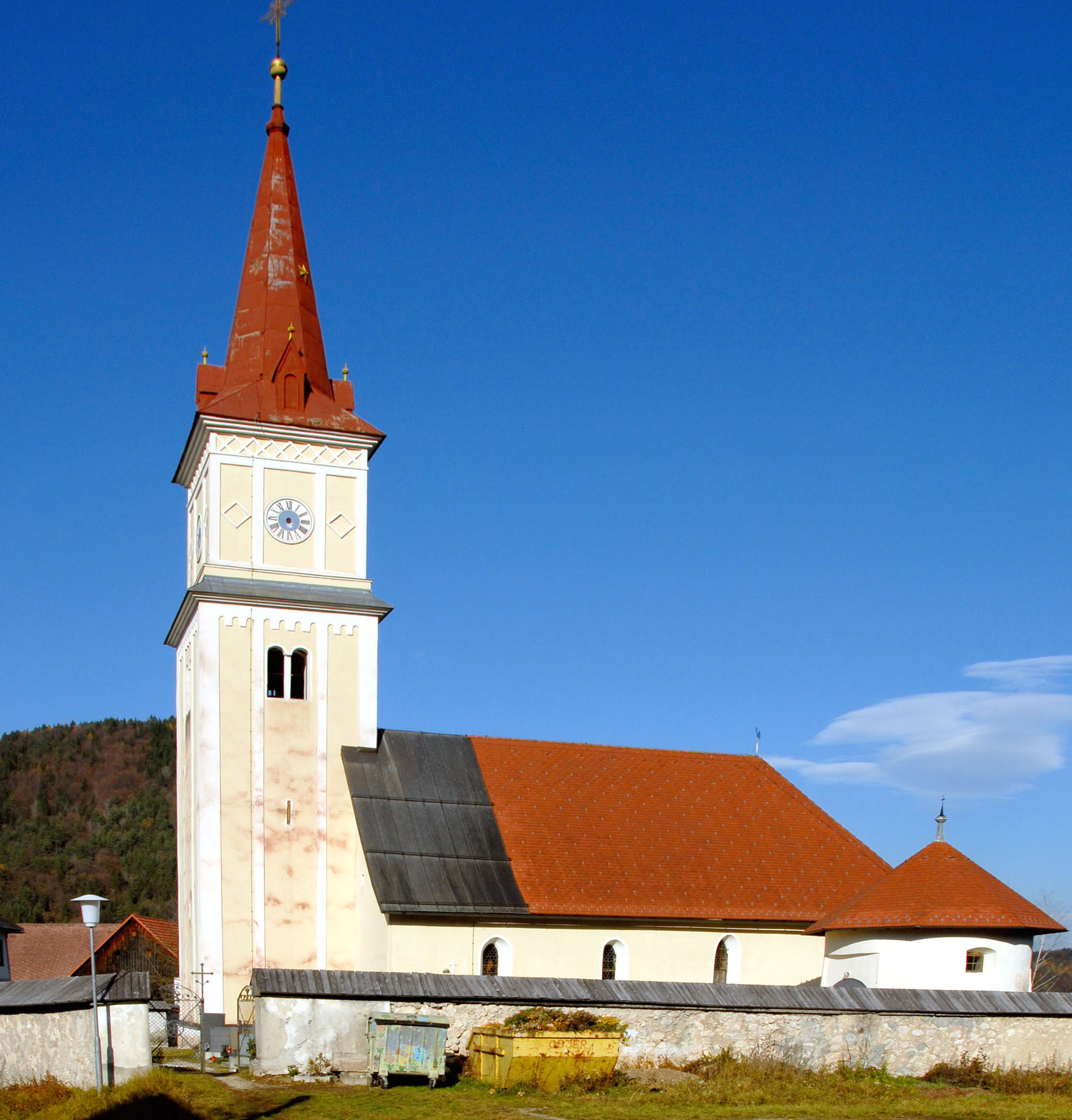

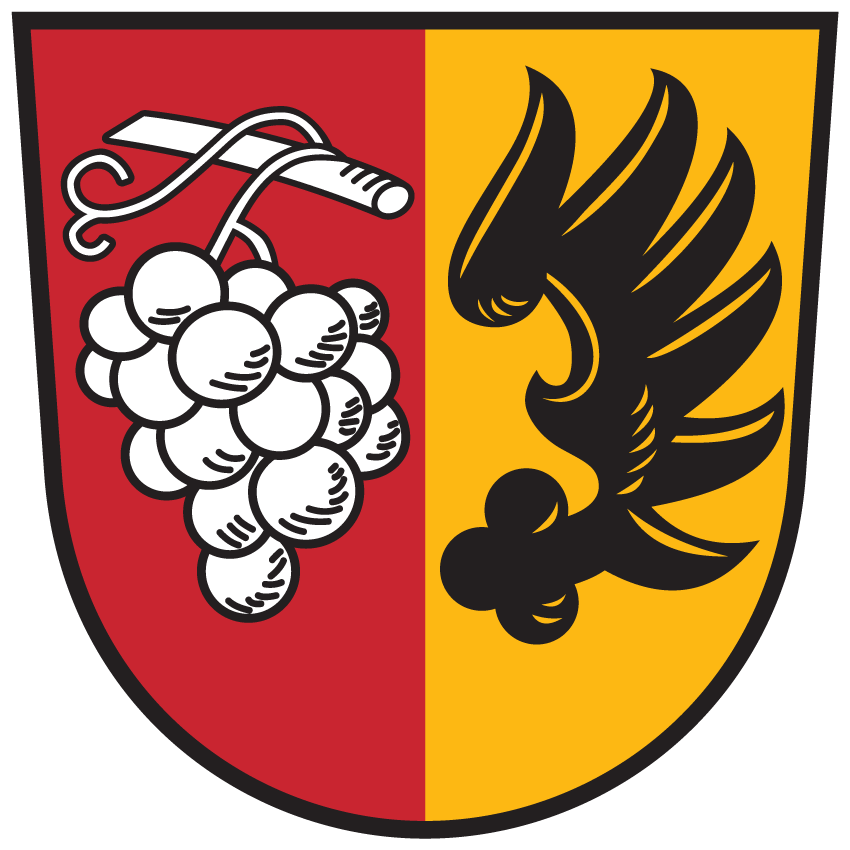
- Coat of arms

- Location within Austria
- Coordinates: 46°32′N 14°36′E
- Country: Austria
- State: Carinthia
- District: Völkermarkt

Government
  - Mayor: Jakob Strauß

Area
  - Total: 44.95 km^{2} (17.36 sq mi)
- Elevation: 500 m (1,600 ft)

Population (2018-01-01)
  - Total: 2,011
  - Density: 44.74/km^{2} (115.9/sq mi)
- Time zone: UTC+1 (CET)
  - Summer (DST): UTC+2 (CEST)
- Postal code: 9133
- Area code: 04237
- Website: www.sittersdorf.at

Sittersdorf (Slovene: Žitara vas) is a town in the district of Völkermarkt in Carinthia in south-central Austria.

== Geography ==
Sittersdorf lies about 10 km as the crow flies from the Slovenian border. The Vellach and the Suchabach flow through it. The largest bodies of water in the municipality are the Gösselsdorfer See and the Sonnegger Reservoir.

== Population ==
According to the 2001 census, 19.8% of the population were Carinthian Slovenes.

== Gallery ==
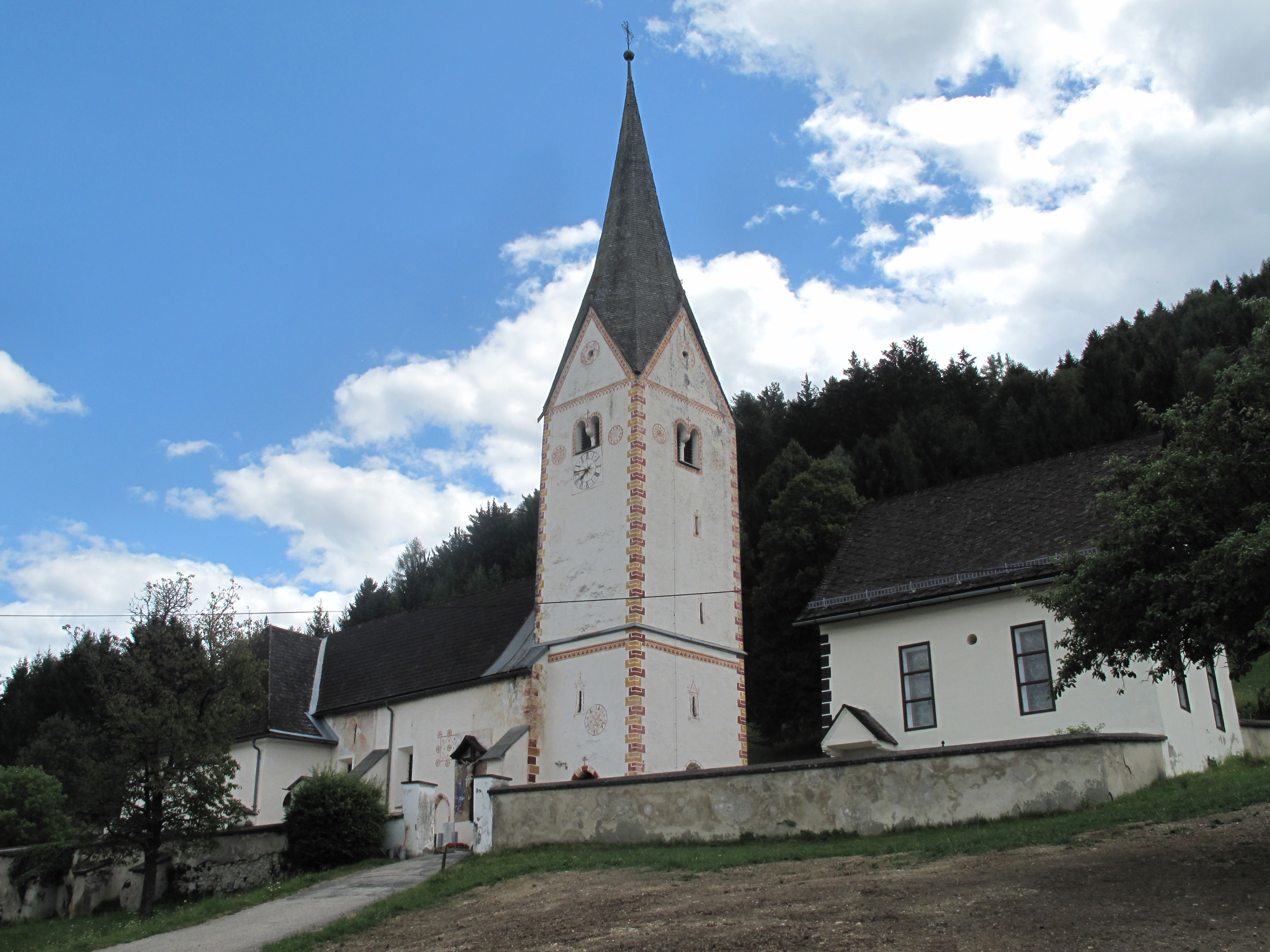
Tichoja, church

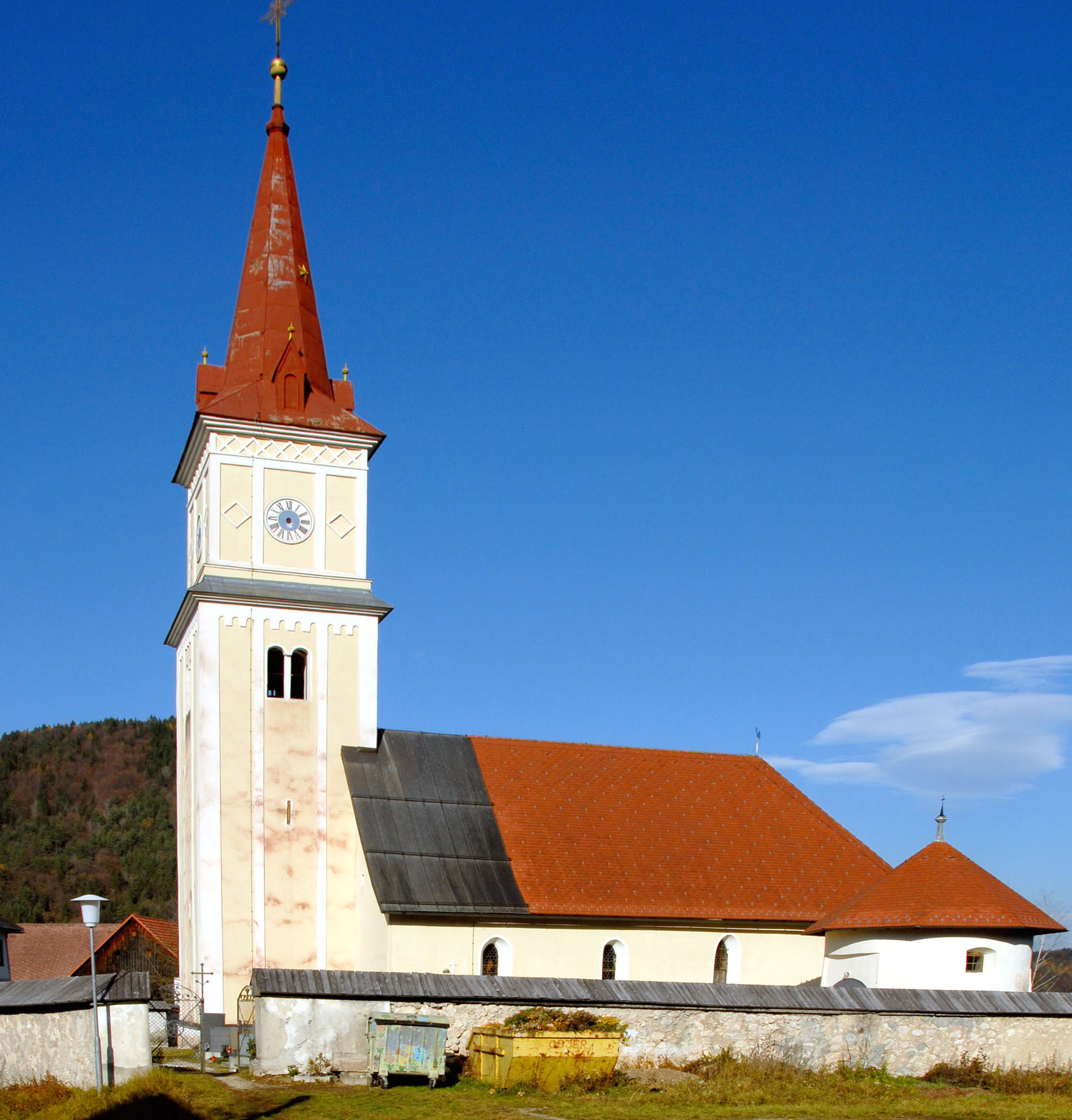
St. Helena, church

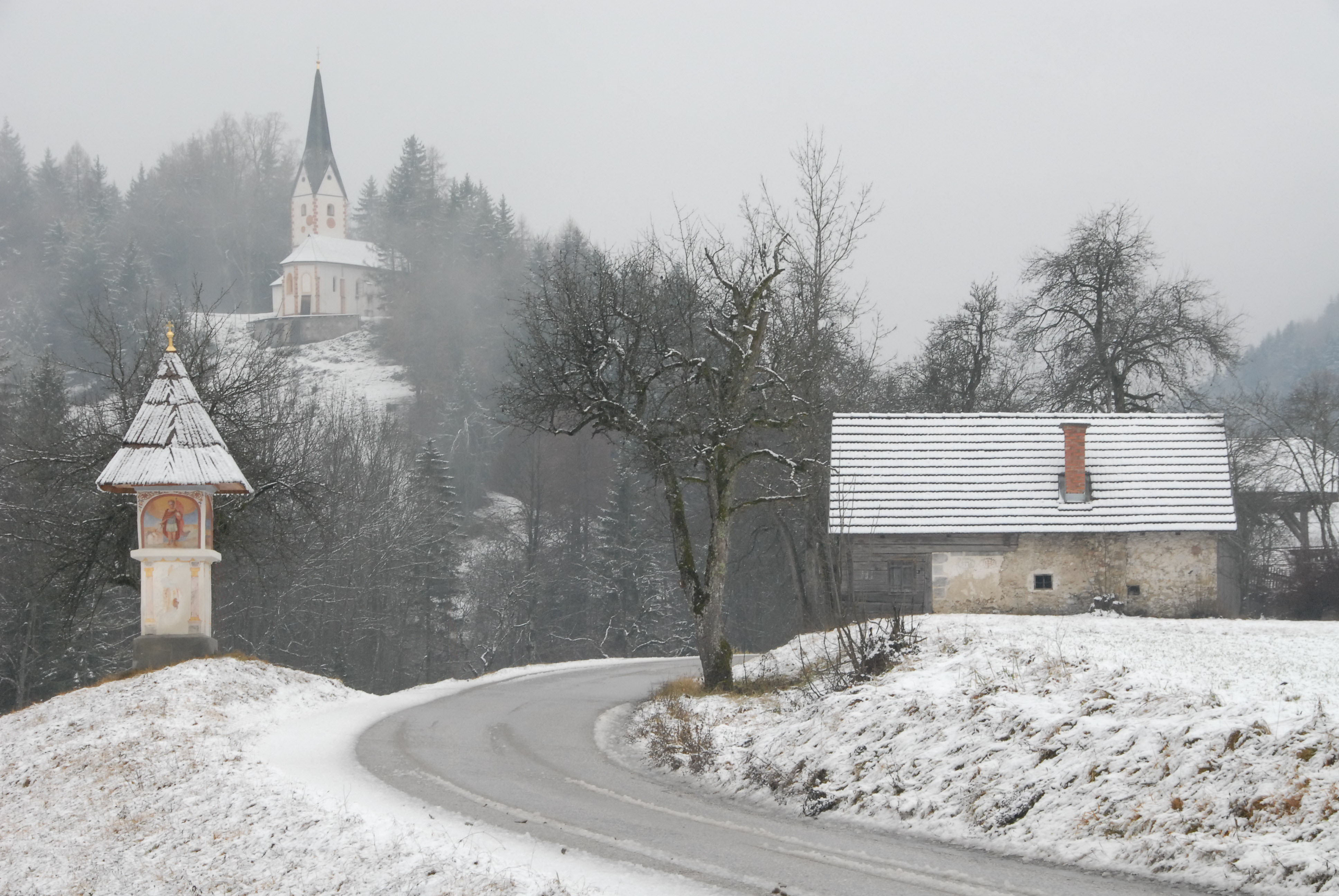
Altendorf, Wayside shrine and succursal church St. Andrew

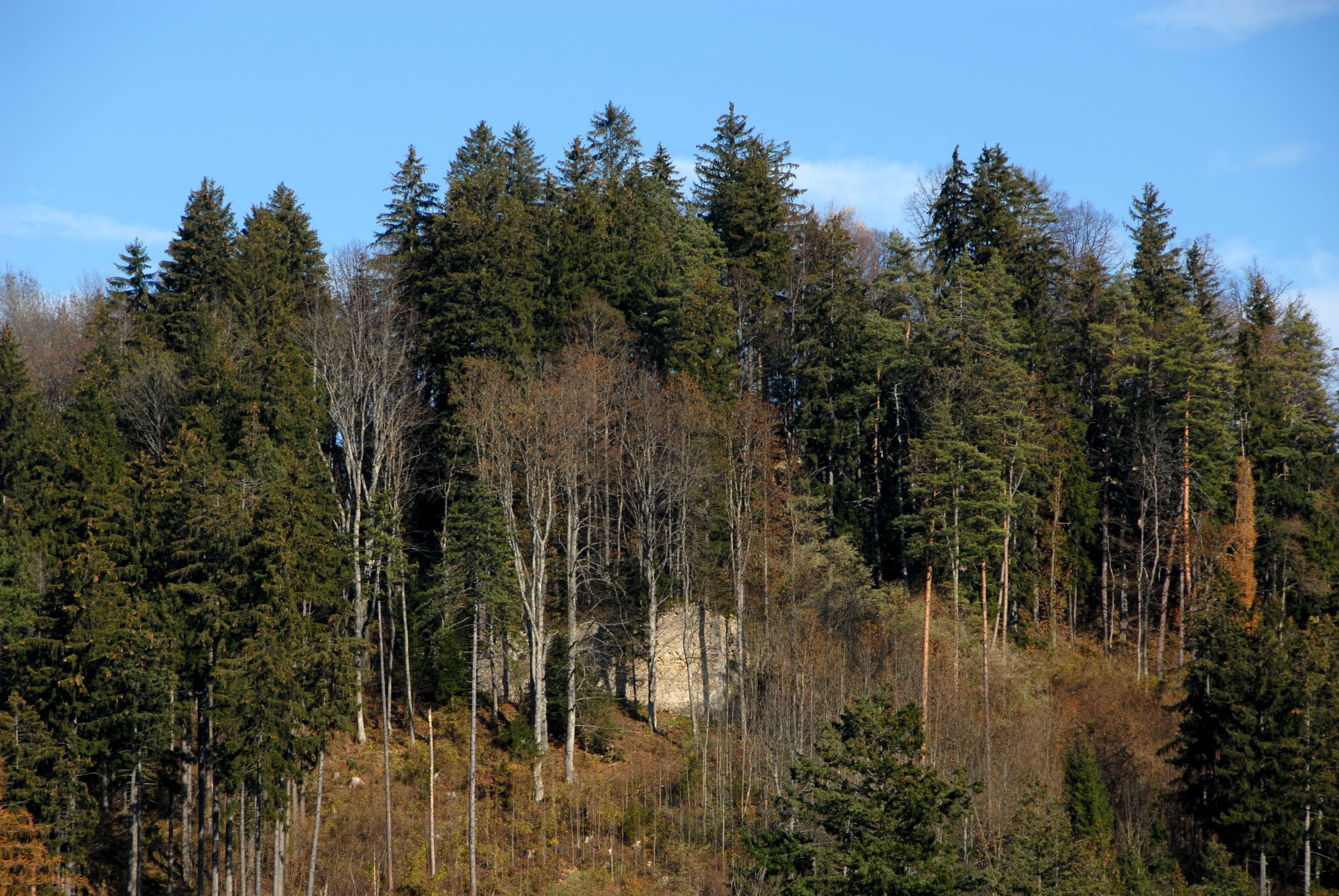
Sonnegg, Castle ruins

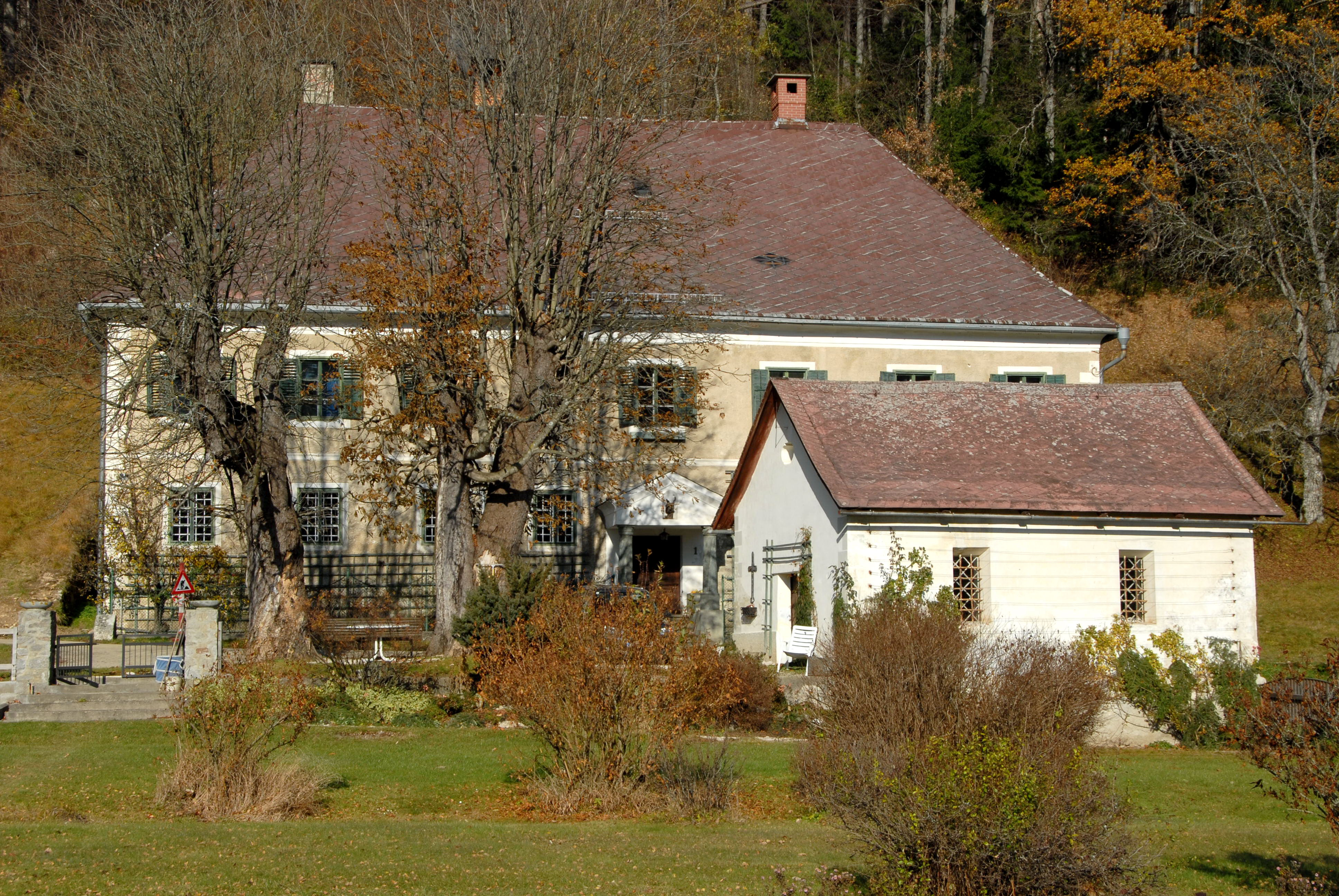
Sonnegg, Manor
