= Jaun Valley =

Valley in Austria

Geography
- Coordinates: 46°37′17″N 14°39′06″E

Jaun Valley (German: Jauntal, Slovene: Podjuna) is a valley in Carinthia, Austria, between the upper Drava and the Karawanks, east of the city of Klagenfurt.

Unlike the Gail Valley, the Jaun Valley is not named after a river, but after the ancient Roman settlement of Juenna. Nonetheless, the German name has been traditionally deconstructed as Jaun Valley in English for well over a century and continues to be used today.

== See also ==
- Jaun Valley dialect
- Mark an der Drau
