= Bleiburg =

Bleiburg Pliberk
- Municipality
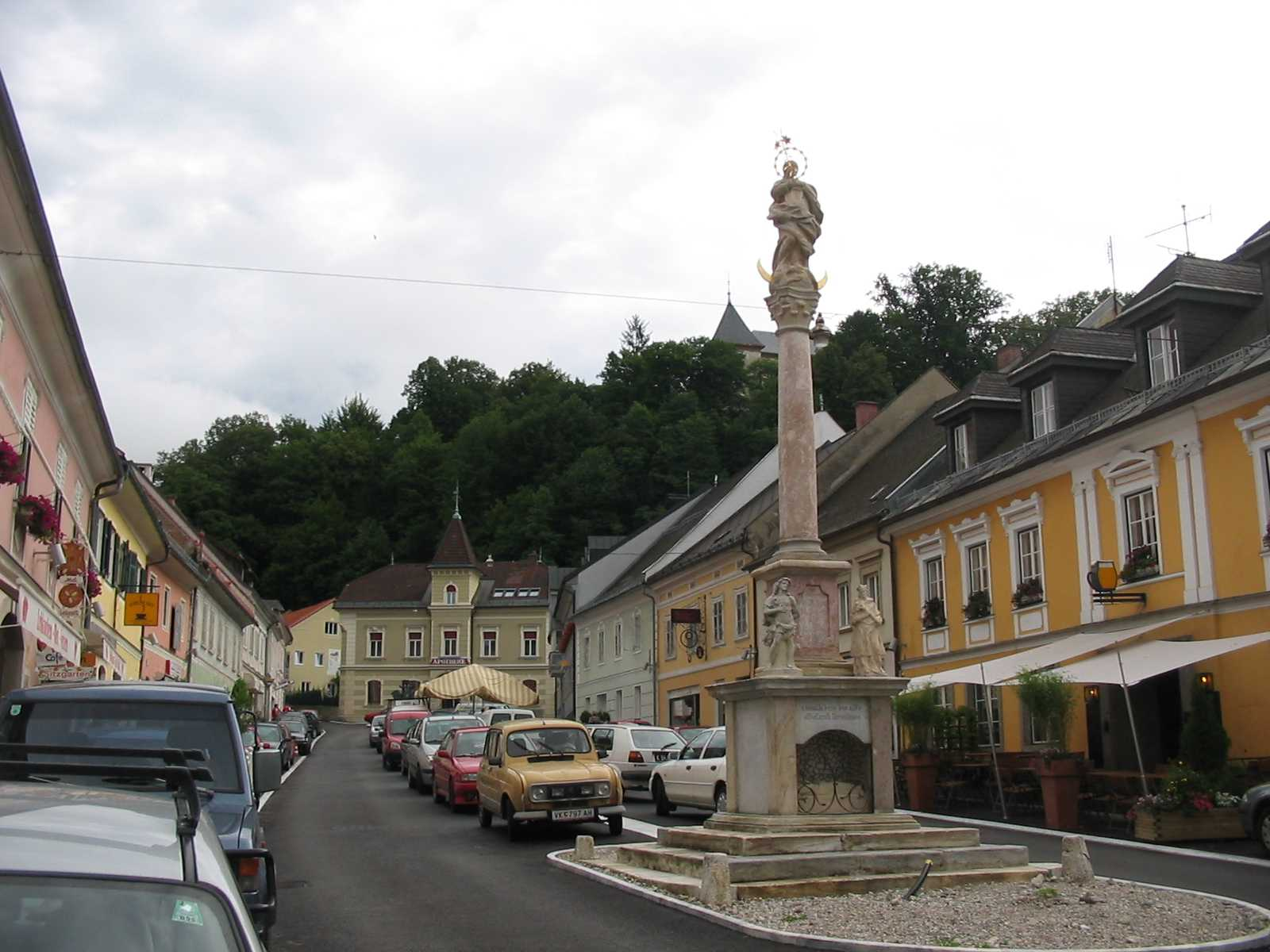
- Main square with plague column

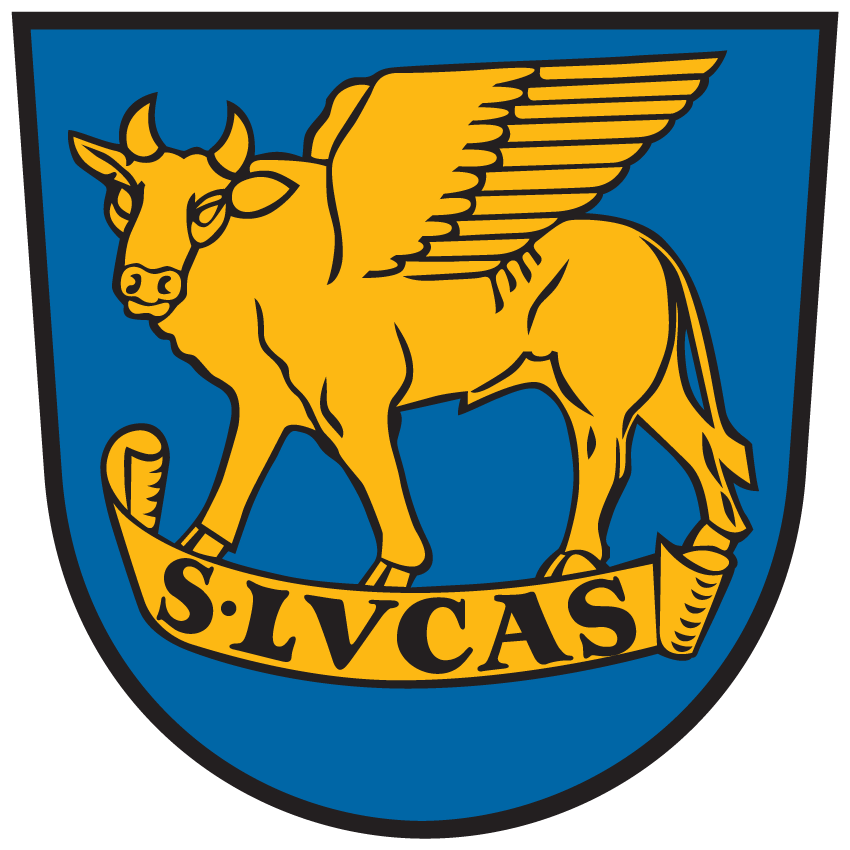
- Coat of arms

- Location within Austria Bleiburg (Austria)
- Coordinates: 46°35′24″N 14°47′56″E
- Country: Austria
- State: Carinthia
- District: Völkermarkt

Government
  - Mayor: Stefan Visotschnig († October 2025) (SPÖ)

Area
  - Total: 69.77 km^{2} (26.94 sq mi)
- Elevation: 479 m (1,572 ft)

Population (2018-01-01)
  - Total: 4,072
  - Density: 58.36/km^{2} (151.2/sq mi)
- Time zone: UTC+1 (CET)
  - Summer (DST): UTC+2 (CEST)
- Postal code: 9150
- Area code: 04235
- Vehicle registration: VK
- Website: www.bleiburg.at

Bleiburg (Slovene: Pliberk) is a small town in the south Austrian state of Carinthia (Koroška), south-east of Klagenfurt, in the district of Völkermarkt, some four kilometres (2.5 miles) from the border with Slovenia and the Slovenian town of Holmec.

The municipality consists of the twelve Katastralgemeinden Aich (Dob), Bleiburg, Grablach (Grablje), Kömmel (Komelj), Moos (Blato), Oberloibach (Libuče), Rinkenberg (Vogrče), Sankt Margarethen (Šmarjeta), Schattenberg (Senčni kraj), Unterloibach (Libuče), Weißenstein (Belšak) and Woroujach (Borovje). According to a 2001 census, 30.4% of the population are Carinthian Slovenes (in 1971, they were 52.8%).

== Geography ==
The border town is located in the valley of the Feistritz creek, a right tributary of the Drava, north of the Peca massif of the Karawanks mountain range. It is home to a district court, military barracks and to the local productive and services industry. The name of Bleiburg, literally meaning 'Lead Castle', can be attributed to the lead mining operations in the Peca mountain.

== History ==
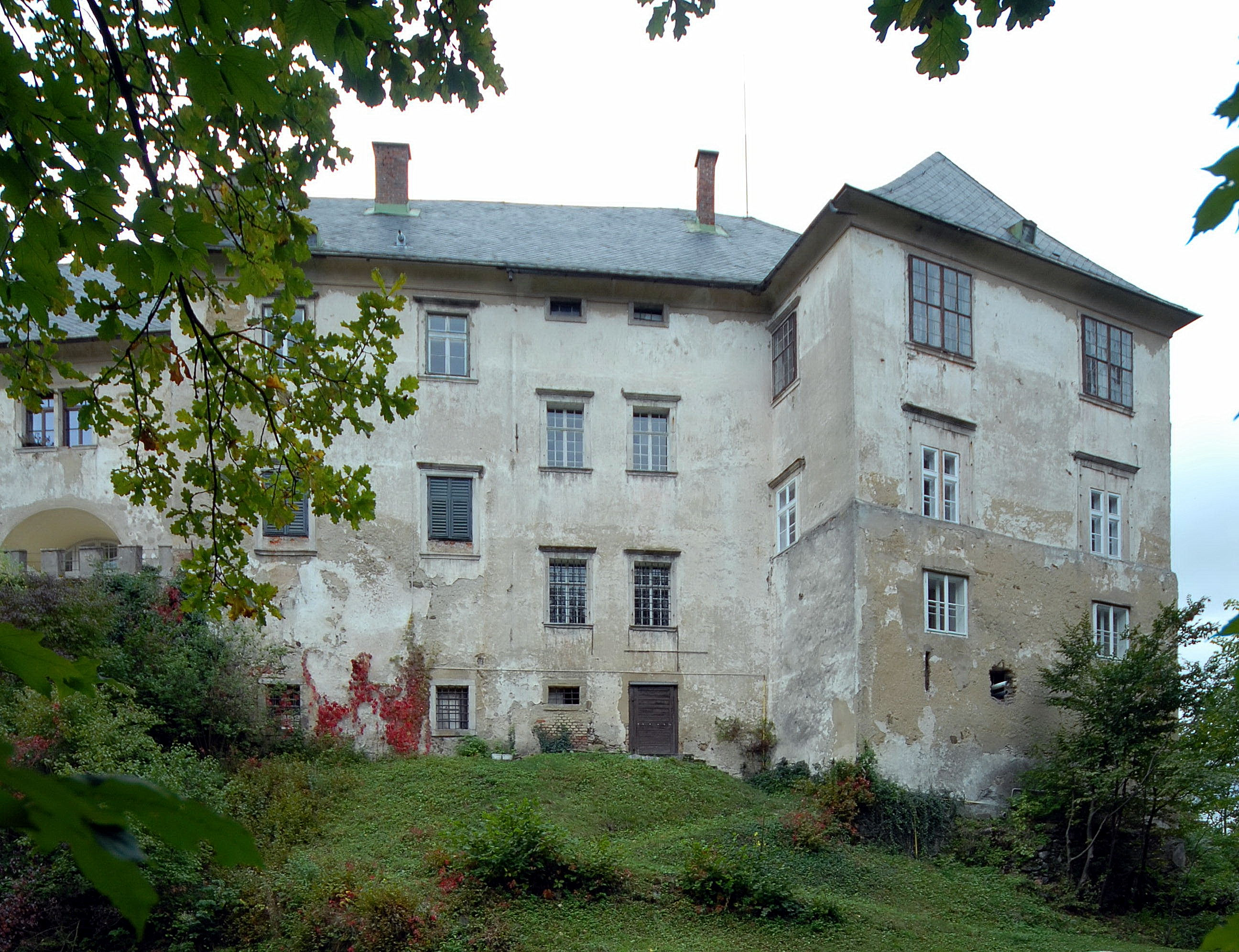
Bleiburg Castle

The area was part of the Liupicdorf estate in the Duchy of Carinthia, which about 1000 Bishop Albuin I of Brixen dedicated to his brother Count Aribo. The oldest surviving document mentioning the town as castrum et forum Pliburch is dated to 1228. The comital estates of Bleiburg Castle were seized by the Habsburg dukes Albert III and Leopold III in 1369, the settlement received town privileges the next year. On 16 March 1393 Duke Albert granted the citizens the right to hold the annual Wiesenmarkt ('meadow market') fair, which has taken place on 1 September every year up to today at least since 1428. In 1601 the castle was ceded to the Thurn-Valsassina comital family, who had it rebuilt in its present Renaissance style and still owns it today, together with the nearby Castle Hagenegg in Eisenkappel-Vellach.

Between 1918 and 1920, Bleiburg was occupied by Yugoslav troops. In spite of the overwhelming Slovene majority in the area, the town remained in Austria after the dissolution of the Austro-Hungarian Empire along national/ethnic lines after the end of World War I. In the Carinthian Plebiscite of 1920, in fact, the inhabitants of southern Carinthia rejected the proposal to unite with the Kingdom of Serbs, Croats and Slovenes (the later Yugoslavia), and chose to remain in Austria. In the constituency of Bleiburg, however, a slim majority of the population (51%) cast its vote for Yugoslavia. In the territory of the present-day municipality of Bleiburg, 59.8% of the voters chose Yugoslavia over Austria.

=== Bleiburg repatriations ===
On 15 May 1945, the Independent State of Croatia capitulated to the victorious Yugoslav Army in Bleiburg. It was the initial location of a series of extrajudicial executions during the course of which Partisans killed tens of thousands of Ustaše, Croatian Home Guard, Slovene Home Guard, Serbian Chetniks, and others who had surrendered to the British forces in Allied-occupied Austria and been repatriated in Operation Keelhaul. Modern historians estimate that between 50,000 and 80,000 people were killed in the Bleiburg repatriations and subsequent post-war reprisals resulting from those repatriations.

=== Town sign controversy ===
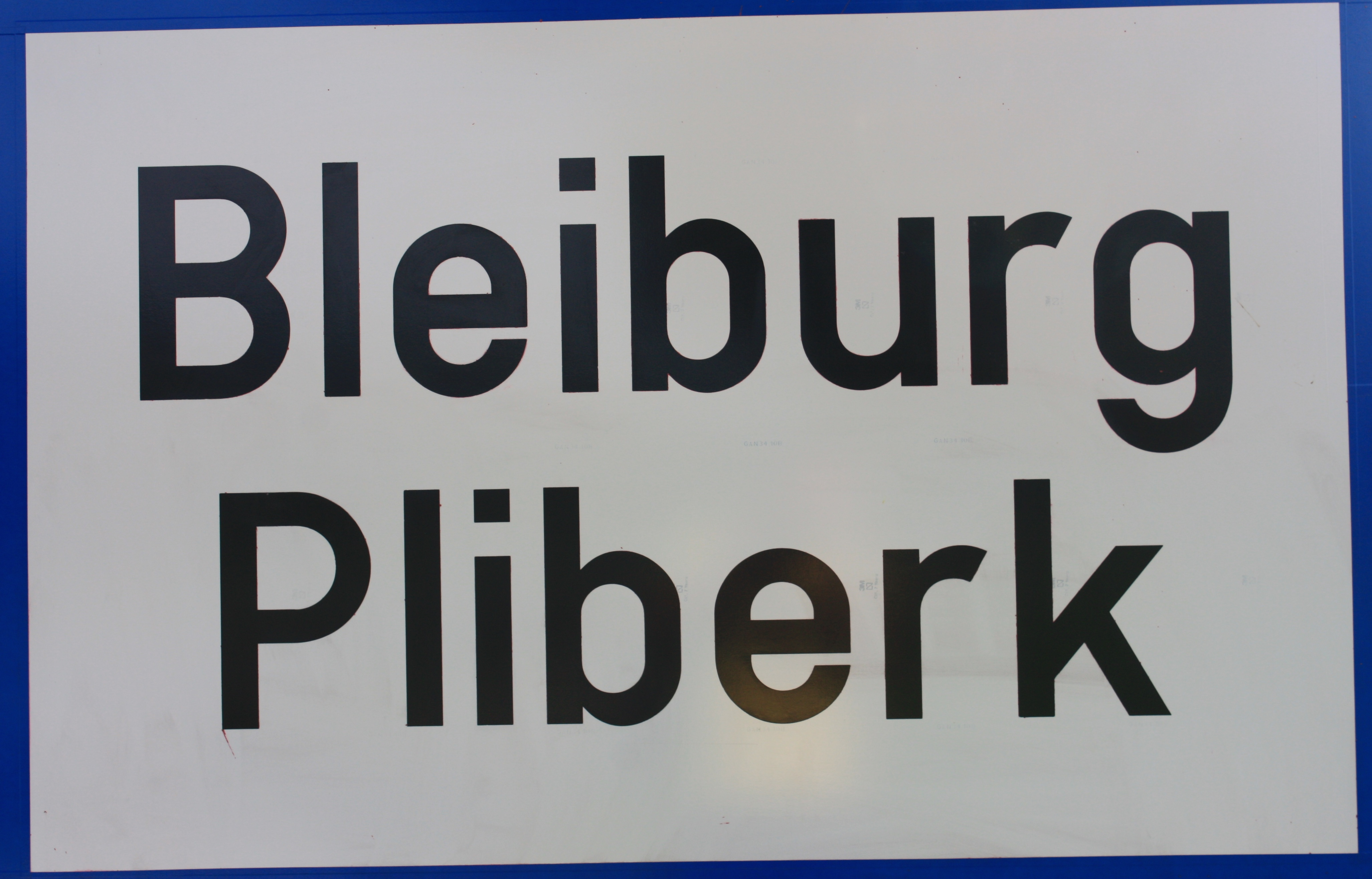
Town sign, 2010 condition

Bleiburg/Pliberk became famous in Austrian and Slovenian media in the years 2005 and 2007, due to a long controversy over the erection of a bilingual place name. The controversy was part of a decade-long Carinthian "place sign struggle" (Ortstafelstreit, Slovene: Boj za postavljanje dvojezičnih napisov) between representatives of the Carinthian Slovenes and right-wing politicians of the German-speaking mainstream society.

In December 2005, the Constitutional Court of Austria ruled that the topographic sign at the entrance to the town of Bleiburg was unconstitutional, since it was written only in German, and ordered the erection of a bilingual, German-Slovene sign. In February 2006, the Carinthian governor Jörg Haider made a great stir by personally moving the German sign for a few meters, hoping to create a new legal situation that would require a new decision of the Constitutional Court.

However, already in March 2006, the district commissioner of Völkermarkt issued an official ordinance, enforcing the erection of a bilingual sign in accordance to the decision of the Court. Nevertheless Governor Jörg Haider refused to carry out the ordinance, further fanning the controversy's flames. In August of the same year, Haider personally added a small plaque with the Slovene name of the town (Pliberk) under the German one. In December 2006, the Austrian Constitutional Court declared such action illegal, reiterating its decision that proper bilingual signs should be erected.

In February 2007, the Carinthian Regional Prosecution started a legal procedure against Governor Haider and his deputy Gerhard Dörfler for official misconduct in the case of the Bleiburg place sign. Investigations were scrapped after the governor had died in a traffic accident on 11 October 2008. Upon another verdict by the Constitutional Court on 9 July 2010, proper bilingual signs were finally erected at the behest of Haider's successor Gerhard Dörfler.

== Gallery ==
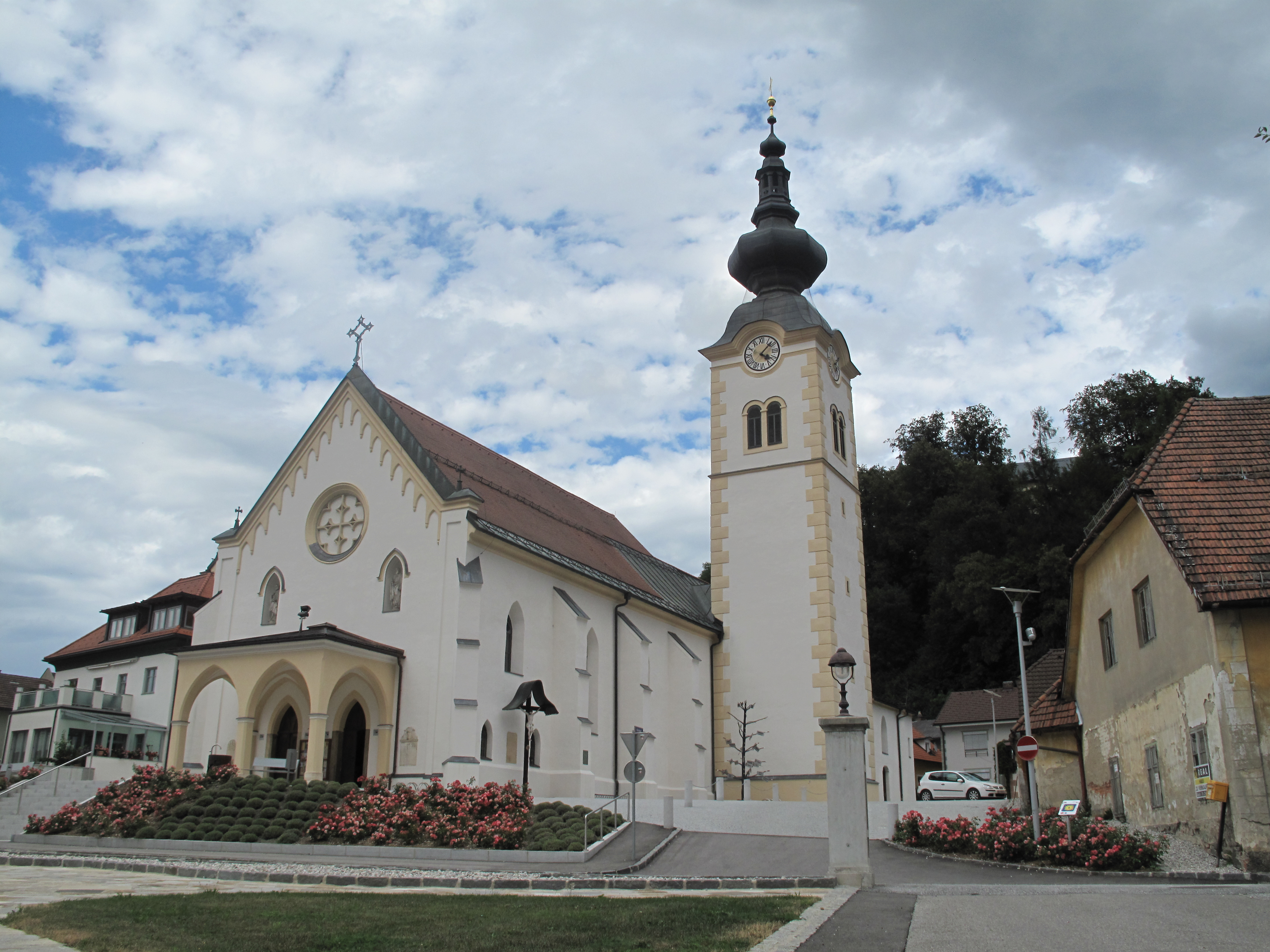
Bleiburg, church

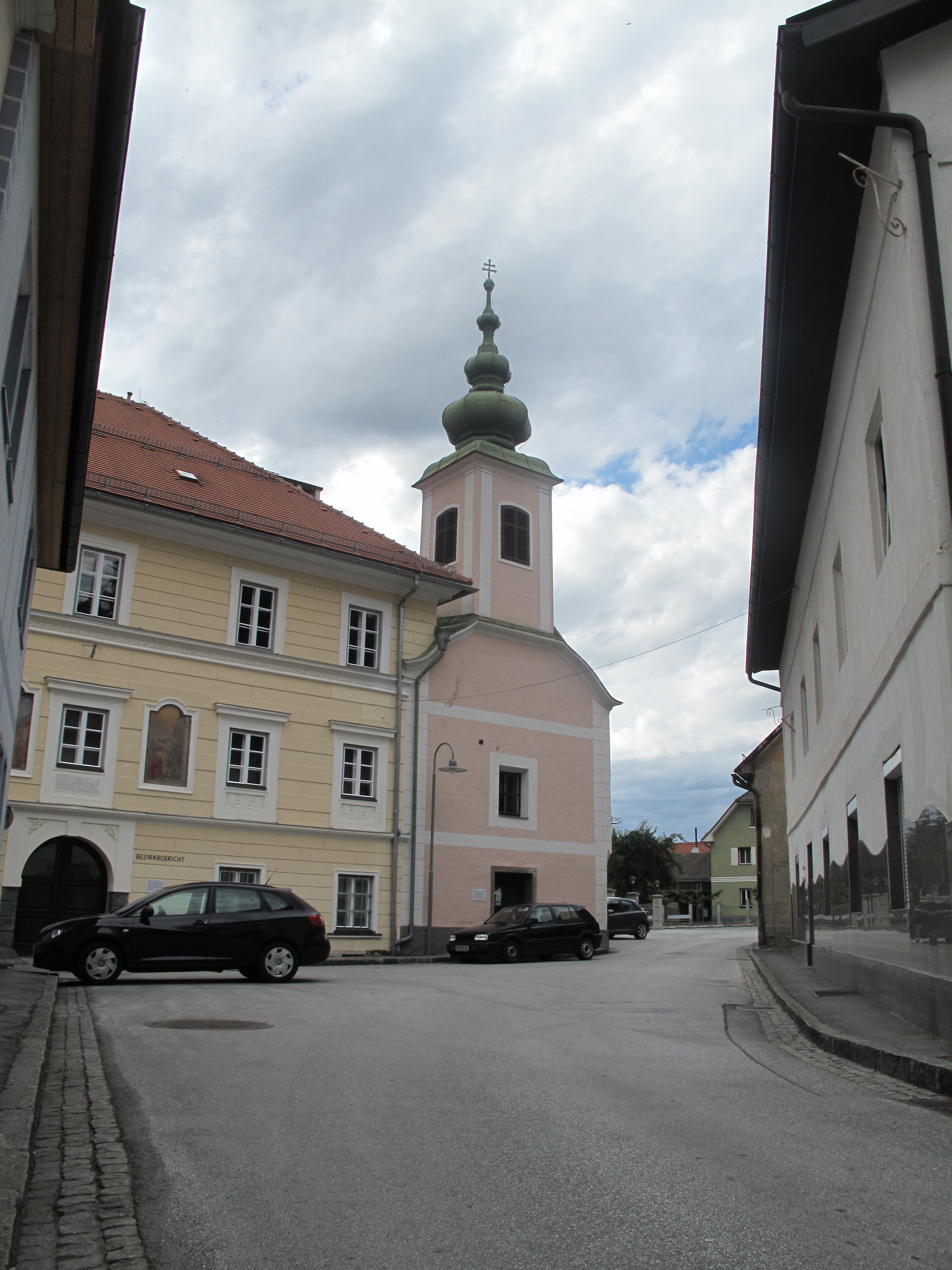
Bleiburg, view to a street with another church

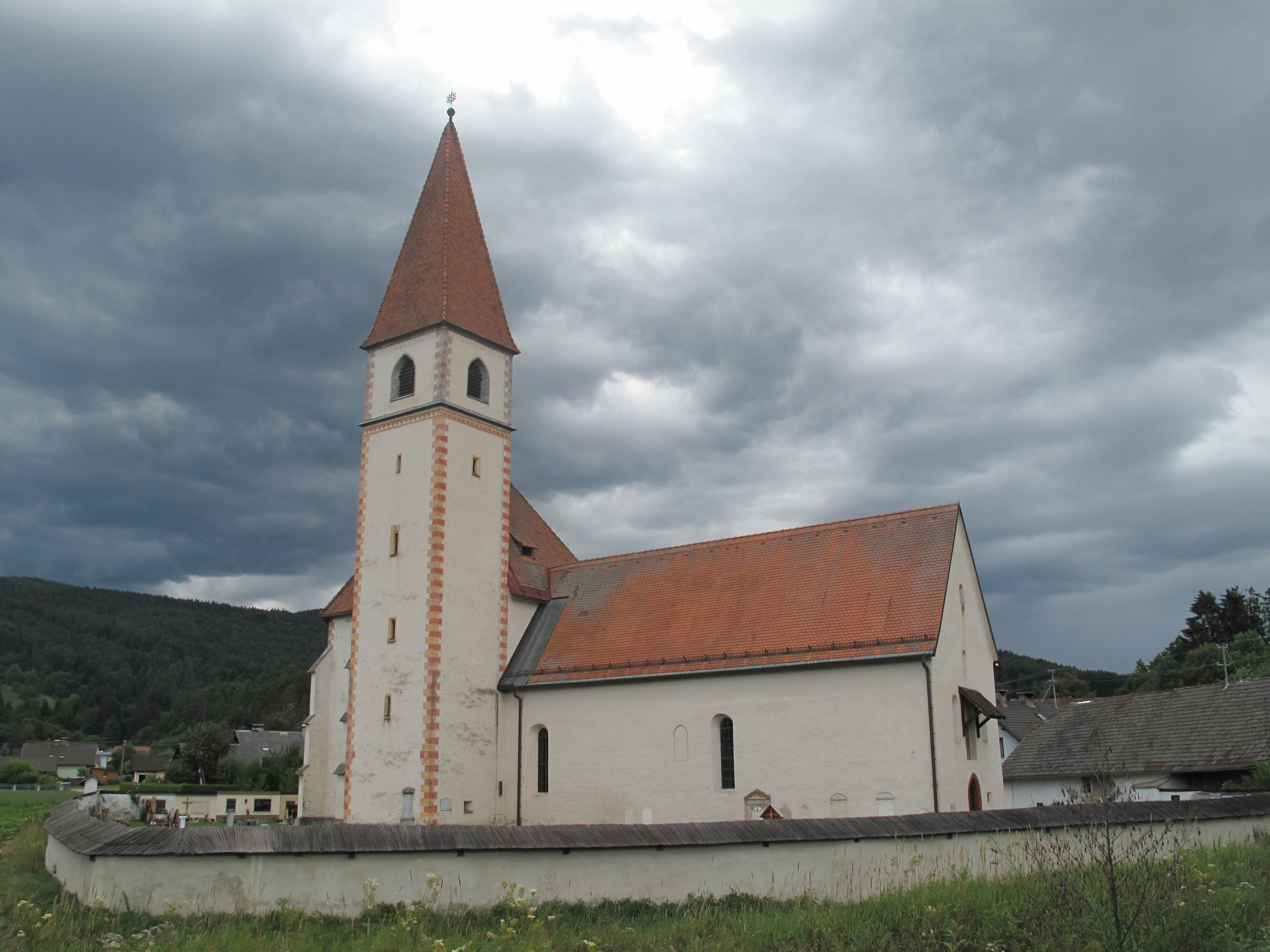
Einersdorf, church

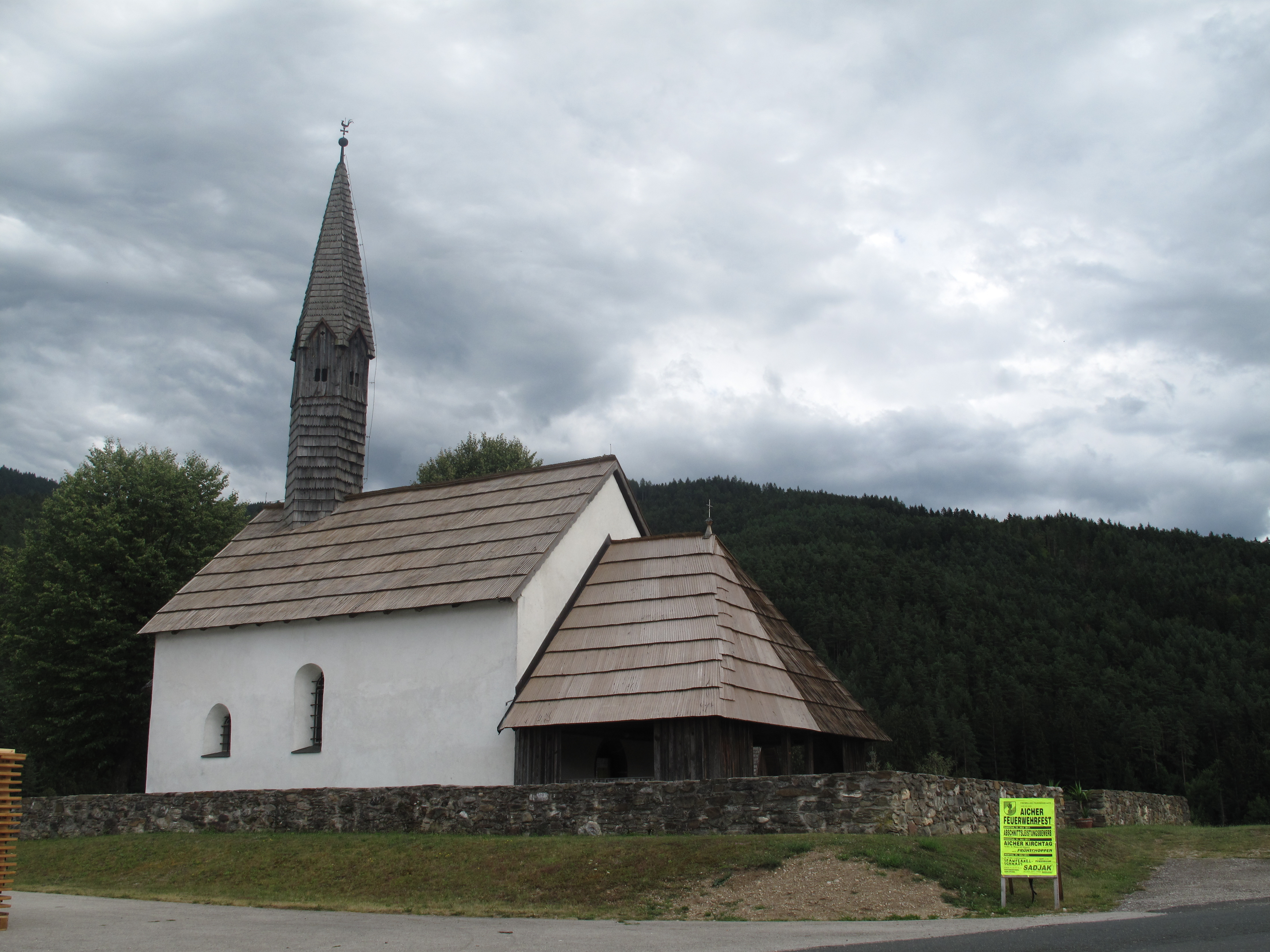
Aich. chapel

== Politics ==
Seats in the municipal council (elections as of 2003):

- Austrian People's Party: 9
- Social Democratic Party of Austria (SPÖ): 8
- Enotna Lista: 5
- Freedom Party of Austria: 1

The mayor of Bleiburg is Stefan Visotschnig from SPÖ.

== Notable people ==
- Milka Hartman (1902–1997), Slovenian poet
- Kiki Kogelnik (1935–1997), Austro-American artist
- Johann Kresnik (1939–2019), Austrian dancer, theater director
- Anton Webern (1883–1945), Austrian composer whose family estate, "Preglhof", was located in the countryside near Bleiburg

== Sources ==
- Geiger, Vladimir (2015). "Stradanja Hrvata u poraću 1945. godine". Časopis za suvremenu povijest. 47 (3): 705–748.
- Geiger, Vladimir (2012). "Vrijeme zločina, vrijeme prikupljanja podataka: Demografske i statističke procjene gubitaka". Radovi Zavoda za hrvatsku povijest. 44: 339–362.
- Portmann, Michael (2010). "Communist Retaliation and the Postwar Mass Killings in Yugoslavia". Jahrbücher für Geschichte Osteuropas. 58 (3): 381–411.
- Portmann, Michael (2006). "The Repatriations from Austria in 1945 and the Post-War Mass Killings". Contemporary European History. 15 (2): 229–248. doi:10.1017/S0960777306003211.
- Tomasevich, Jozo (2001). War and Revolution in Yugoslavia, 1941–1945: Occupation and Collaboration. Stanford: Stanford University Press. p. 755.
- Goldstein, Ivo (2008). Hrvatska 1918–2008. Zagreb: Novi Liber. p. 744.
- Poročilo Komisije Vlade Republike Slovenije za reševanje vprašanj prikritih grobišč. Vlada Republike Slovenije. 2005.
