= Lipuš =

Lipuš or Lipus is a Slovene-language surname. Notable people with the surname include:

- Cvetka Lipuš (born 1966), Austrian poet writing in Slovenian
- Florjan Lipuš (born 1937), Carinthian Slovene writer
- Gabriel Lipuš (born 1965), Austrian (Carinthian Slovene) singer, singing teacher and composer
- Rudolf Lipus (1893–1961), German artist

== See also ==
- Low intensity pulsed ultrasound (LIPUS), a medical technology
