= Carinthian Slovenes =

Ethnic group in Austria

Carinthian Slovenes or Carinthian Slovenians (Slovene: Koroški Slovenci; German: Kärntner Slowenen; Italian: Sloveni della Carinzia) are the minority of Slovene ethnicity, living within borders of the Austrian state of Carinthia, neighboring Slovenia. Their status of the minority group is guaranteed in principle by the Constitution of Austria and under international law, and have seats in the National Ethnic Groups Advisory Council.

== History ==
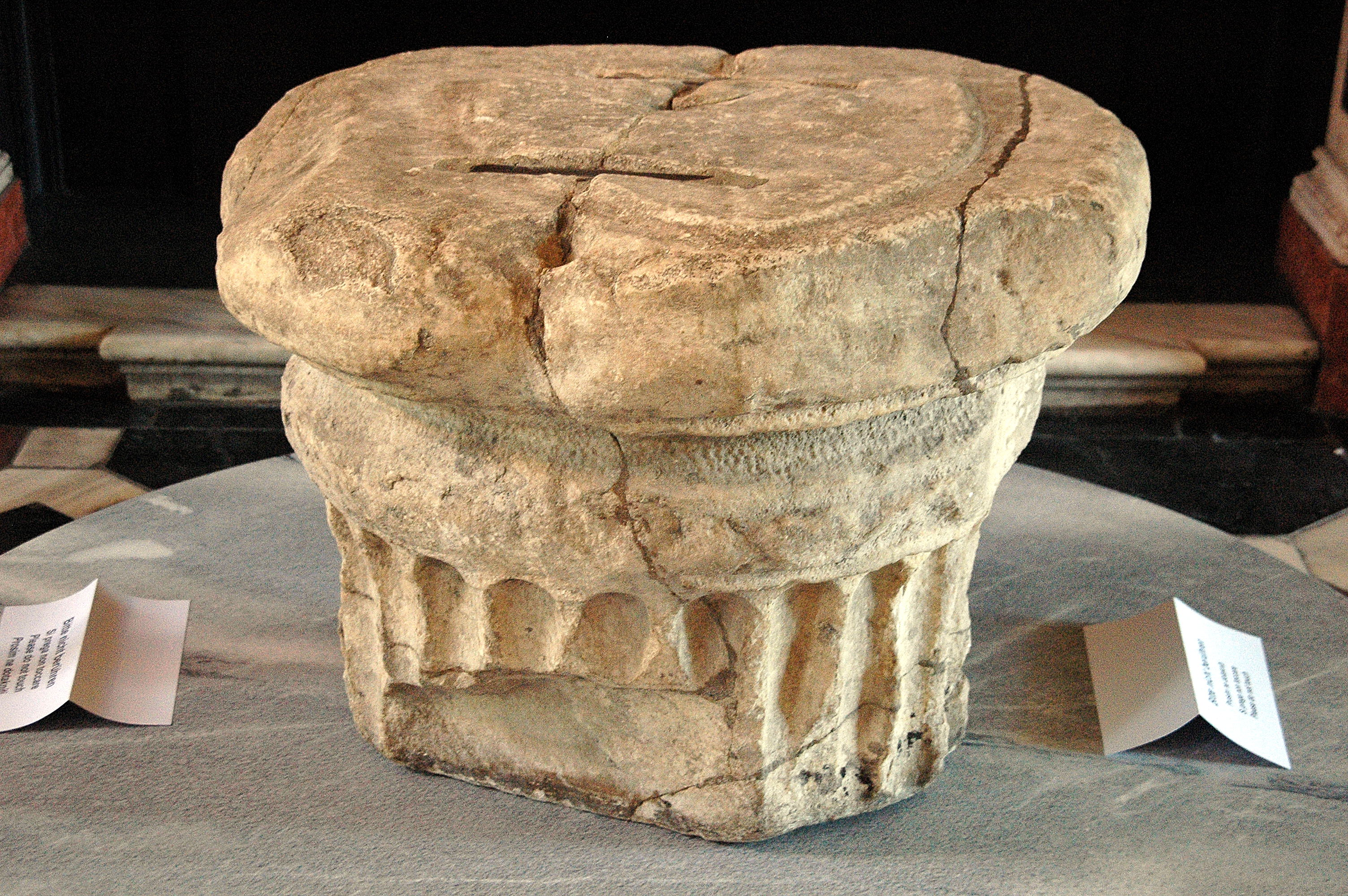
The Prince's Stone on which Carantanian princes were enthroned

The present-day Slovene-speaking area was initially settled towards the end of the early medieval Migration Period by, among others, the West Slavic peoples, and thereafter eventually by the South Slavs, who became the predominant group (see Slavic settlement of Eastern Alps). A South Slavic informal language with western Slavonic influence arose. At the end of the migration period, a Slavic proto-state called Carantania, the precursor of the later Duchy of Carinthia, arose; it extended far beyond the present area of the present state and its political center is said to have lain in the Zollfeld Valley.

In the mid 8th century, the Carantanian Prince Boruth, embattled by the Avars, had to pledge allegiance to Duke Odilo of Bavaria. The principality became part of Francia and the Carolingian Empire under Emperor Charlemagne, and, in consequence, was incorporated as the Carinthian march of the Holy Roman Empire. As a result of this, German noble families became gradually prevalent, while the rural population remained Slavic.

Finally, Bavarian settlers moved into Carinthia, where they established themselves in the hitherto sparsely populated areas, such as wooded regions and high valleys. Only here and there did this lead to the direct displacement of Slavs (the development of the Slovene nation did not take place until later). A language border formed which kept steady until the 19th century. The local capital Klagenfurt, at this time a bilingual city with social superior German usage and Slovene-speaking environs, was also a centre of Slovene culture and literature.

=== Carinthian Plebiscite ===
With the emergence of the nationalist movement in the late Austro-Hungarian Monarchy, there was an acceleration in the process of assimilation; at the same time the conflict between national groups became more intense.

1920 voting results for Austria (red) and for Yugoslavia (green)

In the course of the dissolution of Austria-Hungary at the end of World War I, the Carinthian provisional assembly proclaimed the accession to German-Austria, whereafter the newly established State of Slovenes, Croats and Serbs for a short time occupied the districts where the greater majority still used Slovene. Armed clashes followed and this issue also split the Slovene population. In the plebiscite zone in which the Slovene-speaking proportion of the population constituted about 70%, 59% of those who voted came out to remain with the First Austrian Republic. In the run-up to the plebiscite the state government gave an assurance that it would promote and support the retention of Slovene culture. These conciliatory promises, in addition to economic and other reasons, led to about 40% of the Slovenes living in the plebiscite zone voting to retain the unity of Carinthia. Voting patterns were, however, different by region; in many municipalities there were majorities who voted to become part of the Kingdom of Serbs, Croats and Slovenes (mainly in the south).

Initially, the Slovene community in Carinthia enjoyed minority rights like bilingual schools and parishes, Slovene newspapers, associations and representatives in municipal councils and in the Landtag assembly.

=== Interwar Period ===
Similar to other European states, German nationalism in Austria grew in the interwar period and ethnic tensions led to an increasing discrimination against Carinthian Slovenes. Promises made were broken, assimilation was forced by dividing the Carinthian Slovenes into "nationalist" Slovenes proper and "Germanophile" Windisch, even by denying that their language – a Slovene dialect with a large number of words borrowed from German – was Slovene at all.

=== Nazi persecution and anti-Nazi resistance during World War II ===
The persecution increased with the 1938 Anschluss and escalated in 1942, when Slovene families were systematically expelled from their farms and homes and many were also sent to Nazi concentration camps, such as Ravensbrück, where the multiple-awarded writer Maja Haderlap's Grandmother was sent to.

Following the Nazi persecution, Slovene minority members – including the awarded writer Maja Haderlap's grandfather and father – joined the only Anti-Nazi military resistance of Austria, i.e. Slovene Partisans. Many returned to Carinthia, including its capital Klagenfurt, as part of Yugoslav Partisans. Families whose members were fighting against Nazis as resistance fighters, were treated as 'homeland traitors' by the Austrian German-speaking neighbors, as described by Maja Haderlap, after the WWII when they were forced by the British to withdraw from Austria.

=== Austrian State Treaty ===
As the Nazi rule had strongy reinforced the stigmatization of Slovene language and culture, anti-Slovene sentiments continued after WWII amongst large swaths of the German-speaking population in Carinthia.

On 15 May 1955, the Austrian State Treaty was signed, in Article 7 of which the "rights of the Slovene and Croat minorities" in Austria were regulated. In 1975, the electoral grouping of the Slovene national group (Unity List) only just failed to gain entry to the state assembly. With the argument that in elections the population should vote for the political parties rather than according to their ethnic allegiance, before the next elections in 1979 the originally single electoral district of Carinthia was divided into four constituencies. The area of settlement of Carinthian Slovenes was divided up and these parts were in turn combined with purely German-speaking parts of the province. In the new constituencies, the Slovene-speaking proportion of the population was reduced in such a way that it was no longer possible for the representatives of national minorities to succeed in getting into the state assembly. The Austrian Center for Ethnic Groups and the representatives of Carinthian Slovenes saw in this way of proceeding a successful attempt of gerrymandering in order to reduce the political influence of the Slovene-speaking minority group.

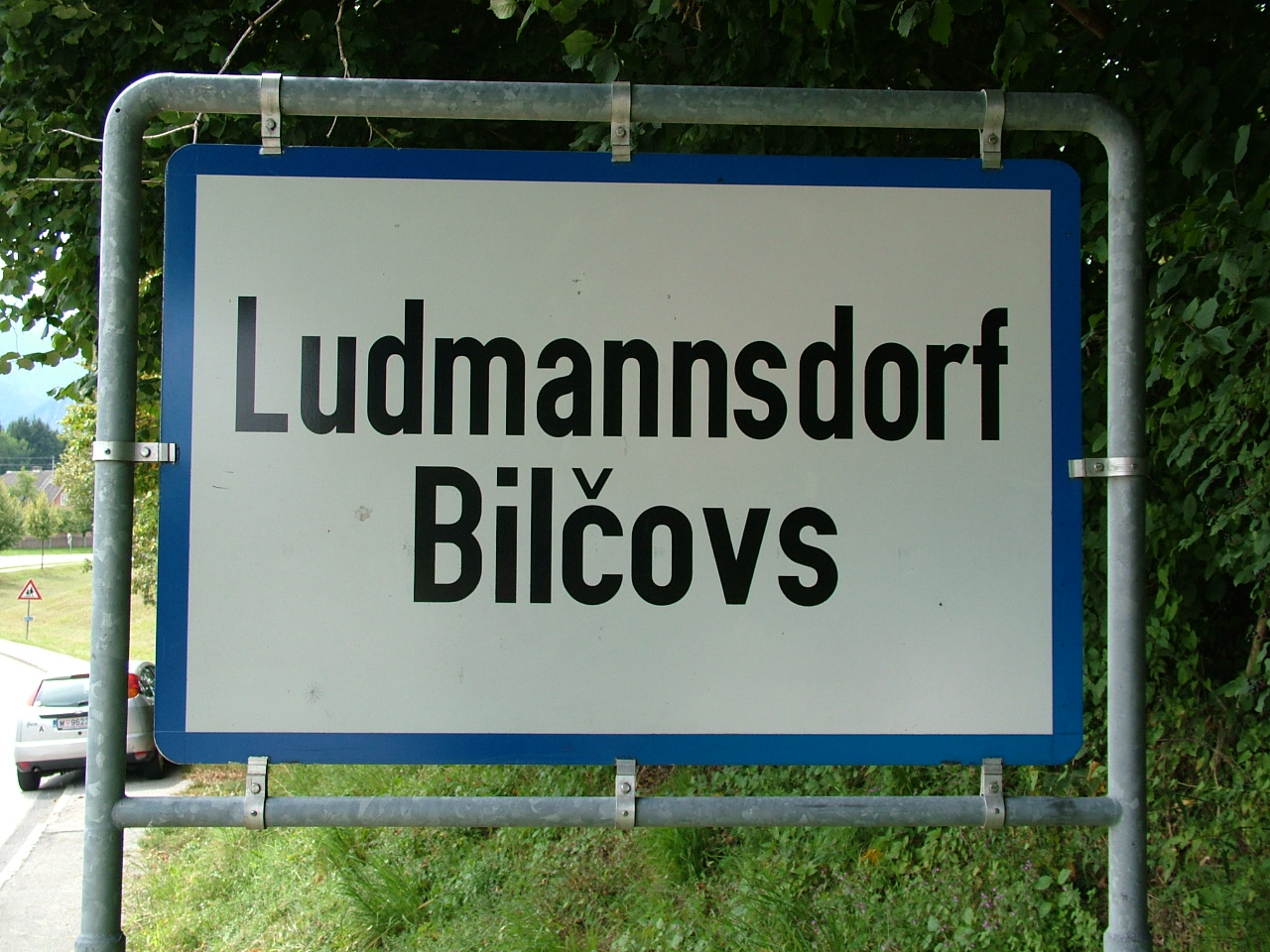
Ludmannsdorf/Bilčovs bilingual place-name sign, one of the few in southern Carinthia

In 1957, the German national Kärntner Heimatdienst (KHD) pressure group was established, by its own admission in order to advocate the interests of "patriotic" Carinthians. In the 1970s, the situation again escalated in a dispute over bilingual place-name signs (Ortstafelstreit), but thereafter became less tense. However, continuing up to the present, individual statements by Slovene politicians are interpreted by parts of the German-speaking population as Slovene territorial claims, and they therefore regard the territorial integrity of Carinthia as still not being guaranteed. This interpretation is rejected both by the Slovene government and by the organizations representing the interests of Carinthian Slovenes. The territorial integrity of Carinthia and its remaining part of Austria are said not to be placed in question at all.

=== Current developments ===
Since the 1990s, a growing interest in Slovene on the part of the German-speaking Carinthians has been perceptible, but this could turn out to be too late in view of the increase in the proportion of elderly people. From 1997, Slovene and German traditionalist associations met in regular roundtable discussions to reach a consensus. However, the success of Jörg Haider, former governor of Carinthia from 1999 to 2008, in making again a political issue out of the dispute over bilingual place-name signs showed that the conflict is, as before, still present.

== Area of Slovene settlement and proportion of the population ==
2001 census
1971 census

At the end of the 19th century, Carinthian Slovenes comprised approximately one quarter to one third of the total population of Carinthia, which then, however, included parts that in the meantime have been ceded. In the course of the 20th century, the numbers declined, especially because of the pressure to assimilate, to an official figure of 2.3% of the total population. As the pressure from German came above all from the west and north, the present area of settlement lies in the south and east of the state, in the valleys known in German as Jauntal (Slovene: Podjuna), Rosental (Slovene: Rož), the lower Lavanttal (Labotska dolina), the Sattniz (Gure) mountains between the Drau River and Klagenfurt, and the lower part of Gailtal / Ziljska dolina (to about as far as Tröpolach). Köstenberg and Diex are approximately the most northerly points of current Slovene settlement. The municipalities with the highest proportion of Carinthian Slovenes are Zell (89%), Globasnitz (42%), and Eisenkappel-Vellach (38%), according to the 2001 special census which inquired about the mother tongue and preferred language. The actual number of Carinthian Slovenes is disputed, as both the representatives of Slovene organizations and the representatives of Carinthian traditional organizations describe the census results as inaccurate. The former point to the, in part, strongly fluctuating census results in individual municipalities, which in their opinion correlate strongly with political tensions in national minority questions. Consequently, the results would underestimate the actual number of Carinthian Slovenes. The South Carinthian municipality of Gallizien is cited as an example: according to the 1951 census the proportion of Slovene speakers was 80%, whereas in 1961—in absence of any significant migratory movements and with approximately the same population—the proportion dropped to only 11%.

Census results
Year	Number of Slovenes
1818	137,000
1848	114,000
1880	85,051
1890	84,667
1900	75,136
1910	66,463
1923	34,650
1934	24,875
1939	43,179
1951	42,095
1961	24,911
1971	20,972
1981	16,552
1991	14,850
2001	13,109

As a further example, the results of the former municipality of Mieger (now in the municipality of Ebental) are cited, which in 1910 and 1923 had a Slovene-speaking population of 96% and 51% respectively, but in 1934 only 3%. After World War II and a relaxation of relations between both population groups, the municipality showed a result of 91.5% in the 1951 census. Ultimately, in 1971 in the run-up to the Carinthian place-name signs dispute, the number of the Slovenes was reduced again to 24%. The representatives of Carinthian Slovenes regard the census results as the absolute lower limit. They refer to an investigation carried out in 1991 in bilingual parishes, in the process of which there was a question about the colloquial language used by members of the parish. The results of this investigation (50,000 members of national minority groups) differed significantly from those of the census that took place in the same year (about 14,000). Carinthian traditional organizations, on the other hand, estimate the actual number of self-declared Slovenes as being 2,000 to 5,000 persons.

Municipalities	Percent of Slovenes 2001	Percent of Slovenes 1951	Percent of Slovenes 1880
Egg/Brdo	Part of Hermagor/Šmohor	56.1%	95%
Görtschach/Goriče	Part of Hermagor/Šmohor	58.4%	98.5%
St. Stefan im Gailtal/Štefan na Zilji	1.2%	N.D.	97.4%
Vorderberg/Blače	Part of St. Stefan im Gailtal/Štefan na Zilji	54.8%	99.8%
Hermagor/Šmohor	1.6%	N.D	N.D
Arnoldstein/Podklošter	2.1%	9.2%	39.7%
Augsdorf/Loga vas	Part of Velden am Wörther See/Vrba ob Jezeru	48.2%	93.8%
Feistritz an der Gail/Bistrica na Zilji	7.9%	53.4%	83.9%
Finkenstein/Bekštanj	5.7%	24.2%	96.3%
Hohenthurn/Straja vas	8.3	27.1%	98.9%
Köstenberg/Kostanje	Part of Velden am Wörther See/Vrba	40.1%	76.1%
Ledenitzen/Ledince	Part of Sankt Jakob im Rosental/Šentjakob v Rožu	37.8%	96.8%
Lind ob Velden/Lipa pri Vrbi	Part of Velden am Wörther See/Vrba	15.8%	44.5%
Maria Gail/Marija na Zilji	Part of Villach/Beljak	16.7%	95.9%
Nötsch/Čajna	0.6%	3.6%	N.D.
Rosegg/Rožek	6.1%	32.4%	96.7%
Sankt Jakob im Rosental/Št. Jakob v Rožu	16.4%	62.7%	99.3%
Velden am Wörther See/Vrba ob Jezeru	2.8%	0.9%	96.3%
Wernberg/Vernberk	1.0%	20.5%	73.2%
Ebental/Žrelec	4.2%	16.4%	62.8%
Feistritz im Rosental/Bistrica v Rožu	13.4%	47.2%	97.7%
Ferlach/Borovlje	8.3%	20.5%	61.4%
Grafenstein/Grabštajn	0.8%	7.6%	95.6%
Keutschach/Hodiše	5.6%	60.6%	96.5%
Köttmannsdorf/Kotmara vas	6.4%	45.6%	95.3%
Ludmannsdorf/Bilčovs	28.3%	85.0%	100%
Maria Rain/Žihpolje	3.9%	10.5%	55.1%
Maria Wörth/Otok	1.1%	16.3%	41.9%
Mieger/Medgorje	Part of Ebental/Žrelec	91.5%	98.1%
Poggersdorf/Pokrče	1.2%	2.8%	87%
Radsberg/Radiše	Part of Ebental/Žrelec	52.0%	100%
Schiefling/Škofiče	6.0%	38.4%	98.9%
Sankt Margareten im Rosental/ Šmarjeta v Rožu	11.8%	76.8%	92.4%
Magdalensberg/Štalenska gora	1.5%	3.1%	N.D.
Techelsberg/Teholica	0.2%	6.7%	N.D.
Unterferlach/Medborovnica	Part of Ferlach/Borovlje	47.2%	99.7%
Viktring/Vetrinj	Part of Klagenfurt/Celovec	3.3%	57.6%
Weizelsdorf/Svetna vas	Part of Feistritz im Rosental/Bistrica v Rožu	69.3%	100%
Windisch Bleiberg/Slovenji Plajberk	Part of Ferlach/Borovlje	81.3%	91.7%
Zell/Sele	89.6%	93.1%	100%
Feistritz ob Bleiburg/Bistrica pri Pliberku	33.2%	82.8%	98.7%
Bleiburg/Pliberk	30.9%	16.7%	15.5%
Diex/Djekše	6.9%	46.1%	95.8%
Eberndorf/Dobrla vas	8.6%	47.4%	90.8%
Eisenkappel/Železna Kapla	38.7%	20.1%	48%
Gallizien/Galicija	8.5%	80.1%	99.9%
Globasnitz/Globasnica	42.2%	88.7%	99.5%
Griffen/Grebinj	1.3%	34.1%	83.8%
Haimburg/Vovbre	Part of Völkermarkt/Velikovec	19.9%	98.2%
Loibach/Libuče	Part of Bleiburg/Pliberk	54.6%	92.1%
Moos/Blato	Part of Bleiburg/Pliberk	85.8%	99.8%
Neuhaus/Suha	13.4%	79.6%	N.D.
Ruden/Ruda	3.9%	51.7%	93%
Sittersdorf/Žitara vas	19.8%	84.4%	98.2%
Sankt Kanzian am Klopeiner See/Škocijan v Podjuni	13.2%	49.3%	98.4%
Sankt Peter am Wallersberg/Št. Peter na Vašinjah	Part of Völkermarkt/Velikovec	62.6%	90.7%
Tainach/Tinje	Part of Völkermarkt/Velikovec	11.1%	95.9%
Vellach/Bela	Part of Eisenkappel/Železna Kapla	73.8%	94.2%
Völkermarkt/Velikovec	2.6%	8.3%	26.6%
Waisenberg/Važenberk	Part of Völkermarkt/Velikovec	21.0%	97.4%
Municipalities	Percent of Slovenes 2001	Percent of Slovenes 1951	Percent of Slovenes 1880

== Language ==
=== Dialects ===
The Carinthian group of Slovene dialects extends beyond the present borders of Carinthia. Carinthian Slovene dialects are spoken throughout Slovenian Carinthia and extend into the Pohorje Mountains and along the upper Drava Valley in Slovenian Styria. Additionally, a Carinthian Slovene dialect is spoken in the Upper Carniolan locality of Rateče in Slovenia (close to the border with Italy), whereas in the nearby town of Kranjska Gora, a transitional dialect between Carinthian and Upper Carniolan is spoken.

Carinthian Slovenes traditionally speak four dialects, all of them belonging to the Carinthian dialect group. These are the Jaun Valley dialect, the Rosen Valley dialect, the Gail Valley dialect, and the Ebriach dialect. The former, which is influenced by the Upper Carniolan dialect, can also be regarded as a subgroup of the Jaun Valley dialect. The Carinthian dialects are particularly unadulterated. In the present German-speaking areas, the Slavic basis of place and pasture names as far as into the upper part of the Möll Valley can be demonstrated. German and Slovene have in any case exercised a reciprocal influence in tone and vocabulary on each other in the course of the centuries.

=== Windisch ===
The historic description Windisch was applied in the German-speaking area to all Slavic languages (confer Wends in Germania Slavica) and in particular to the Slovene spoken in southern Austria until the 19th century. The term is still used in part (predominantly by German nationalist circles) as an overall term for Slovene dialects spoken in Carinthia. However, because of the historical associations of the term, "a German word with pejorative overtones", it is rejected by a large part of the Carinthian Slovene population. According to linguistic standards, the assumption of a Windisch language or an eponymous Slovene dialect (as distinct from the Carinthian dialect group) is not sustainable.

For political reasons, Windisch is sometimes counted in addition to Slovene as a separate language category or as a mixed language. This perspective is also being revived by certain backward-looking groups in Slovenia and elsewhere through the rejected Venetic theory. Actually the German term Wenden is derived from the Latin Venetae, a denotation for both the ancient Adriatic Veneti and the Celtic Veneti in Gaul. From the 6th and 7th centuries onwards, the—neutral—term was applied to the people living in the Slavic principality of Carantania by German immigrants descending from Bavaria. It was perpetuated by Primož Trubar's Catechismus in der windischen Sprach, the first printed book in Slovene published in 1550, and still common during the Protestant Reformation, as noted by scholar Jernej Kopitar (1780–1844).

=== Literature after the Second World War ===
In early 1981, the novel Der Zögling Tjaž by Florjan Lipuš appeared in a German translation by Peter Handke, which led to Handke being described by the Wiener Extrablatt as "Article 7 personified" for this literary achievement. In addition to Lipuš, Handke later translated Gustav Januš. However, Slovene literature in Carinthia is made up not only of Januš and Lipuš, but also a number of other authors. Mirko Kumer, Kristo Srienc and Valentin Polanšek were part of the tradition, but in addition to Lipuš, Janko Messner was part of a small, more innovative group that is nevertheless committed to the literary tradition. Lipuš himself has developed into an outstanding belletrist. Younger prose authors include Jože Blajs, Martin Kuchling, Kristijan Močilnik and the internationally known Janko Ferk. There are a considerable number of lyric poets, Milka Hartman being outstanding. Anton Kuchling was part of this generation. Gustav Januš and Andrej Kokot, as well as those lyric poets not currently writing, namely Erik Prunč and Karel Smolle, form the next generation. A group including Janko Ferk, Maja Haderlap, Franc Merkac, Jani Oswald, Vincenc Gotthardt, Fabjan Hafner and Cvetka Lipuš that formed itself predominantly around the literary periodical Mladje (Youth) follows these lyric poets. Rezka Kanzian and Tim O. Wüster, whose works have not (as of 2006) appeared in books of their own, are part of the youngest generation. Slovene literature in Carinthia since the Second World War has displayed a clear will to live; in the 2000s, it is an emancipated literature free from provincialism. Johann (Janez) Strutz in particular has rendered outstanding services to the literature of Carinthian Slovenes from the point of view of the sociology, theory and history of literature. His book Profile der neuen slowenischen Literatur in Kärnten ("Profiles of modern Slovene literature in Carinthia"), published in 1998 in a revised and extended edition, is a much respected standard work. Maja Haderlap has taken a much-needed literary theme: the Austria's only militarily organized resistance against National Socialism – the Carinthian minority – Carinthian Slovenes as one of the non-Jewish Holocaust's victims.

== Educational system ==
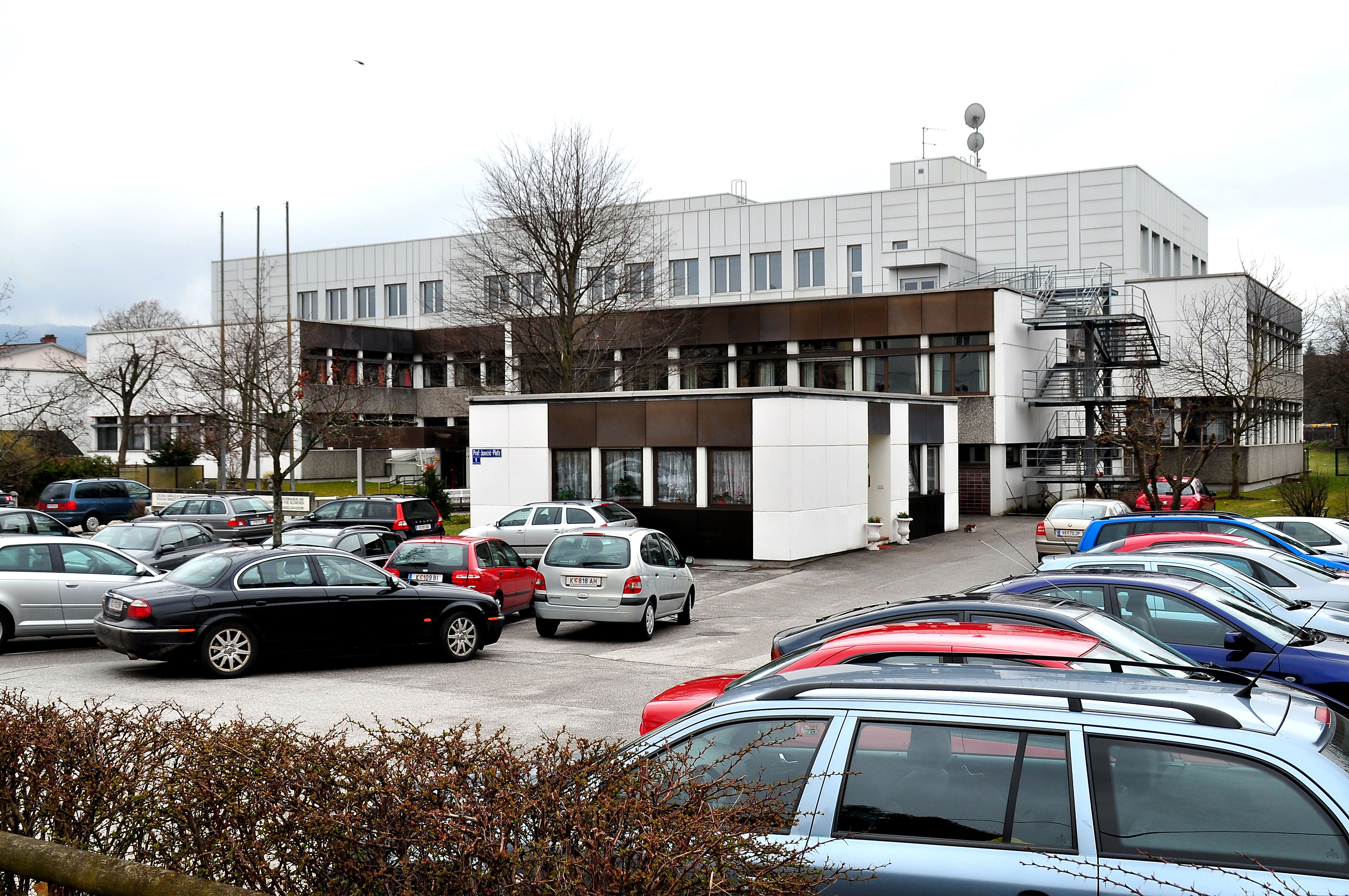
Federal Gymnasium for Slovenes

In 1848, the Ministry of Education decreed that compulsory school pupils should be taught in their respective native language. The efforts of German nationalist forces in Carinthia to change this regulation were unsuccessful until the end of the 1860s. Between 1855 and 1869, the Slovene compulsory school system lay in the hands of the Roman Catholic Church, which was traditionally friendly to the Slovenes. From 1869, there was a major alteration in the instructions regarding the use of the native language in teaching, resulting from the Imperial law on state schools, as from this time the authority maintaining the school could lay down the language of instruction. This led to a large proportion of compulsory schools being converted into so-called utraquist schools, in which Slovene was regarded as an auxiliary language to be used in teaching only until pupils had acquired an adequate command of German. Only few schools remained purely Slovene (in 1914: St Jakob in Rosental, St Michael ob Bleiburg and Zell Parish). The utraquist form of school remained in existence until 1941. This school system was rejected by the Slovene national minority as an "instrument of Germanization".

On 3 October 1945, a new law on schools that envisaged a bilingual education for all children in the traditional area of settlement of the Carinthian Slovenes, regardless of the ethnic group to which they belonged, was passed. Bilingual education took place in the first three school years, after which Slovene was a compulsory subject. After the signing of the State Treaty in 1955 and the solution of the hitherto open question of the course of the Austrian–Yugoslav border that was implicitly associated with this, there were protests against this model, culminating in 1958 in a school strike. As a result of this development, the state governor (Landeshauptmann), Ferdinand Wedenig, issued a decree in September 1958 that made it possible for parents or guardians to deregister their children from bilingual teaching. In March 1959, the educational system was again altered to the effect that henceforth pupils had to register explicitly for bilingual education. As a result of what in effect was an associated compulsion to declare one's allegiance to an ethnic minority, the numbers of pupils in the bilingual system sank considerably. In 1958, only 20.88%, and in the 1970s, only 13.9% of bilingual pupils registered for German–Slovene teaching. The minorities' school law that was altered in the course of a three-party agreement SPÖ (Social Democratic Party of Austria), ÖVP (Austrian People's Party), and FPÖ (Austrian Freedom Party) that envisaged a far-reaching separation on the basis of classes of primary school pupils into those taught bilingually and those taught only in German. The issue of whether headteachers of bilingual schools must be able to produce a bilingual qualification remains controversial.

An extension of what is being offered by schools is faced with the general development in the bilingual education system that has been described and that is viewed critically by Slovene organizations In 1957, the federal grammar school and federal secondary school for the Slovenes (Bundesgymnasium and Bundesrealgymnasium für Slowenen/Zvezna gimnazija in Zvezna realna gimnazija za Slovence) was founded, in whose building the bilingual federal commercial school (Zweisprachige Bundeshandelsakademie/Dvojezična zvezna trgovska akademija) has also been accommodated since 1991. Since 1989, there has been a secondary school (Höhere Lehranstalt) operated by the Roman Catholic Church in St Peter in Rosental (municipality of St Jakob). Following a decision by the Constitutional Court, school pupils in Klagenfurt are able to attend a public-funded bilingual primary school, in addition to the one operated by the Church. As a result of a private initiative, the Slovene music school (Kärntner Musikschule/Glasbena šola na Koroškem) was founded in 1984 and has received public funds since 1998 when a co-operation agreement was concluded with the State of Carinthia. However, the amount of this financial support (in relation to the number of pupils) contravenes the law on equality of treatment in the view of the Austrian National Minorities Center, as the other operator in the Carinthian music school system, the Musikschulwerk, receives, on a per capita basis, a higher amount. The Glasbena šola is able to continue its operations, however, with the help of contributions from the Republic of Slovenia.

An increased interest by people in South Carinthia in bilingual education has been generally perceptible since the 1990s. In the 2007/08 school year, 41% of the pupils in primary schools in the area in which the minority school system applied were registered for bilingual teaching – the proportion of children without previous knowledge of Slovene amounted to over 50%.

== Civil society institutions ==
The Slovene minority in Carinthia has a well-developed network of civil society institutions. The main "umbrella organizations" are the National Council of Carinthian Slovenes (Narodni svet koroških Slovencev – Rat der Kärntner Slowenen), representing Christian and conservative views, and the Association of Slovene Organisations (Zveza slovenskih organizacij – Zentralverband slowenischer Organisationen), closer to left-wing and liberal policies. The main political association is the Carinthian Unity List (Kärntner Einheitsliste), a joint political platform that runs at local elections. Other important organizations include:

Flag of the Carinthian Slovenes adopted by the National Council of Carinthian Slovenes

- Krščanska kulturna zveza (Christlicher Kulturverband) – Christian Cultural Association
- Slovenska prosvetna zveza (Slowenischer Kulturverband) – Slovene Cultural Association
- Slovenska gospodarska zveza (Slowenischer Wirtschaftsverband) – Slovene Economic Organization
- Skupnost južnokoroških kmetov (Gemeinschaft der Südkärntner Bauern) – Community of South Carinthian Farmers
- Slovenska planinska Družba (Alpenverein der Kärntner Slowenen) – Alpine Climbing Club of Carinthian Slovenes
- Slovenski atletski klub (Slowenischer Athletikklub) – Slovene Athletic Club
- Koroška dijaška zveza (Slowenischer Studenten Verband) – Slovene Students' Association

=== Media ===
- Nedelja – Slovene-language weekly newspaper of the diocese of Gurk
- Novice – Slovene-language weekly news-sheet
- Mohorjeva družba-Hermagoras – Catholic bilingual publisher (Klagenfurt)
- Drava Verlag – bilingual publisher (Klagenfurt)

=== Lobbying ===
The Christian cultural association and the National Council have endowed an annual award, the Einspieler Prize (named after the founder of the Hermagoras Society Publishing House, Andrej Einspieler), to individuals who have rendered outstanding services to the cause of co-existence. The prize has been awarded to, among others, the industrialist Herbert Liaunig, the governor of South Tyrol Luis Durnwalder, and professor of general and diachronic linguistics at the University of Klagenfurt Heinz Dieter Pohl, scholar and professor at the Central European University Anton Pelinka Roman Catholic prelate Egon Kapellari, Austrian politician Rudolf Kirchschläger and others.

== Notable personalities of Slovene ethnicity from Carinthia ==
- Matija Ahacel – philologist, publicist, collector of folk songs
- Tomaz Druml – Nordic combined skier
- Andrej Einspieler – priest, author and politician
- Ivan Grafenauer – literary critic and ethnologist
- Maja Haderlap – multiply awarded writer of the Angel of Oblivion novel, and poet
- Marko Hanžič – Jesuit historian
- Milka Hartmann – poet
- Valentin Inzko – diplomat, former High Representative for Bosnia and Herzegovina
- Anton Janežič – philologist
- Urban Jarnik – ethnographer
- Martin Kušej – theatre and opera director
- Cvetka Lipuš – poet
- Florjan Lipuš – writer and translator
- Matija Majar – priest, philologist, ethnographer and political activist, author of the United Slovenia program
- Angelika Mlinar – MEP
- Vinko Ošlak – essayist
- Wolfgang Petritsch – diplomat, former High Representative for Bosnia and Herzegovina
- Angela Piskernik – botanist and conservationist
- Gregorij Rožman – Bishop of Ljubljana
- Josef Stefan – mathematician and physicist
- Katja Sturm-Schnabl – literary scholar, cultural historian, linguist and slavicist
- Rudi Vouk – lawyer, political activist
- Peter Wrolich – racing cyclist
- Peter Handke – writer, Nobel laureate in literature
- Daniel Tschofenig – ski jumper

== See also ==
- Carantanians
- Slovene Lands
- Demographics of Austria
- Burgenland Croats
- Kärntner Heimatdienst
- Jörg Haider
- Duke's Chair
- Black panther (symbol)

== Sources ==
- (in German) Amt der Kärntner Landesregierung – Volksgruppenbüro (Hrsg.), Die Kärntner Slowenen, 2003
- (in German) Heinz Dieter Pohl, Die ethnisch-sprachlichen Voraussetzungen der Volksabstimmung
- Bratt Paulston and D. Peckham (eds.) ‘'Linguistic Minorities in Central and Eastern Europe'’, 1998, p. 32 ff., Clevedon (UK), Multilingual Matters, ISBN 1-85359-416-4.
- (in German) Bericht des Österreichischen Volksgruppenzentrums zur Durchführung des Europäischen Rahmenübereinkommens zum Schutz nationaler Minderheiten in der Republik Österreich Teil II (Accessed on 3 August 2006)
- (in German) Volksgruppenarchiv des ORF Kärnten (Accessed on 3 August 2006)

== Literature ==
- (in German) Andreas Moritsch (Hrsg.): ‘'Kärntner Slovenen/Koroški Slovenci 1900-2000'’ Hermagoras/Mohorjeva, Klagenfurt 2003 ISBN 3-85013-753-8
- (in German) Albert F. Reiterer: ‘'Kärntner Slowenen: Minderheit oder Elite? Neuere Tendenzen der ethnischen Arbeitsteilung.'’ Drava Verlag/Založba Drava, Klagenfurt 1996, ISBN 3-85435-252-2
- (in German) Johann Strutz: Profile der neuen slowenischen Literatur in Kärnten, by Hermagoras Verlag, Klagenfurt, 1998, ISBN 3-85013-524-1
