= KHD (disambiguation) =

KHD may refer to:

- KHD Humboldt Wedag, an engineering company that supplies machinery, parts, and services
- khd, the ISO 639-3 code for Ngkolmpu Kanum language
- Khorramabad Airport, the IATA code KHD
- Klöckner Humboldt Deutz AG, a German internal combustion engine manufacturer
- Kärntner Heimatdienst, a German nationalist advocacy group
