= Rudi Vouk =

Austrian lawyer, politician and activist

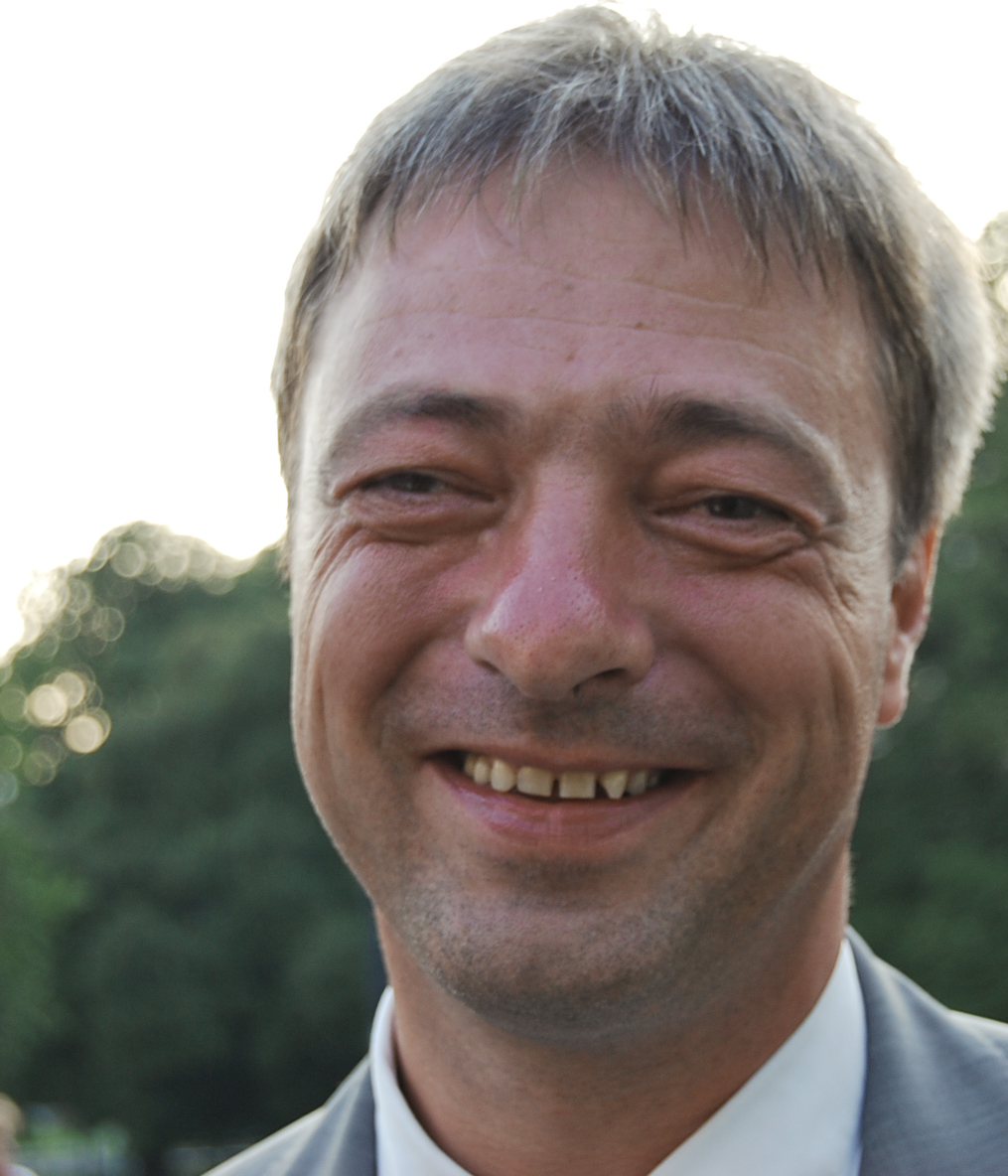
Rudi Vouk in 2008

Rudolf "Rudi" Vouk (born 19 March 1965) is an Austrian lawyer, politician and human rights activist of Slovene ethnic background, known for his legal and political fight for the minority rights of Carinthian Slovenes.

== Biography ==
He was born in Klagenfurt, Carinthia, to Carinthian Slovenes parents. After graduating from the Slovene-language high school in his hometown, he went to Vienna to study law. After finishing his studies, he returned to Carinthia to open his own private practice. He took particular interest in cases involving the legal rights of his minority.

Because of his involvement in the subject, he was elected as member of the Presidency of the political party Enotna lista. In 1997, he became a municipal councilor of Eberndorf (Dobrla vas), and in 1999, he became the chairman of the National Council of Carinthian Slovenes, one of the two central coordinating organizations of the Slovene ethnic minority in Carinthia. From 2000 to 2003, he was the chairman of the Carithian Slovenes delegacy at the National Minorities Day, but he moved to the role of Vice-Chairman in 2003. With the political influence he gained, he continued to promote the problem of legal rights of his minority at Austria's Constitutional court.

Austria received a lot of attention and concern about its handling of its minorities after his protest after the erection of bilingual signs in Sankt Kanzian am Klopeiner See (Škocijan), which he considered illegal in this unsatisfactory form.

With Vouk as its prime candidate for Carinthia, the party Liberal forum achieved a result of 1.5% of total votes at the Austrian Parliamentary elections in 2008.

In 2025, Vouk was awarded the Ferdinand Berger Award by the Documentation Centre of Austrian Resistance for his long-standing commitment to the enforcement of the rights of the Slovenian minority in Austrian Carinthia. The Centre gives the award to institutions or individuals who make a significant contribution to the prevention of neo-fascism, right-wing extremism, racism, or threats to democracy.

== Personal life ==
Vouk is married and has two daughters.
