= Eisenkappel-Vellach =

Eisenkappel-Vellach Železna Kapla - Bela
- Municipality
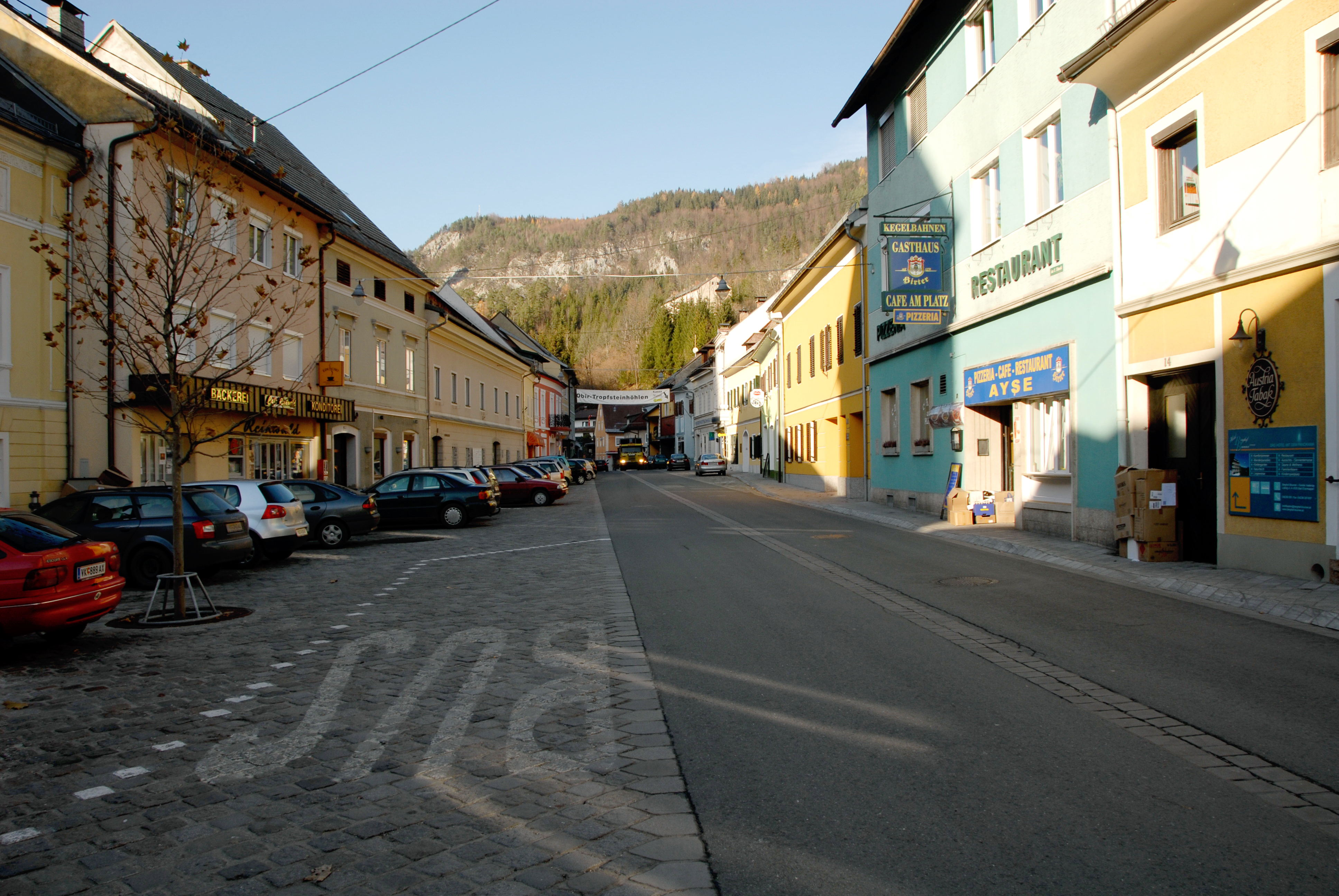
- Eisenkappel, main square

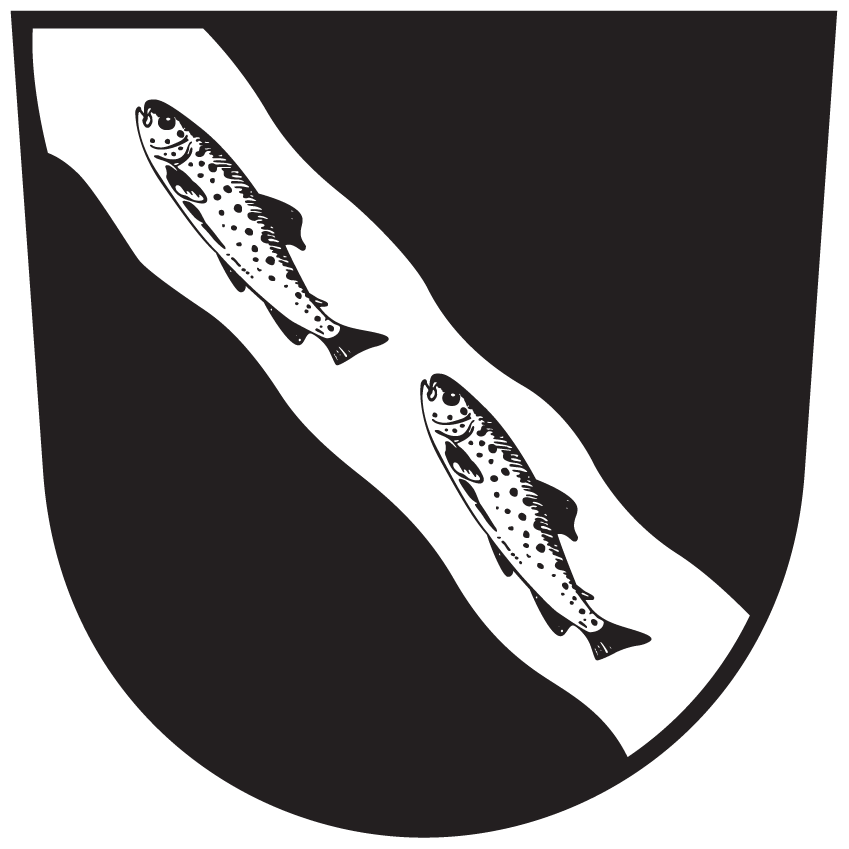
- Coat of arms

- Location within Austria Eisenkappel-Vellach (Austria)
- Coordinates: 46°29′11″N 14°35′46″E
- Country: Austria
- State: Carinthia
- District: Völkermarkt

Government
  - Mayor: Franz Josef Smrtnik (EL)

Area
  - Total: 199.13 km^{2} (76.88 sq mi)
- Elevation: 555 m (1,821 ft)

Population (2018-01-01)
  - Total: 2,306
  - Density: 11.58/km^{2} (29.99/sq mi)
- Time zone: UTC+1 (CET)
  - Summer (DST): UTC+2 (CEST)
- Postal code: 9135
- Area code: 04238
- Website: www.eisenkappel.at

Eisenkappel-Vellach (Slovene: Železna Kapla - Bela) is a market town in the Völkermarkt District in the Austrian state of Carinthia. The spa town is the southernmost municipality of Austria, close to the border with Slovenia.

== Geography ==
The municipal area covers the valley of Vellach Creek, which runs in a north–south direction from the heights of the Kamnik-Savinja Alps and the Karawanks range down to the Drava River. The Obir massif in the west contains a large dripstone cave system. Two mountain pass roads lead to Slovenia: the Seeberg Saddle in the southwest connecting it with Jezersko and the less frequented Pavlič Pass in the southeast on the road to Solčava.

Eisenkappel-Vellach consists of the main locality Bad Eisenkappel and several smaller settlements located in lateral valleys, subdivided into the Katastralgemeinden of Bad Vellach (Bela), Blasnitzen (Spodnja Plaznica), Ebriach (Obirsko), Eisenkappel (Železna Kapla), Koprein Petzen (Pod Peco), Koprein Sonnseite (Koprivna), Leppen (Lepena), Lobnig (Lobnik), Rechberg (Reberca), Remschenig (Remšenik) and Trögern (Korte).

According to the 2001 census, 38% of the population are Carinthian Slovenes, distributed over the 15 localities as follows:

Name (German)	Name (Slovene)	Population 1991	Percent Slovenes (1991)	Percent Slovenes (1951)
Blasnitzen	Zaplaznica	69	31.9%	28.1%
Ebriach	Obirsko	432	65.7%	80.2%
Koprein Petzen	Pod Peco	10	100%	92.3%
Koprein Sonnseite	Koprivna	48	89.6%	100%
Leppen	Lepena	214	68.7%	98.2%
Lobnig	Lobnik	139	82.0%	91.3%
Rechberg	Reberca	196	13.3%	46.0%
Replach	Replje	67	56.8%	81.7%
Remschenig	Remšenik	93	69.9%	95.1%
Trögern	Korte	36	86.1%	98.3%
Unterort	Podkraj	61	4.9%	31.4%
Vellach	Bela	339	52.5%	68.6%
Weissenbach	Bela	7	42.9%	55.5%
Zauchen	Suha	136	19.1%	52.8%
Bad Eisenkappel	Železna Kapla	1013	23.6%	80.2%

== History ==
The Seeberg Pass was already part of a Roman road in the Noricum province from 15 BC onwards. A Capella settlement in the Duchy of Carinthia, named after a chapel (German: Kapelle, Slovene: Kapela) held by the Bishop of Brixen, was first mentioned about 1050. The market was probably established in the early 13th century under the rule of Duke Bernhard von Spanheim. Market rights were officially confirmed in a 1267/68 deed, when the Seebergsattel was an important trade route for salt and iron ore (German: Eisen). From the 15th century onwards, the valley was the site of several ironworks. Fortifications were built against the invasions by the Ottoman forces, nevertheless Kappel was devastated in 1473. Emperor Frederick III had the town rebuilt and granted it the present-day coat of arms in 1493.

The Kappel municipality was established in 1850, it was renamed Eisenkappel in 1890, while the iron industries declined. The Eisenkappel citizens had to rely on forestry and summer tourism around several mineral springs, promoted by the opening of the Vellachtalbahn narrow gauge railway line in 1902. Eisenkappel and Vellach finally merged in 1939. In the late days of World War II the remote Peršman farm in Koprein Petzen was a strongpoint of the Slovene Partisans, the only anti-Nazi military resistance in Austria. On 25 April 1945, a Nazi SS unit stormed the building, killing eleven residents, among them seven children.

== Politics ==
Seats in the municipal Gemeinderat assembly as of March 2019 :

- Social Democratic Party of Austria (SPÖ): 8
- Enotna Lista (EL): 8
- Austrian People's Party (ÖVP): 2
- The Freedom Party of Austria (FPÖ): 1

Since March 2009, Eisenkappel-Vellach has been run by a Carinthian Slovene mayor, Franc Jožef Smrtnik. It is currently the only municipality in Carinthia with a mayor of the Slovene minority party Enotna Lista.
