= Kärntner Heimatdienst =

Austrian regional German nationalist advocacy group

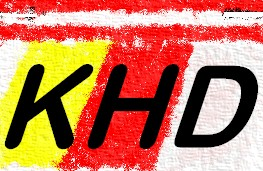
- Abbreviation: KHD
- Formation: 24 January 1957
- Type: Advocacy group
- Location: Klagenfurt, Austria
- Members: 20,000
- Chairman: Josef Feldner
- Website: khd.at

The Kärntner Heimatdienst ("Carinthian Homeland Service", KHD) is a German nationalist advocacy group in the Austrian state of Carinthia established in 1957. The KHD describes itself as a "non-party patriotic citizens' initiative". It adopts the tradition of the German-Austrian paramilitary forces during the Austrian-Slovene clashes in Carinthia in the aftermath of World War I. As an officially approved traditions association it receives direct funding by the Carinthian state.

== History ==
After World War I the provisional Carinthian state assembly on 11 November 1918 declared the accession of the former Duchy of Carinthia as a whole to the newly established Republic of German-Austria, while the new State of Slovenes, Croats and Serbs (SHS) raised claims to southern Carinthian territories with a predominantly Slovene-speaking population and had begun to occupy the lands south of the Drava river. On December 5 the Carinthian state assembly decided to array paramilitary Heimwehr troops, whose armed resistance led to several clashes of arms (Abwehrkampf), until a ceasefire was mediated by a US commission under Lt. Col. Sherman Miles on 14 January 1919.

According to the Treaty of Saint-Germain signed on 10 September 1919, the Meža valley and the Jezersko region were allocated to the Kingdom of Serbs, Croats and Slovenes. In all other Carinthian territories occupied by Yugoslav troops the treaty ordered that a referendum should be held on 10 October 1920, whether the local population would join the Austrian Republic or the SHS-state. Beforehand the paramilitary fighters, organised in the Kärntner Heimatdienst, strongly agitated against the Yugoslav claims. On October 10, a majority of 59,04% of voters in the district decided for the accession to Austria, determining the border as it exists up to today with Slovenia.

After its triumph, the Heimatdienst organization, renamed Kärntner Heimatbund (KHB) in 1924, developed aggressive anti-Slovene, anti-Slavic, pan-German, antisemitic, and anti-communist policies and also served as a platform for the illegal Nazi Party in the First Austrian Republic. After World War II the Kärntner Heimatdienst was re-established in 1957, by its own admittance "in order to strengthen the love and loyalty for the Carinthian home and the Austrian motherland". It was able to exert influence on Carinthia's political parties during various public campaigns against Slovene minority rights, such as violent attacks against bilingual German-Slovene traffic signposts in 1972, agitations for the minority census in 1976, or for the abolition of bilingual primary education in 1988.

== Today ==
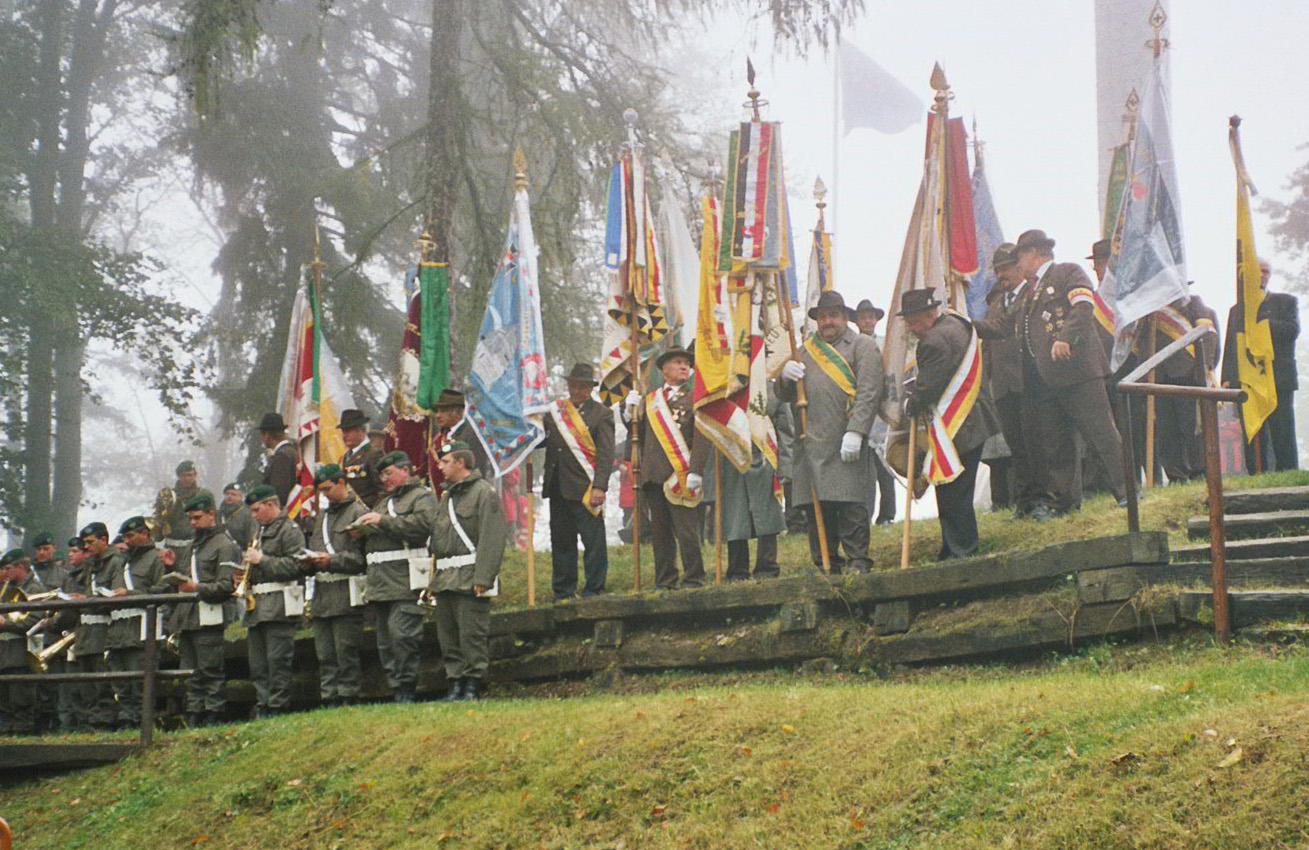
Ulrichsberg memorial service, 2006

The organization claims a membership of about 20,000, including some influential members of right-wing political parties, such as the Freedom Party of Austria and the Alliance for the Future of Austria. Since the late 1990s the association has tried for a rapprochement in several round table talks with organizations of the Carinthian Slovenes. In 2005 this dialogue group (Konsensgruppe) reached a provisional agreement on coexistence including the installation of bilingual name signs wherefore it was awarded the European Citizens' Prize in 2008.

The KHD is nevertheless reproached with proximity to far-right politics and continuous contempt for the Slovene minority rights, while the Austrian State Treaty of 1955 in its Article Seven states that organizations aiming to divest any minority rights should be prohibited. In recent years it has been in pursuit of more general populist issues like Islamophobia, the opposition to multiculturalism, or the resistance against war reparations.

The association is also a founding member of the Ulrichsberg Memorial Association (Verein für die Heimkehrergedenkstätte Ulrichsberg) which organises an annual memorial service held by World War II veterans and expellees at the Ulrichsberg, a prominent hill overlooking the historic Zollfeld plain north of the Carinthian capital Klagenfurt. The event has been regularly attended by former Waffen-SS (HIAG) members and far-right activists, the former Carinthian governor Jörg Haider delivered some of his most controversial speeches here. In 2009 Austrian Defence Minister Norbert Darabos cancelled any active support by the Austrian Bundesheer.

== See also ==
- Unity List (Austria)
