= Unity List =

Unity List may refer to the following political parties:

- Red–Green Alliance (Denmark)
- Unity List (Austria)
