= Jezerski vrh =

Jezerski vrh may refer to:

- Maja Jezercë, the highest point of the Prokletije and the entire Dinaric Alps
- Seebergsattel, a high mountain pass connecting the Austrian state of Carinthia with the Slovenian region of Carinthia.
