= 1920 Carinthian plebiscite =

Referendum in Austria to determine its border with Yugoslavia

Coordinates: 46.6325°N 14.6187°E

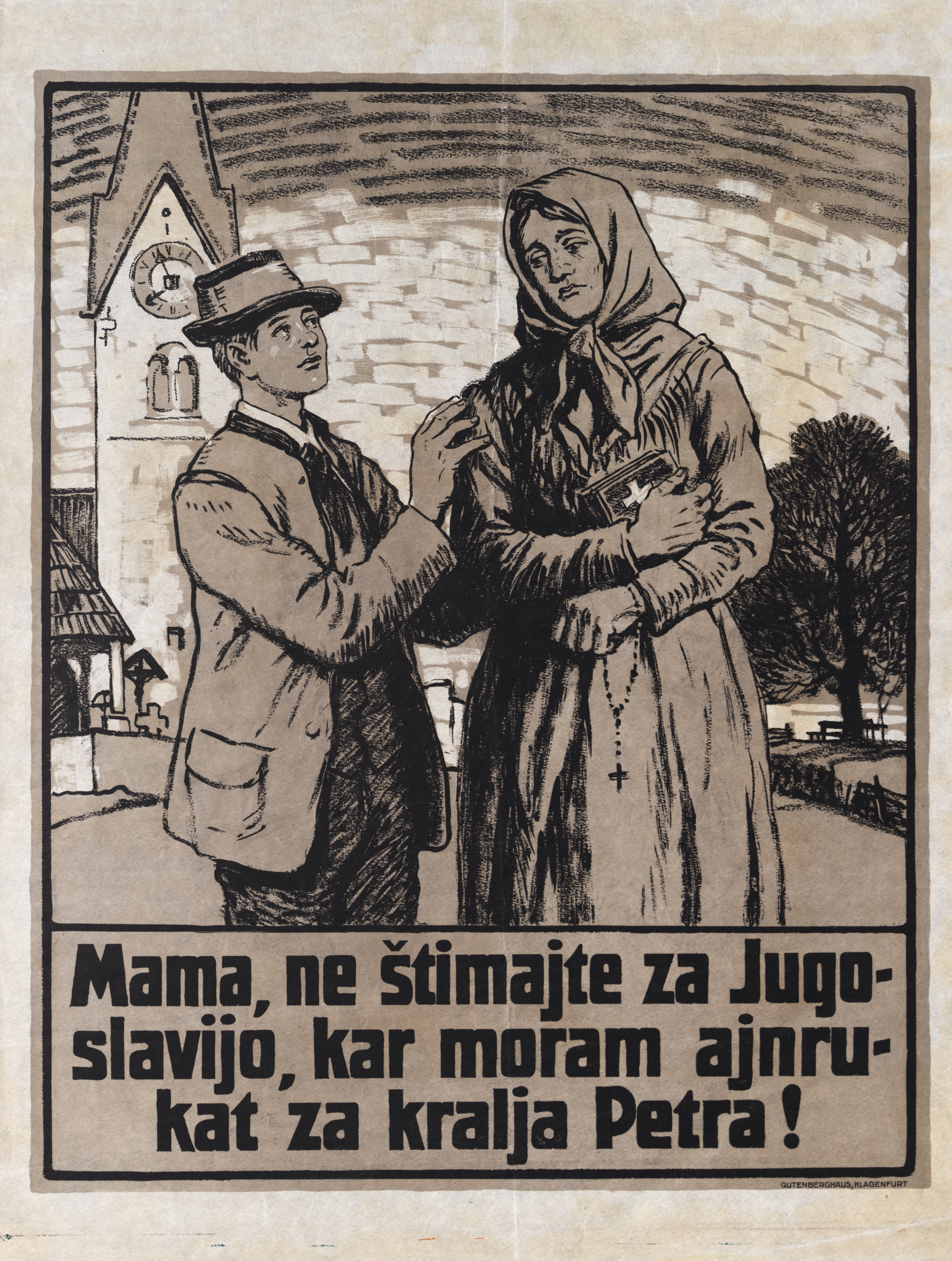
Austrian propaganda poster in Slovene from 1920. The text reads: "Mother, do not vote for Yugoslavia, or I will be drafted for King Peter". With such messages, the Austrian side depicted Yugoslavs as militaristic, and Austrians and Germans as peace-loving.

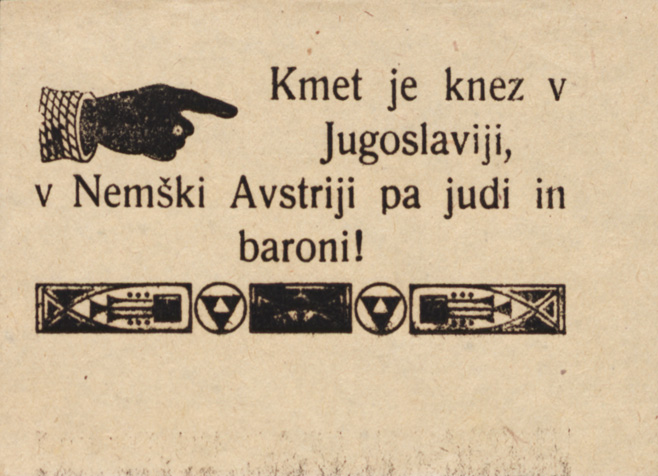
A Yugoslav propaganda sticker. The text reads: "In Yugoslavia, the farmer is the prince. In German Austria, the Jews and the barons are."

The Carinthian plebiscite (German: Kärntner Volksabstimmung, Slovene: Koroški plebiscit) was held on 10 October 1920 in the area in southern Carinthia predominantly settled by Carinthian Slovenes. It determined the final border between the Republic of Austria and the newly formed Kingdom of Serbs, Croats and Slovenes (Yugoslavia) after World War I. The predominantly Slovene-speaking plebiscite area voted to remain part of Austria with a 59% majority.

== Background ==
After the defeat of the multi-ethnic Austria-Hungary and the ruling Habsburg dynasty in World War I, new states arose in its former territory. Among these there was an internationally unrecognized State of Slovenes, Croats and Serbs, which was created in the final days of the war according to the 1917 Corfu Declaration, and merged with the Kingdom of Serbia to form the Kingdom of Serbs, Croats and Slovenes on December 1, 1918.

Determination of borders between the new countries was complex and difficult, and not always peaceful: While the northwestern border with the Kingdom of Italy along the "Julian March" was already determined by the 1915 Treaty of London, the demarcation line between Yugoslavia and the rump state of German-Austria was a difficult and highly disputed matter. The principle of self-determination, championed by U.S. President Woodrow Wilson, was taken up by both Slovenes and German-Austrians in the Carinthian, Styrian and Carniolan lands of the defunct Habsburg empire. The rising tensions culminated in clashes of arms, as on Marburg's Bloody Sunday in Lower Styria and the continued fighting of paramilitary groups in southeastern Carinthia.

In particular the "Carinthian question" had become an issue in the closing days of World War I, when events developed rapidly, beginning with territorial claims by the Slovenian National Assembly on October 17, 1918. These claims were rejected by the Carinthian provisional Landtag assembly on 25 October 1918, declaring the state's accession to German-Austria. From November 5, Yugoslav forces moved into the settlement area of the Carinthian Slovenes from the Karawanks mountain range down to the Drava River and beyond. The Landtag assembly fled from Klagenfurt to the northwestern town of Spittal an der Drau and on 11 November officially demanded self-determination, which in this case amounted to demanding a plebiscite for a region with a mixed population.

With the occupation of southeastern Carinthia by Yugoslav troops, the confrontation evolved into armed clashes. The provisional Carinthian government under Governor Arthur Lemisch decided to take up arms to preserve the southern Carinthian border on the Karawanks range. The bitter fighting of paramilitary groups around Arnoldstein and Ferlach alarmed the Entente powers. They arbitrated a ceasefire, whereafter a nine-day U.S. Army commission under Lt.Col. Sherman Miles scouted the disputed region in January and February 1919 and made the crucial recommendation that the Karawanks frontier should be retained, thus opening the possibility of a plebiscite. Yugoslav representatives urged for a border on the Drava; American delegates however spoke in favor of preserving the unity of the Klagenfurt Basin and convinced the British and French delegations. Until May 7, all occupied Carinthian territories were vacated. When Yugoslav forces under General Rudolf Maister made an attempt to re-enter the region on 28 May 1919, they were forced to withdraw by the Entente authorities.

The question was whether the considerable Slovene-speaking majority in the state's southeastern region, adjoining the Karawanks range, would carry the vote for union with Austria or whether that majority wished to join a newly created South Slavic state. This was to a large extent a consequence of rising romantic nationalism under the Austrian-Hungarian Monarchy and the idea of an autonomy of the "Slovene lands", referring to the early medieval Slavic principality of Carantania, which had perished in the ninth century. A common state with other South Slavic peoples seemed the most acceptable compromise toward fulfillment of nationalist strivings.

== Plebiscite ==
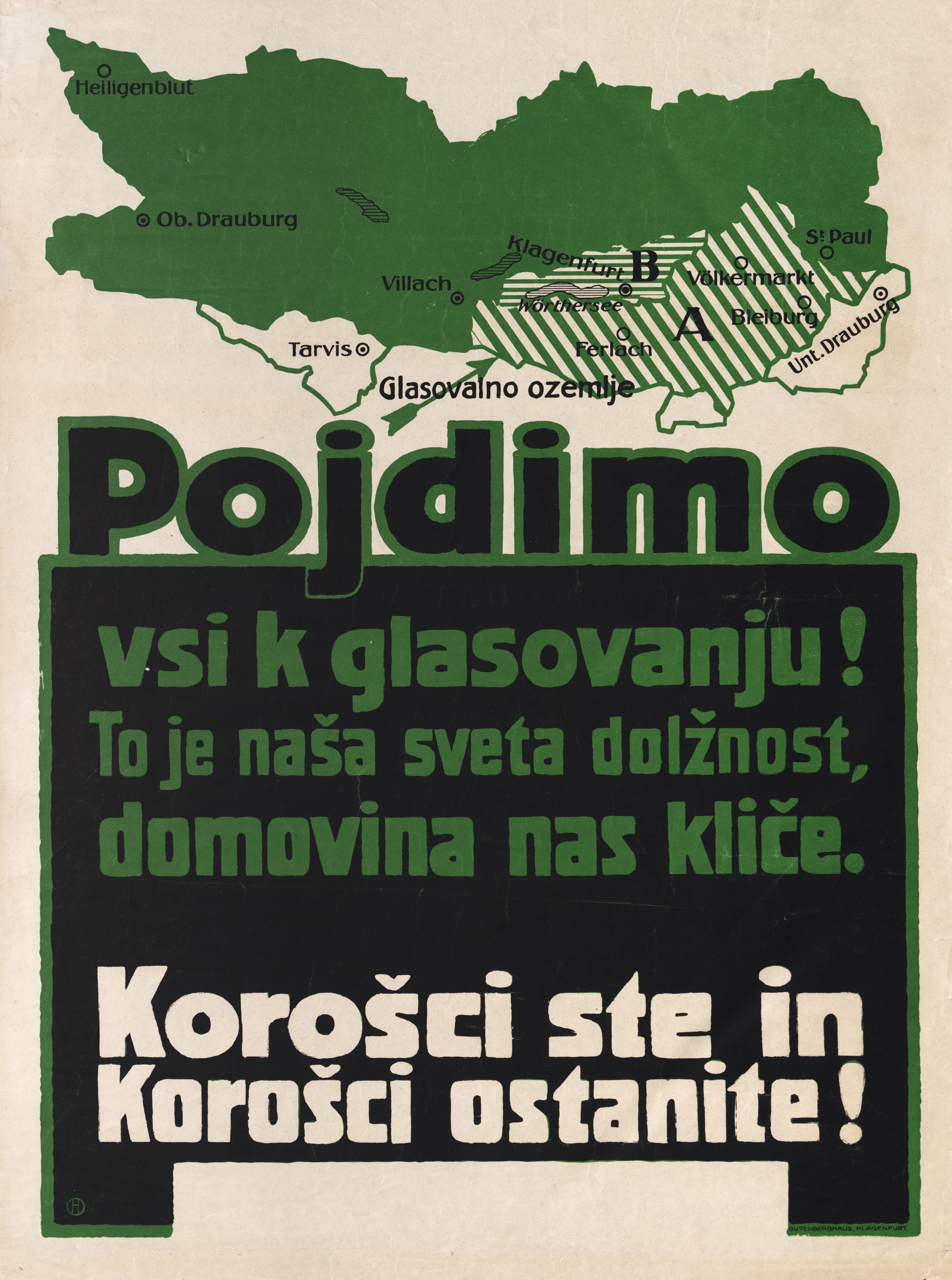
Poster in Slovene ("Let us go and vote! It is our sacred duty, our homeland is calling us. You are Carinthians, and you should remain Carinthians!"), featuring zones A and B

The Treaty of Saint-Germain with the Republic of Austria, signed on 10 September 1919, should have determined the Austrian-Yugoslav border. It ascertained that some small parts of Carinthia—i.e. the Meža Valley (German: Mießtal) with the town of Dravograd (Unterdrauburg) and the Jezersko (Seeland) municipal area—should be incorporated into the new Kingdom of Serbs, Croats and Slovenes, while the fate of wider southeastern Carinthia area down to the Klagenfurt basin was to be determined by a plebiscite.

Wanting to resolve the conflict peacefully, the Allied victors in World War I divided southeastern Carinthia into two zones, "A" in the south and "B" in the north. A two-stage referendum was to be held to determine annexation by either Austria or the Kingdom of Serbs, Croats and Slovenes, in the smaller Zone B only if a majority of the people in Zone A had voted for Yugoslavia. The population of Zone A was predominantly Slovene-speaking: according to the pre-war Austrian census of 1910, people in these municipalities who used Slovene as their primary language represented nearly 70% of the population; while the number of ethnic Slovenes was probably higher. German speakers were concentrated in the town of Völkermarkt and certain smaller localities, especially around Bleiburg (Slovene: Pliberk) and Ferlach (Borovlje).

Before the plebiscite, both sides waged intensive propaganda campaigns. Austrian propaganda emphasized the economic benefits of maintaining the unity of the Klagenfurt Basin and appealed to feelings of Carinthian unity and brotherhood between the Slovene- and German-speaking peoples of Carinthia. Conducted in the Slovene Carinthian dialect, Austrian propaganda promised that the Slovene language and national identity would be treated as equal to the German in Austria, officially confirmed by the Carinthia Landtag assembly two weeks before the plebiscite was held. It nevertheless also had an anti-Yugoslav tendency, picturing the conditions in the Kingdom of Serbs, Croats, and Slovenes as chaotic. Yugoslav propaganda almost exclusively used arguments emphasizing Slovene national awareness. It took an aggressive anti-German view from the beginning and turned to economic issues only in the last few weeks before the plebiscite. The campaigners were not capable of using the political instability of the young Austrian republic and its then unenviable position in the international community for advantage.

Despite the six-months term determined by the Treaty of Saint-Germain, the referendum was not held in Zone A until October 10, 1920. In addition to changing the date of the plebiscite, other terms of the Treaty of Saint-Germain allegedly were ignored or changed: an Austrian representative was accepted into the commission, and the plebiscite commission changed rules by not allowing the Yugoslav military to control the border between Zones A and B on 8 June 1920. Instead the Yugoslav army had to withdraw from Zone A in accord with the decision of the plebiscite commission on 18 September 1920. Changes may also have been made in electoral registers which allowed people from northern Zone B voting in Zone A, backing the Austrian side. In the following decades both sides would continue to interpret and instrumentalize the plebiscite's circumstances in their own way.

== Results ==
The outcome of the plebiscite held on 10 October, was 22,025 votes (59.1% of the total cast) in favor of adhesion to Austria and 15,279 (40.9%) in favor of annexation by the Kingdom of the Serbs, Croats, and Slovenes. Assuming that the whole German-speaking minority had voted for Austria, half of all Carinthian Slovenes had also decided to remain with the Republic. While a majority in the remote Alpine villages on the slopes of the Karawanks range voted for Yugoslavia, the inhabitants of the densely settled Klagenfurt Basin were motivated by their evolved social and cultural, not least economic ties to the central Carinthian region.

Results by municipality For Austria For Yugoslavia

Votes in "Zone A" constituencies
	for Austria	for Yugoslavia
Rosegg	1,980	2,318
Ferlach	6,427	4,981
Völkermarkt	8,306	2,444
Bleiburg	5,312	5,535
Total	22,025	15,278

After the Austrian option had gained a majority of votes in predominantly Slovene Zone A, the second stage of the referendum in northern Zone B, populated chiefly by German speakers, was not carried out. Another Yugoslav foray was fiercely rejected by the Entente powers. The Carinthian Plebiscite region was placed under Austrian administration on 18 November 1920 and declared part of the sovereign Austrian Republic on November 22. Up to today, October 10 is a public holiday in the State of Carinthia.

The plebiscite ultimately determined the border between Austria and the Kingdom of Serbs, Croats, and Slovenes. The border remained unchanged after World War II, even as the Kingdom of Yugoslavia gave way to Tito's Federal People's Republic of Yugoslavia, though at the end of the war Yugoslav Partisans again briefly occupied the area, including the capital city of Klagenfurt. Since the disintegration of Yugoslavia, the border has separated Austria and Slovenia.

== Yugoslav occupation ==
The Yugoslav government in Belgrade initially declared victory in the plebiscite. After it became clear that the residents had voted in favour of Austria, Yugoslavia moved troops into the zone and occupied several towns; the military commanders stated that they did not recognize the authority of the plebiscite commission. At the same time, it was reported that there were riots, looting of shops, and beatings of ethnic Germans in nearby Maribor, which had a large German population but had been awarded to Yugoslavia in 1919. In late October, the Yugoslav government agreed to honour the outcome of the plebiscite and withdraw its troops from the zone.

=== Libeliče ===
The residents of Libeliče (German: Leifling), the easternmost village of Zone A, were pro-Yugoslav and helped organise pro-Yugoslav rallies throughout Zone A prior to the plebiscite. On the day of the plebiscite, a large majority of the village voted for Yugoslavia; however, along with the rest of Zone A it was placed under Austrian administration. The people of the village were unwilling to accept the outcome. On a daily basis, the barbed wire on the border was cut and boundary stones were removed. Regular rallies in the village and its surroundings encouraged increasingly more people to join the rebellion, deliberately ignoring any Austrian law passed after the plebiscite. The coordinators of the rebellion managed to establish contact with high-ranking politicians in Ljubljana and later also in Belgrade. Finally, the governments of Austria and Yugoslavia managed to agree on a territorial exchange: Austria ceded to Yugoslavia the territory of Libeliče and received in compensation an equally sized area on the left bank of the Drava, consisting of the predominantly German-speaking settlements of Rabenstein (Slovene: Rabštajn pri Labotu) and Lorenzenberg (Slovene: Šentlovrenc), which are today cadastral communities within the market town of Lavamünd. The handover of the territories took place on October 1, 1922. This was the final demarcation between Austria and Yugoslavia (and its current legal successor, Slovenia), still effective as of today.
