= Pavlič Pass =

Mountain pass between Austria and Slovenia

- Location within Alps
- Elevation: 1,338 metres (4,390 ft)
- Traversed by: road

Third Approach
- Location: Austria–Slovenia border
- Range: Kamnik–Savinja Alps
- Coordinates: 46°25′N 14°35′E

The Pavlič Pass, Paulitsch Pass or Paulitsch Saddle (Slovene: Pavličevo sedlo, German: Paulitschsattel) or just Pavlič (German: Paulitsch) (elevation 1,338 metres [4,390 ft]) is a mountain pass that connects the Slovenian municipality of Solčava in the historical region of Lower Styria with the Austrian state of Carinthia.

The Seeberg highway (B 82) runs from the Austrian side through the scenic village of Bad Eisenkappel (Slovene: Železna Kapla) up to the border crossing Seebergsattel. Nine kilometres after Bad Eisenkappel, a road to Paulitschsattel bears left off the B 82. A short descent is followed by a very steep 6 kilometres (3.7 mi) climb and then 1 kilometre (0.62 mi) of undulating road to the pass and border crossing. On the Slovenian side, the ascent starts at the beginning of the scenic Logar Valley and is 7 kilometres (4.3 mi) long.

== See also ==
- List of highest paved roads in Europe
- List of mountain passes

== See also ==
- Styria
- Carinthia (province)
