= Vinko Ošlak =

Slovene author, essayist, translator, columnist and esperantist

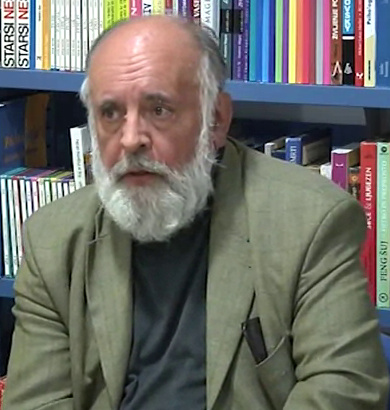
Vinko Ošlak

Vinko Ošlak (born 23 June 1947) is a Slovene author, essayist, translator, columnist and esperantist from the Austrian state of Carinthia.

Ošlak was born in the town of Slovenj Gradec, then part of the Socialist Republic of Slovenia in former Yugoslavia. After completing his primary and high school education in his native province of Slovenian Carinthia, he enrolled at the University of Ljubljana, where he studied political science. Due to economic problems, he quit the studies and dedicated himself to journalism. A devout Roman Catholic, he became active in the Slovenian Christian intellectual subculture around the alternative journal Revija 2000 ("Review 2000"). Among others, he became a close friend of the Slovenian Christian Socialist poet and dissident Edvard Kocbek, who strongly influenced Ošlak's spiritual and intellectual development.

Due to his critical attitude towards the Titoist regime, Ošlak was unable to get a job as journalist, and worked as a manual worker. In 1983, after pettifoggery by the Yugoslav secret police, Ošlak decided to move to Austria. He settled in Klagenfurt, Carinthia, and became involved in the cultural activities of the Carinthian Slovene minority. He enrolled at the Akademio Internacia de la Sciencoj in San Marino, where he graduated from philosophy in 1991 with a thesis on Novalis' state philosophy. Two years later, he obtained an MA at the same institution with a thesis entitled "Identity and Communication in the Case of the Slovene Minority in Carinthia".

Ošlak has written several books of essays in Slovene, German and Esperanto. He also writes columns in several Slovenian and Austrian journals. In 2003, he received the Rožanc Award, the highest award for essayism in Slovenia.

From 1989 to 2006, Ošlak worked as an official at the Slovene section of the Catholic Action for the Roman Catholic Diocese of Gurk. During this time, he appeared in public as a Catholic intellectual. In 2006, however, he left the Roman Catholic Church and joined the Evangelical community. He especially criticised the political involvement of the Roman Catholic Church and its lack of commitment to the Christian eschatology.

Since 2004, Ošlak has served as the chairman of the Esperantist centre of the International P.E.N.
