= Cvetka Lipuš =

Austrian poet writing in Slovenian (born 1966)

Cvetka Lipuš (born 1966) is an Austrian poet writing in Slovenian.

She was born in Bad Eisenkappel in the Austrian state of Carinthia and is the daughter of the Carinthian Slovenian author Florjan Lipuš. She attended the high school for Slovenes in Klagenfurt. She studied comparative literature and Slavic studies at the University of Vienna and University of Klagenfurt. She lived in the United States from the early 1990s to 2009 and studied library and information sciences at the University of Pittsburgh, Pennsylvania. She moved to Salzburg, Austria, in 2009.

She began writing poems while still in her teens and edited her first anthology, a collection of Slovene poetry, V lunini senci (In the Shadow of the Moon), in collaboration with Fabjan Hafner in 1985. Four years later Pragovi dneva (Thresholds of the Day) was published, which was followed by Doba temnjenja (Times of Darkness) in 1993. Her fourth volume of poems, Geografija bližine (Geography of Closeness), appeared in 2000. In 2003, she published Spregatev milosti (Conjugating Mercy). This was followed by Obleganje sreče (Siege of Happiness, 2008), Pojdimo vezat kosti (Let's Go Tie Up Some Bones, 2010), and Kaj smo, ko smo (What We Are When We Are, 2015) the English translation of which was nominated for the Canadian Robert Kroetsch Award for Poetry 2019.

Lipuš has received numerous prizes, and her poems have been translated into several other languages, including English, German, and Bulgarian.

== See also ==
- List of Austrian writers
