= Bad Eisenkappel =

Austrian municipality

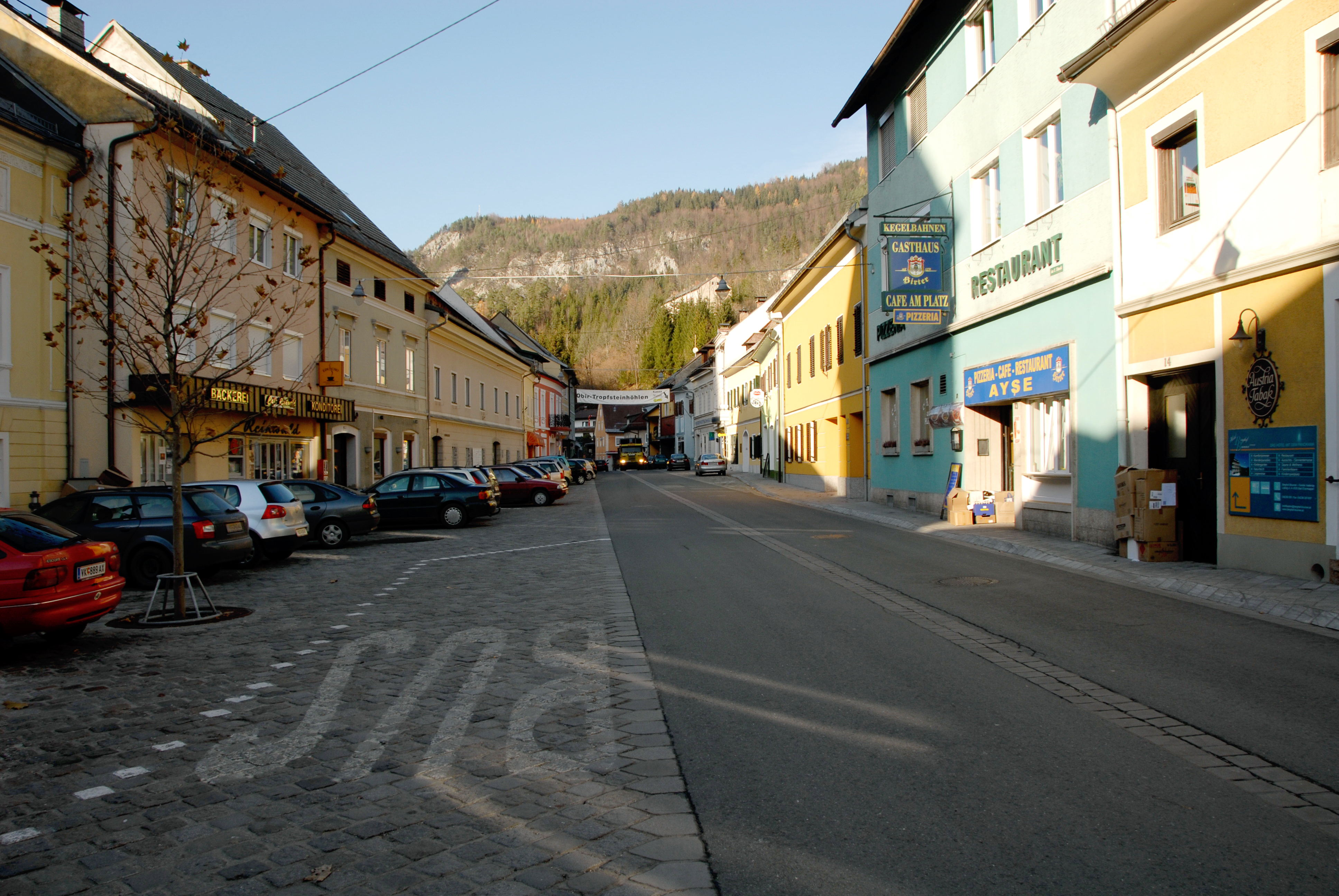
- Eisenkappel main square
- Interactive map of Bad Eisenkappel
- Coordinates: 46°29′N 14°36′E
- Country: Austria
- State: Carinthia
- District: Völkermarkt

Bad Eisenkappel, also known as Eisenkappel (Slovene: Železna Kapla), is a municipality located in the Vellach Valley in the Karawanken mountain range with the nearby peaks: Obir, Peca, and Olševa. It is the population center of the market township of Eisenkappel-Vellach (population 2,446) of the Völkermarkt district in the State of Carinthia, Austria near the border of Slovenia.

Bad Eisenkappel was first referred to by the name Kappel in 1267. It was officially renamed in 1890 to Eisenkappel.

The area is known for its hiking and cycling trails, as well as for the extensive Obir cave system, which has been mined for lead ore since at least 1171, and has been open to the public since 1991. Frommers says "Eisenkappel is the major stopover in the Vellach Valley. This town is surrounded by centuries-old forests and mineral springs, and because of its position as a frontier town only 15km (10 miles) from the Austro-Slovenian border's Jezersko Pass, it also offers many cultural and historical attractions. ... There are many sky-blue lakes and white mountain peaks near Eisenkappel. Lake Klopeiner ..., to the north of this town, is the warmest lake in Carinthia and 8km (5 miles) to the southwest you'll see Trögerner Gorge."

The International Commission for the Protection of the Alps (CIPRA) has stated that Bad Eisenkappel is highly affected by a growing trend of "out migration" where services and basic infrastructure are leaving the area. As such the town has attempted to counterbalance this loss by starting events to keep the youth within. Currently, as noted in the report, much of the youth travel to nearby Klagenfurt. Its sister community is Jezersko across the Austria-Slovenia border.

== Notable residents ==
- Cvetka Lipuš, poet
- Maja Haderlap, writer
- Florjan Lipuš, writer and Prešeren laureate
- Angela Piskernik, botanist and head of the Museum of Natural History, Ljubljana
- de:Gerald Florian Messner Gerald Florian Messner, Musicologist

== See also ==
- Seeberg Saddle
- Paulitsch Saddle
