= Utraquist school =

Term for bilingual schools in some countries

An utraquist school or utraquist gymnasium is a term for bilingual education in some countries, in which the subjects were taught both in a state language and in the language of some ethnic minority. The term "utraquist" here is in an analogy with the Catholic concept of utraquism (from Latin: uterque, utraque, "both"/"each (of the two)").

Such schools existed, e.g., in Poland, in areas dominated by Ukrainians and Belarusians ("Kresy Wschodnie"), and in Austria-Hungary/Austria of 19th and early 20th centuries, in the areas of numerous ethnic minorities. In both cases, these types of schools were considered to be instrumented of ethnic assimilation (Polonization and Germanisation respectively.) In Poland, some other utraquist schools taught in Polish and Yiddish languages.

An account traced the root of the utraquist school to the concept called revelatio, which denotes an insight drawn from ancient authorities and texts. The church was one of the earliest institutions to practice it. The use of the utraquist model, however, declined for several decades due to the policies that ban compulsory second language use in the classroom.

The concept was reintroduced in a different form, the Content and Language Integrated Learning or CLIL. Bilingual schools are promoted in the European Union education policy, particularly for secondary education.
