= Milka Hartman =

Slovenian poet

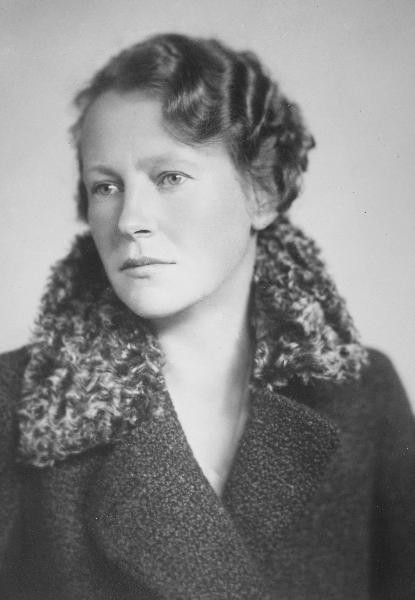
Milka Hartman in the 1930s

Milka Hartman (11 February 1902 – 9 June 1997) was a Slovenian poet.

She worked as a teacher for home economics in Slovenia and Carinthia.

A number of her poems have been set to music by herself and others.
