= Florjan Lipuš =

Slovenian writer

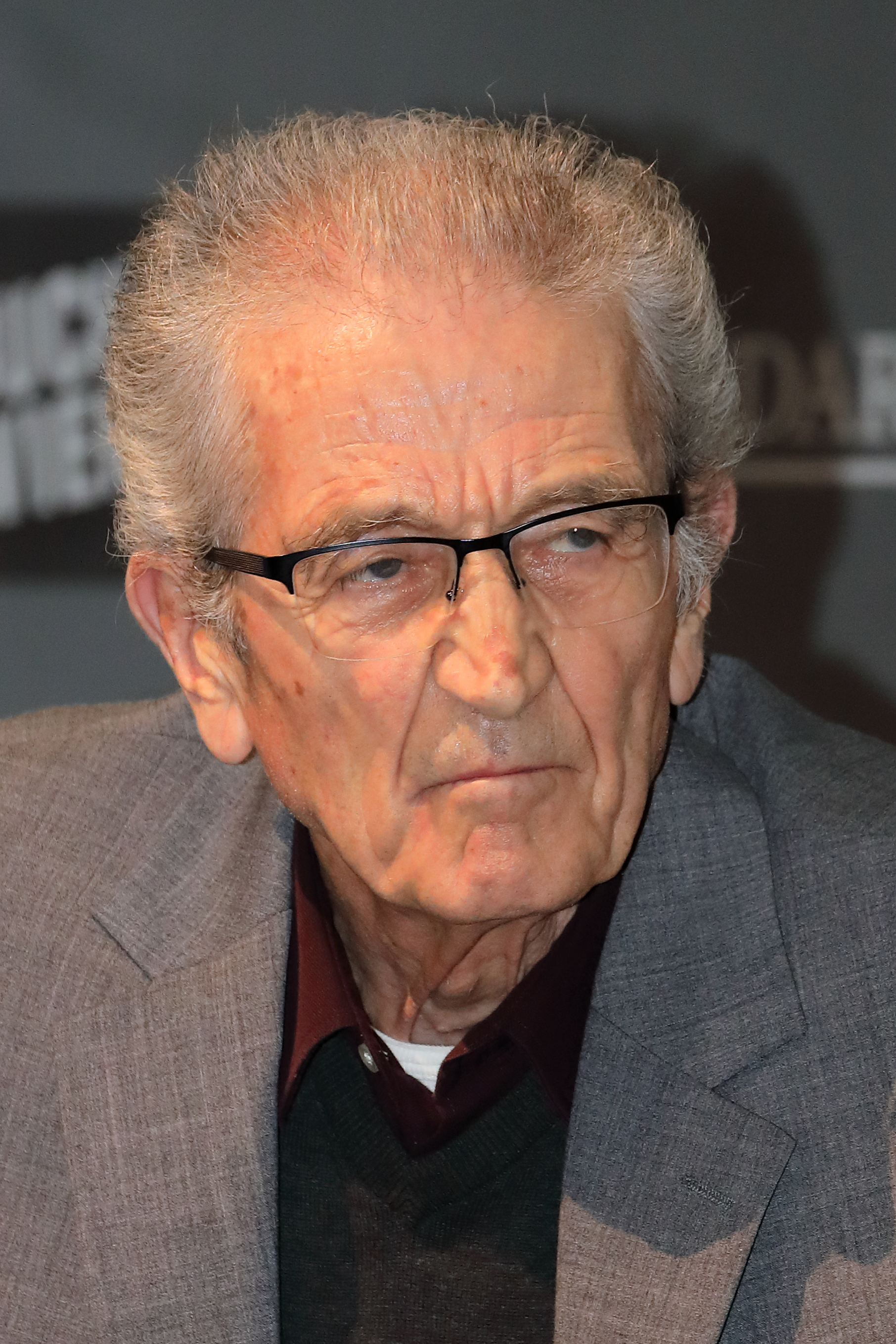
- Born: 4 May 1937 (age 89); Lobnig, Austria
- Occupation: writer
- Writing career
- Pen name: Boro Kostanek
- Notable awards: Prešeren Award; 2004; Grand Austrian State Prize; 2018

Florjan Lipuš (born 4 May 1937) is a Carinthian Slovene writer and translator. Since 1985 he has been a corresponding member of the Slovenian Academy of Sciences and Arts.

== Awards ==
- 2004: Prešeren Award
- 2011: Petrarca-Preis
- 2013: Franz Nabl Prize
- 2018: Grand Austrian State Prize
- 2022: Honorary Doctor, University of Klagenfurt
- 2022: Grand Decoration of Honour in Gold, state of Carinthia
