= Seeberg Saddle =

- Seebergsattel, Jezerski vrh
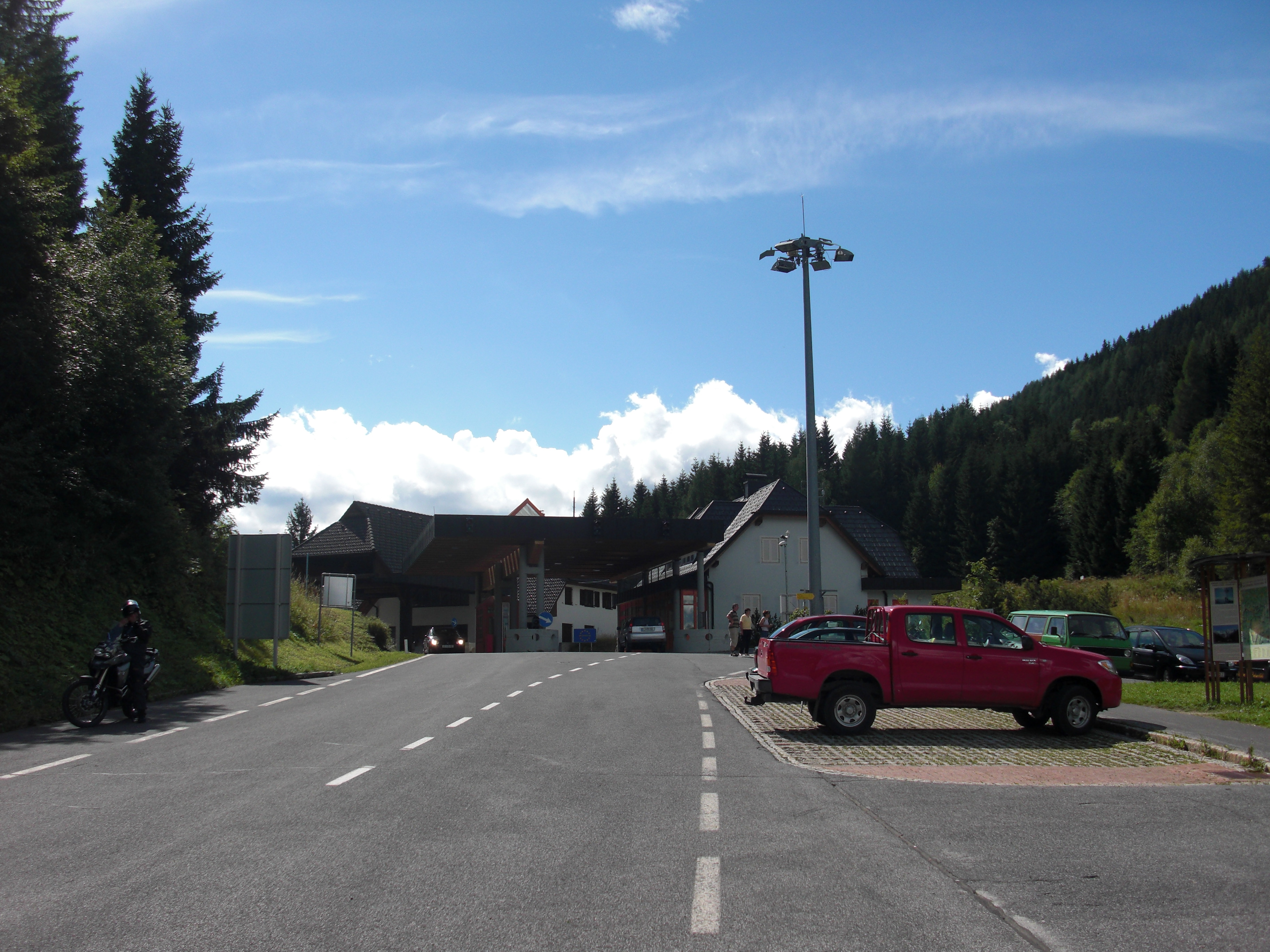
- Border crossing at the summit (from Austrian side)

- Location within Alps
- Elevation: 1,218 metres (3,996 ft)
- Traversed by: Seeberg Highway B 82

Third Approach
- Location: Austria–Slovenia border
- Range: Karawanks, Kamnik–Savinja Alps
- Coordinates: 46°25′N 14°31′E

Seeberg Saddle (German: Seebergsattel, Slovene: Jezerski vrh), also just Seeberg (Jezersko) is a high mountain pass connecting Bad Eisenkappel in the Austrian state of Carinthia with Jezersko in the Slovenian region of Carinthia. It is located in the Southern Limestone Alps, between the Karawanks range in the west and the Kamnik–Savinja Alps in the east.

The road across the pass is probably of Roman origin, leading from the Drava valley in the Noricum province towards the city of Aquileia. The border at the summit was implemented after the dissolution of Austria-Hungary by the 1919 Treaty of Saint-Germain. Today the Seeberg Highway (B 82) heads from the Austrian side up to the border crossing on the pass. Directly behind the Slovenian border station is an inn. On the Slovenian side, the state road No. 210 descends from the Seeberg down to Jezersko, offering a panoramic view of the Kamnik Alps.

Seeberg Saddle is also known as the Carinthian Seeberg to distinguish it from the Styrian Seeberg Pass in the Northern Limestone Alps.

== See also ==
- List of highest paved roads in Europe
- List of mountain passes
