= Unity List (Austria) =

Unity List Enotna Lista Einheitsliste
- Slovene name: Enotna lista
- Leader: Gabriel Hribar
- Founded: 1973
- Preceded by: Party of the Carinthian Slovenes (not legal predecessor)
- Headquarters: Viktringer Ring 26, 9020 Klagenfurt
- Ideology: Slovene minority politics Regionalism
- European affiliation: European Free Alliance
- Colours: Purple
- Landtag of Carinthia: 0 / 36
- National Council: 0 / 183
- Federal Council: 0 / 60
- European Parliament: 0 / 20

Website
- enotnalista.at

The Unity List (Slovene: Enotna lista, German: Einheitsliste) or EL seeks to represent the indigenous Slovene minority in Carinthia. It came into existence in 1991, replacing the "Club of Slovenian Local Councillors" (Slovene: Klub slovenskih občinskih svetnikov, German: Klub der slowenischen Gemeinderäte), which had existed as an initiative of local Slovenian party lists from various local councils. Slovenian party lists have regularly contested elections in Carinthia since 1950. The current leader of the party is Gabriel Hribar.

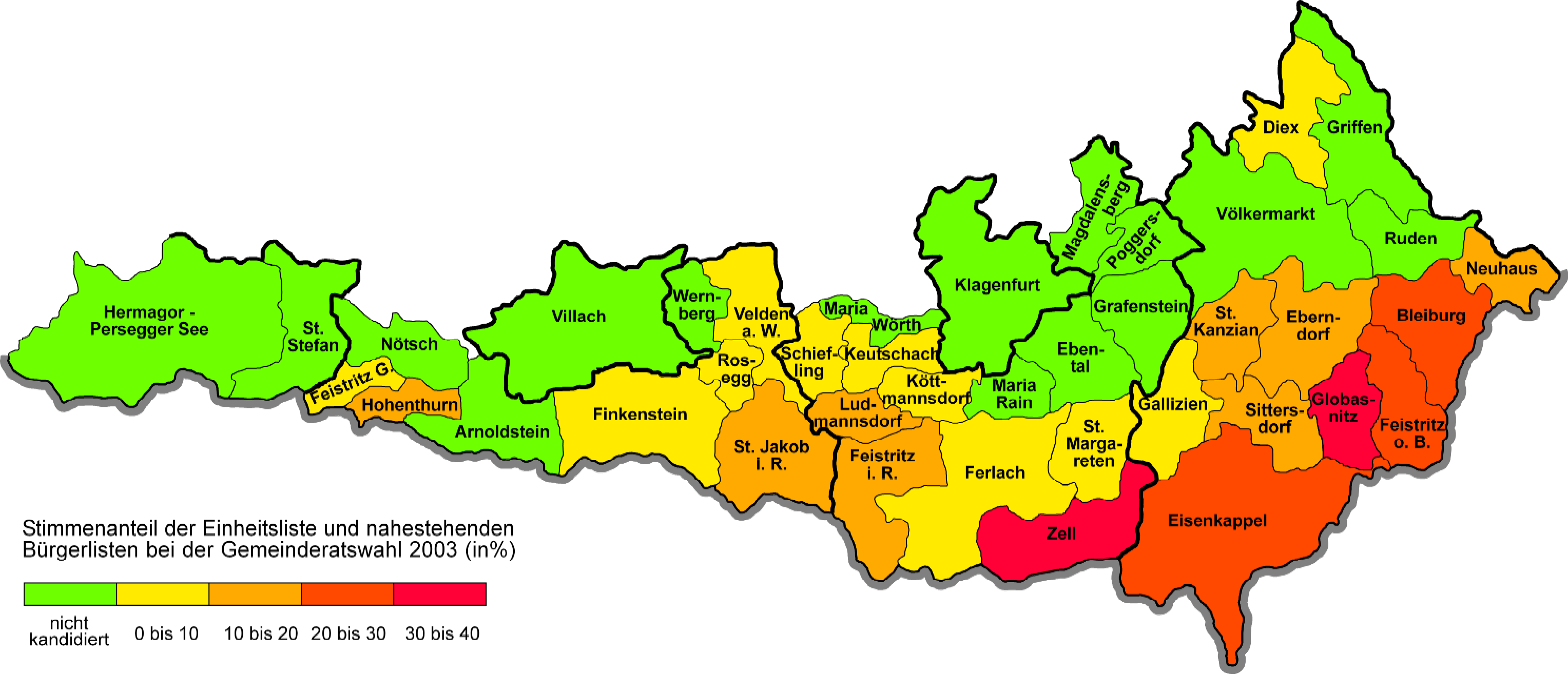
Local council election results for the Enotna lista in southern Carinthia in 2003

Since the percentage of Slovenians in Carinthia is below the election threshold in the Carinthian Parliament (10%), the EL cannot represent the Carinthian Slovenes in the Carinthian or Austrian Parliament. In 1975 the EL missed a mandate in the Carinthian parliament by a few hundred votes (the vote tally then, of 6130, is the highest the party ever got after World War II). In 1979, however, Carinthia was split up in four electoral districts, making it impossible for the EL to pass the threshold on its own, without making any electoral alliance. Therefore, on both Land and national levels, the EL has tended to participate in electoral unions (sometimes with the Greens, sometimes with the Liberal Forum). The party is full member of the European Free Alliance.

The party is represented on its own on the local level. Following the 2021 Carinthian local elections, 29 municipal councillors across Carinthia are part of EL.

== See also ==
- Slovene Union
