= Mežica Mine =

Mine in Mežica, Slovenia

Coordinates: 46.5120°N 14.8574°E

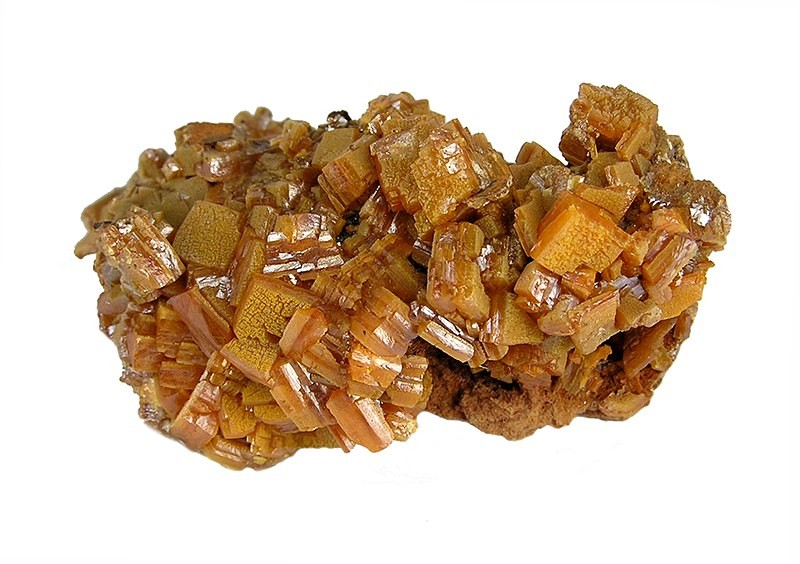
Rare mineral wulfenite from the Mežica mine

The Mežica Lead and Zinc Mine (Slovene: Rudnik svinca in cinka Mežica or shortly rudnik Mežica) is one of the oldest mines in Europe, with its first documented mentions dating back to 1665. Located in the Mežica Valley in Slovenia, it played a significant role in the Slovenian mining history.

== History ==
The mining activities in the Mežica area can be traced back to ancient times when the Romans first discovered ore deposits in the region. However, it was not until the 15th century that lead extraction began to gain prominence. The earliest written record of lead mining in Slovenian Carinthia, probably beneath Mount Peca, dates back to 1424 when it was documented in the account book of Duke Ernest the Iron.

In 1620, a blacksmith and miner named Melhior Puc from the Lavamünd Valley settled in Črna and transferred his mining concessions for two smelting furnaces to the region. In 1624, the smelters were sold to Count H. L. Thurn from Bleiburg. In 1665, the first official permit for mining operations was issued, marking the formal establishment of the Mežica Lead and Zinc Mine. Over the next several centuries, the mine experienced periods of expansion and development, as well as temporary interruptions due to various factors.

During the 19th century, particularly after the Mežica mine came under the rule of Napoleon's Illyrian Provinces in 1809, significant advancements in mining techniques and operations were introduced. The mining company Brunner-Kompoš revolutionised the industry by implementing modern technologies, resulting in increased production and efficiency.

In 1871, the Bleiberger Bergwerks Union (BBU) company was founded and in 1889 took over all mining operations in the Mežica area. The company's focus shifted to ore processing in the nearby town of Žerjav after 1896. By the early 20th century, the Mežica mine had become a prominent producer of lead, with its production accounting for approximately 1% of the world's total lead output after World War I.

Between 1898 and 1965, ten power plants were built, with only the two largest still operating underground. In 1907, with the merger of hydroelectric power plants in Žerjav, Podpeca, and Polena, the first parallel-operating power plant system was established in Slovenia. From 1917 to 1934, the mine also had its own narrow-gauge railway stretching 13 km from Prevalje to Žerjav. In 1921, the English company The Central European Mines Limited Mežica acquired the mine, bringing further advancements and investments. After World War II, the mine was nationalised. However, with the depletion of the ore reserves, mining activities ceased in 1994. The lead smelter and battery factory associated with the mine transitioned to importing lead instead.

== Tourism ==
Today, the Mežica Lead and Zinc Mine has been transformed into a museum and offers various tourism attractions. Some of the notable features and activities include:

1. Mine tour: Visitors can embark on guided tours that provide insights into the historical mining methods employed at the Mežica mine. The tour includes a visit to the Glančnik tunnel, spanning approximately 3.5 kilometers, where mining equipment used throughout different periods is showcased. From there, visitors can board a mining train that takes them to the Moring section of the mine, followed by a 1.5-kilometer walking trail to a higher level.

2. Underground cycling: An exciting adventure awaits cyclists as they navigate through the abandoned mine tunnels under the guidance of experienced tour guides. Equipped with headlamps, participants can explore over five kilometers of underground cycling paths, connecting different valleys in the region. The cycling route begins at Igrčevo, near Črna na Koroškem, and concludes at Breg near Mežica.
