= Ludranski Vrh =

- Location in Slovenia
- Coordinates: 46°26′2.88″N 14°51′50.49″E
- Country: Slovenia
- Traditional region: Carinthia
- Statistical region: Carintha
- Municipality: Črna na Koroškem

Area
  - Total: 18.92 km^{2} (7.31 sq mi)
- Elevation: 1,039.2 m (3,409 ft)

Population (2020)
  - Total: 92
  - Density: 4.9/km^{2} (13/sq mi)

Ludranski Vrh (pronounced [ˈluːdɾanski ˈʋəɾx]) is a dispersed settlement in the hills south of Črna na Koroškem in the Carinthia region in northern Slovenia.

== Name ==
The name Ludranski Vrh is believed to be a corruption of Luteranski Vrh (literally, 'Lutheran Peak'). In the past, there were many Lutherans living in the area around Črna na Koroškem.

== Landmarks ==
=== Najevnik lime tree ===
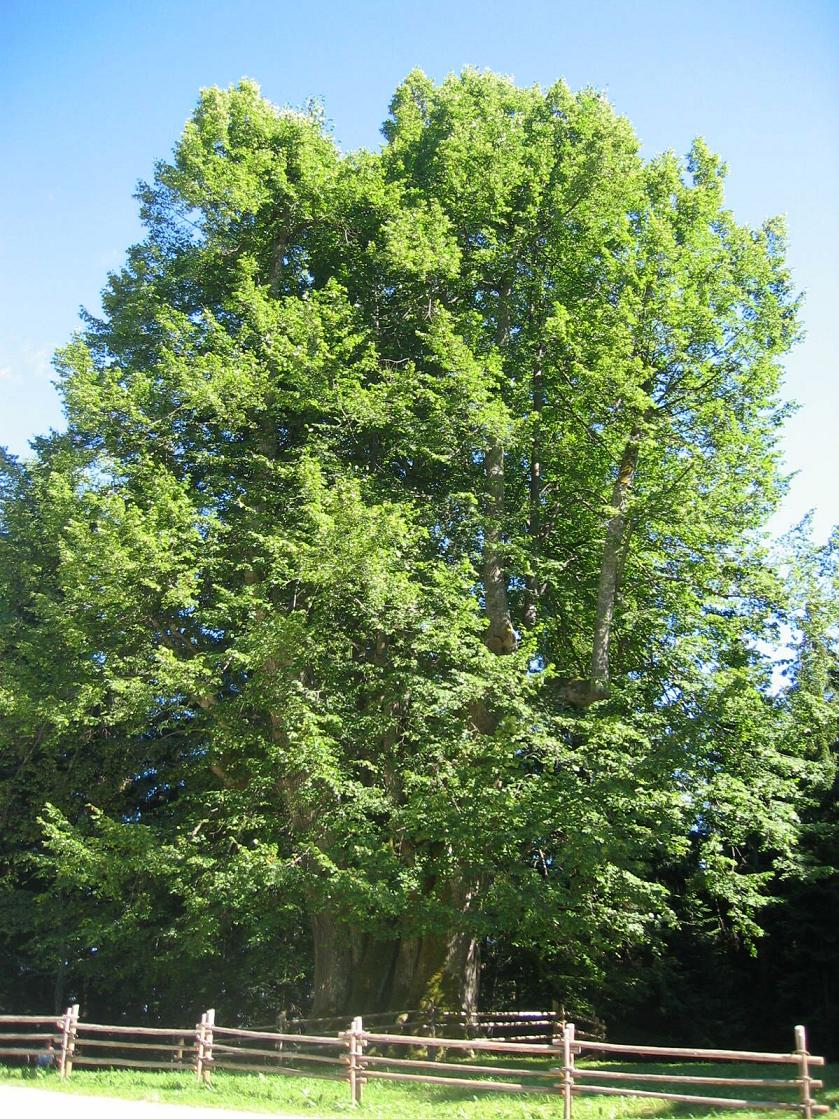
Najevnik lime tree

The Najevnik lime tree (Slovene: Najevska lipa, Najevnikov lipovec) in Ludranski Vrh, a small-leaved lime (Tilia cordata) specimen approximately 700 years old, has the largest trunk circumference of any tree in Slovenia (10.70 meters; its height is 24 m). The tree is named after the Najevnik Farm. It is a prominent veteran tree, which probably germinated around the time of the Ottoman invasions of Europe, around the time of the reign of King Matjaž. It is a place of cultural events, and every July or June a national meeting of Slovene politicians takes place under it.

== See also ==
- List of individual trees
