= 1478 =

1478 in various calendars
- Gregorian calendar: 1478; MCDLXXVIII
- Ab urbe condita: 2231
- Armenian calendar: 927; ԹՎ ՋԻԷ
- Assyrian calendar: 6228
- Balinese saka calendar: 1399–1400
- Bengali calendar: 884–885
- Berber calendar: 2428
- English Regnal year: 17 Edw. 4 – 18 Edw. 4
- Buddhist calendar: 2022
- Burmese calendar: 840
- Byzantine calendar: 6986–6987
- Chinese calendar: 丁酉年 (Fire Rooster); 4175 or 3968 — to — 戊戌年 (Earth Dog); 4176 or 3969
- Coptic calendar: 1194–1195
- Discordian calendar: 2644
- Ethiopian calendar: 1470–1471
- Hebrew calendar: 5238–5239
- Hindu calendars
- Vikram Samvat: 1534–1535
- Shaka Samvat: 1399–1400
- Kali Yuga: 4578–4579
- Holocene calendar: 11478
- Igbo calendar: 478–479
- Iranian calendar: 856–857
- Islamic calendar: 882–883
- Japanese calendar: Bunmei 10 (文明１０年)
- Javanese calendar: 1394–1395
- Julian calendar: 1478; MCDLXXVIII
- Korean calendar: 3811
- Minguo calendar: 434 before ROC 民前434年
- Nanakshahi calendar: 10
- Thai solar calendar: 2020–2021
- Tibetan calendar: མེ་མོ་བྱ་ལོ་ (female Fire-Bird); 1604 or 1223 or 451 — to — ས་ཕོ་ཁྱི་ལོ་ (male Earth-Dog); 1605 or 1224 or 452

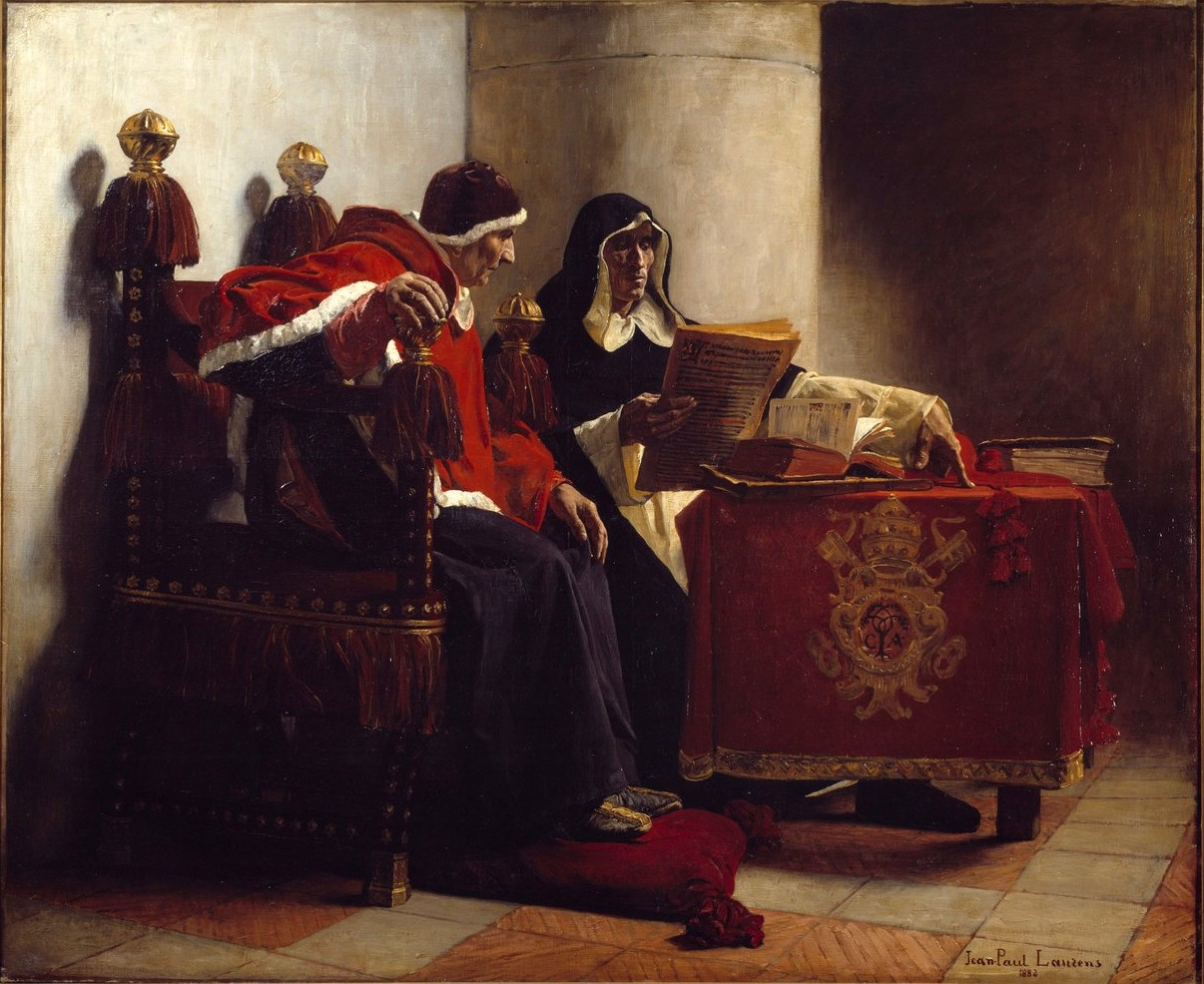
November 1: Pope Sixtus IV issues a papal bull authorizing Tomas de Torquemada to carry out the Spanish Inquisition.

Year 1478 (MCDLXXVIII) was a common year starting on Thursday of the Julian calendar.

== Events ==
=== January–March ===
- January 6 – At Tabriz, Khalil Mirza is proclaimed the Sultan of Aq Qoyunlu (now in Iran) after the death of his father, Uzun Hasan. Khalil is overthrown by his brother Ya'qub in July.
- January 15 –
  - After a three month rebellion that began on October 9, Novgorod surrenders to Ivan III, Grand Prince of Moscow, bringing an end to the separate existence (under Ivan) of the Novgorod Republic. The annexation of Novgorod becomes the beginning of the transition of the principality of Moscow to the Russian Empire.

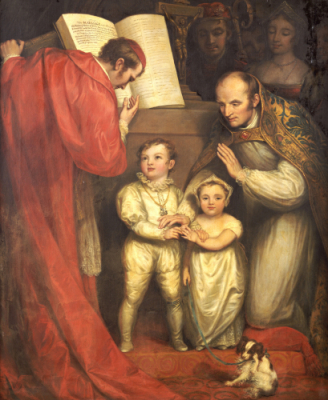
An 1850 representation of the wedding of Richard and Anne

  - The wedding of Richard of Shrewsbury, Duke of York, the 4-year-old son of King Edward IV of England to Anne de Mowbray, the 5-year-old daughter of the Count of Norfolk, takes place in England.
- February 18 – George Plantagenet, Duke of Clarence, convicted of treason against his older brother King Edward IV of England, is privately executed in the Tower of London.
- March 28 – The initial draft of the Treaty of Brno, between the Kingdom of Hungary and the Kingdom of Bohemia, is agreed upon by envoys from both kingdoms, subject to modifications.

=== April–June ===
- April 26 – On Easter Sunday, the Pazzi family attacks Lorenzo de' Medici, the ruler of the Republic of Florence, and kills his brother Giuliano, during High Mass in Florence Cathedral. A total of 80 accused conspirators are executed. With the death of his brother and co-ruler Giuliano, Lorenzo becomes the sole ruler of Florence.
- May 14 – The Siege of Shkodra in Albania begins. Federico Gonzaga becomes the new ruler of the independent Duchy of Mantua in Italy, three days after the death of his father, Ludovico III.
- May 28 – Captain Juan Rejón of Aragon, charged with leading the conquest of the Canary Islands for the Spanish crown, departs with 600 men on three ships from the El Puerto de Santa María, at the time part of the Kingdom of Seville.
- June 15 –
  - In the Battle of Khoy, Yaqub Aq Qoyunlu defeats his older brother, the Sultan Khalil of Aq Qoyunlu, and becomes the new Sultan.The Cambridge History of Iran. W. B. Fisher. Cambridge University Press. 1968–1991. ISBN 0-521-06935-1. Khalil is executed after his capture.
  - The Fourth Siege of Krujë comes to an end as the Albanian city surrenders to the Ottoman Empire, which had prevented food and supplies from reaching the town for a year. After the surrender, made on a promise that the occupants would be allowed to leave, most of the men in Krujë are killed and the women and children taken away to be sold as slaves.
- June 24 – After a rendezvous with other Castilian Navy ships, Captain Rejón and 1,300 men arrive at the Bay of Isletas on Gran Canaria island.
- June 26 – The Battle of Kokovo takes place when 600 peasants and miners in the Duchy of Carinthia, led by King Matjaž, attempt to defend their territory against a force of 20,000 Ottoman Turkish invaders.
- June 28 – A group of 500 of the Canarian natives, led by Adargoma, attack the Castilian invaders in the Battle of Guiniguada, and are forced to retreat from the larger and better armed Castilian force.

=== July–September ===
- July 27 – A fleet of Portuguese warships arrives at the Bay of Isletas to rescue the Canarians and drive the Castilians off of Gran Canaria. Alerted to the Portuguese invaders, Rejón arranges for an ambush of the first to come ashore.
- August 1 – Following a storm that prevents the landing of other ships at the island of Gran Canaria, the Portuguese Navy withdraws and sails back to Portugal.
- August 24 – In the Swiss canton of Lucerne, the Amstaldenhandel, a conspiracy by innkeeper Peter Amstalden of Schüpfheim to overthrow the canton government is foiled when Amstalden is arrested. After being interrogated and tortured, Amstalden is beheaded in November.
- September 1 – King Matthias Corvinus of Hungary accepts the draft of the Treaty of Brno with slight modifications regarding the division of the lands of the Bohemian crowned claimed by both Hungary and King Vladisalus II of Bohemia. Under the terms, Vladislaus II cedes Moravia, Silesia, and Lusatia to Corvinus, and both monarchs are permitted to refer to themselves as "King of Bohemia".

=== October–December ===
- October 4 – The University of Copenhagen is established by decree of King Christian I, who sets down the rules and laws to govern the institution.
- November 1 – The Spanish Inquisition begins as Pope Sixtus IV promulgates the papal bull Exigit sinceras devotionis affectus, permitting the Crown of Castile, at the request of Queen Isabella, to create the office of Inquisitor General, with the Dominican bishop Tomás de Torquemada to prosecute accused heretics.
- November 8 – Eskender succeeds his father Baeda Maryam as Emperor of Ethiopia, at the age of seven, initially under the regency of his mother, Romna Wark.
- December 28 – In the Battle of Giornico, Swiss troops defeat the army of Duchy of Milan, leading to the cession of the Leventina District by Milan to the Canton of Uri.

=== Date unknown ===
- The Demak Sultanate, the first Islamic state on the island of Java (now in Indonesia), ruled by Panembahan Jimbun, gains independence from Majapahit, after a civil war.
- Possibly the first reference to cricket (rendered as "criquet", is made in a French language manuscript.
- Mondino de Liuzzi's Anathomia corporis humani, the first complete published anatomical text, is first printed (in Padua).

== Births ==
- February 3 – Edward Stafford, 3rd Duke of Buckingham (d. 1521)
- February 7 – Thomas More, English statesman and humanist (d. 1535)
- May 26 – Pope Clement VII (d. 1534)
- June 30 – John, Prince of Asturias, Son of Ferdinand II of Aragon and Isabella I of Castile (d. 1497)
- July 2 – Louis V, Elector Palatine (1508–1544) (d. 1544)
- July 8 – Gian Giorgio Trissino (d. 1550)
- July 13 – Giulio d'Este, illegitimate son of Italian noble (d. 1561)
- July 15 – Barbara Jagiellon, Duchess consort of Saxony and Margravine consort of Meissen (1500–1534) (d. 1534)
- July 22 – King Philip the Handsome of Castile (d. 1506)
- August – Gonzalo Fernández de Oviedo y Valdés, Spanish historian (d. 1557)
- December 6 – Baldassare Castiglione, Italian courtier and writer (d. 1529)
- date unknown
  - Jacques Dubois, French anatomist (d. 1555)
  - Giovanna d'Aragona, Duchess of Amalfi, Italian regent (d. 1510)
  - Girolamo Fracastoro, Italian physician (d. 1553)
  - Visconte Maggiolo, Italian navigator and cartographer (d. 1530)
  - Katharina von Zimmern, Swiss sovereign abbess (d. 1547)
- probable
  - Thomas Ashwell, English composer
  - Madeleine Lartessuti, French shipper and banker (d. 1543)

== Deaths ==
- February 1 – Cristoforo della Rovere, Italian Catholic cardinal (b. 1434)
- February 18 – George Plantagenet, Duke of Clarence, brother of Kings Edward IV and Richard III of England (executed) (b. 1449)
- April 26 – Giuliano de' Medici, son of Piero di Cosimo de' Medici (assassinated) (b. 1453)
- June 12 – Ludovico III Gonzaga, Marquis of Mantua (b. 1412)
- August 23 – Yolande of Valois, Duchess consort of Savoy (b. 1434)
- August 28 – Donato Acciaioli, Italian scholar (b. 1428)
- November 8 – Emperor Baeda Maryam I of Ethiopia (b. 1448)
- date unknown – Aliodea Morosini, Venetian dogaressa
