= Slovene peasant revolt =

Slovene peasant revolt may refer to:

- Carinthian peasant revolt, 1478
- Slovene peasant revolt of 1515
- Croatian-Slovene peasant revolt, 1573
- Second Slovene peasant revolt, 1635
- Tolmin peasant revolt, 1713
