= Žerjav =

Žerjav is a settlement in northern Slovenia.

Žerjav is also a surname. It may refer to:

- Gregor Žerjav (1882–1929), Slovene politician
- Nadina Abarth-Žerjav (1912–2000), Slovene-Italian businesswoman
- Radovan Žerjav (born 1968), Slovene politician
