= Potok pri Vačah =

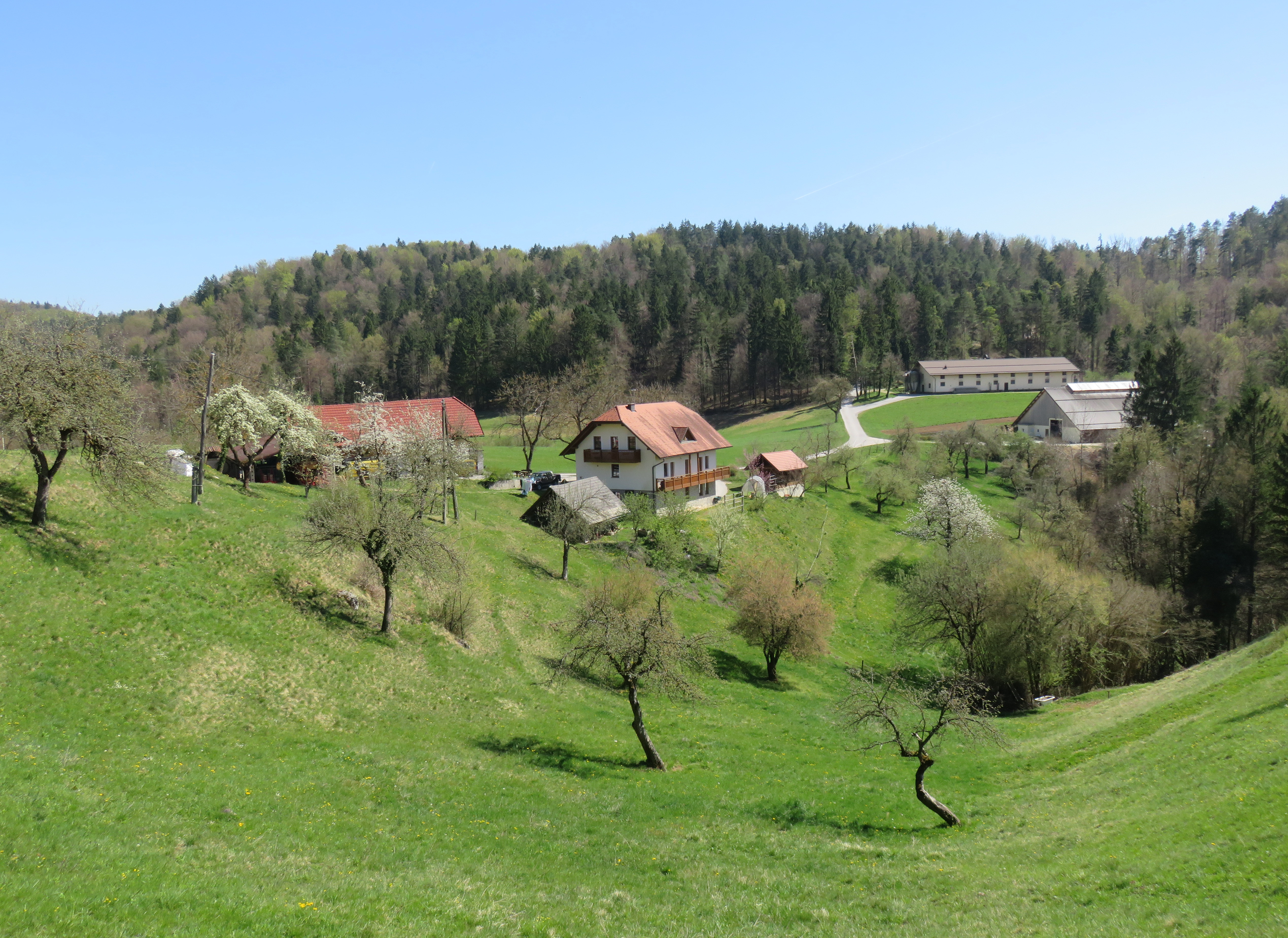

- Location in Slovenia
- Coordinates: 46°6′58.5″N 14°51′29.52″E
- Country: Slovenia
- Traditional region: Upper Carniola
- Statistical region: Central Sava
- Municipality: Litija

Area
  - Total: 2.74 km^{2} (1.06 sq mi)
- Elevation: 423.1 m (1,388 ft)

Population (2002)
  - Total: 44
- Postal code: 1252

Potok pri Vačah (pronounced [ˈpɔːtɔk pɾi ˈʋaːtʃax]) is a small settlement east of Vače in the Municipality of Litija in central Slovenia. The area is part of the traditional region of Upper Carniola. It is now included with the rest of the municipality in the Central Sava Statistical Region.

== Name ==
The name of the settlement was changed from Potok to Potok pri Vačah in 1953.

== Ljubek Castle ==
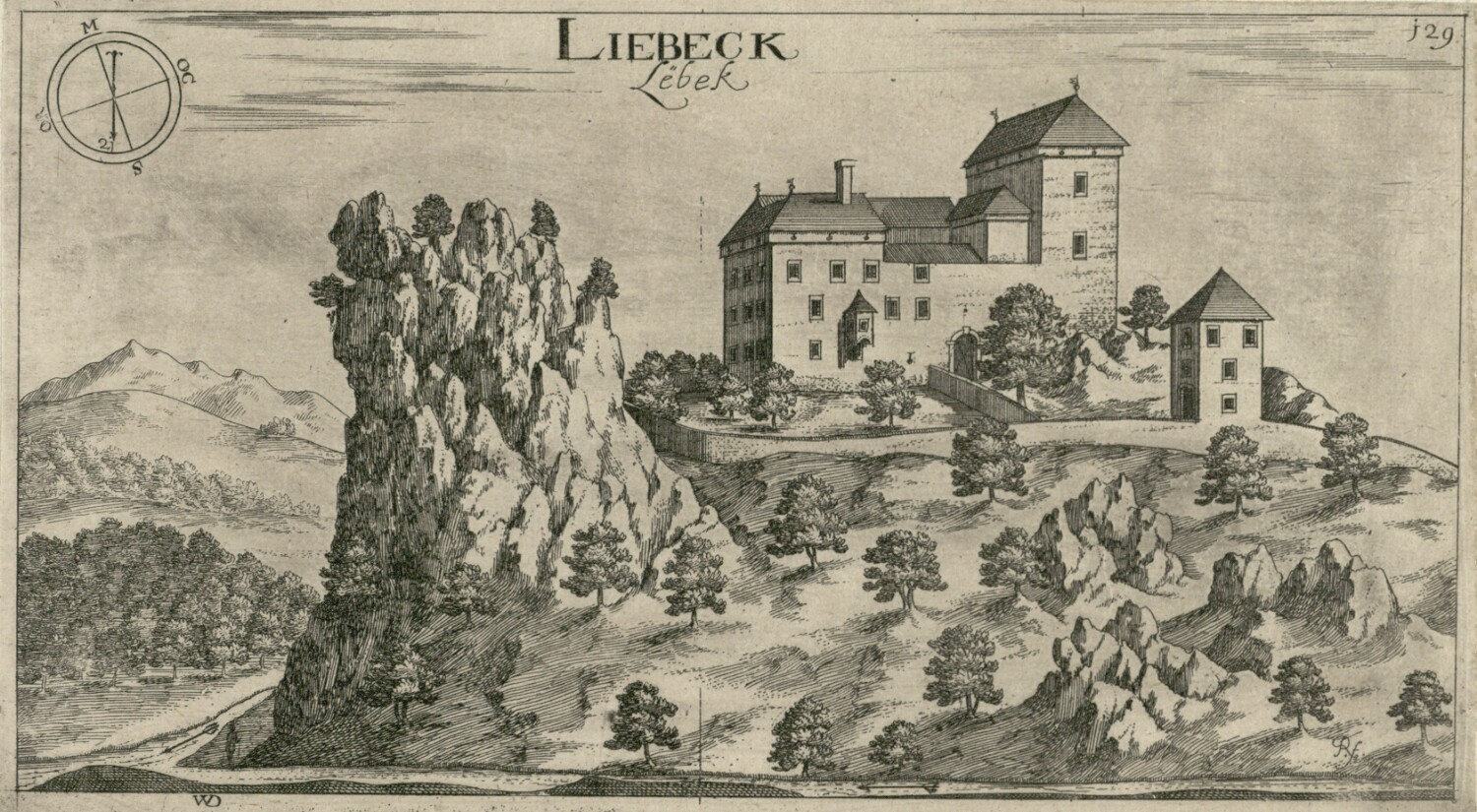
17th-century depiction of the castle

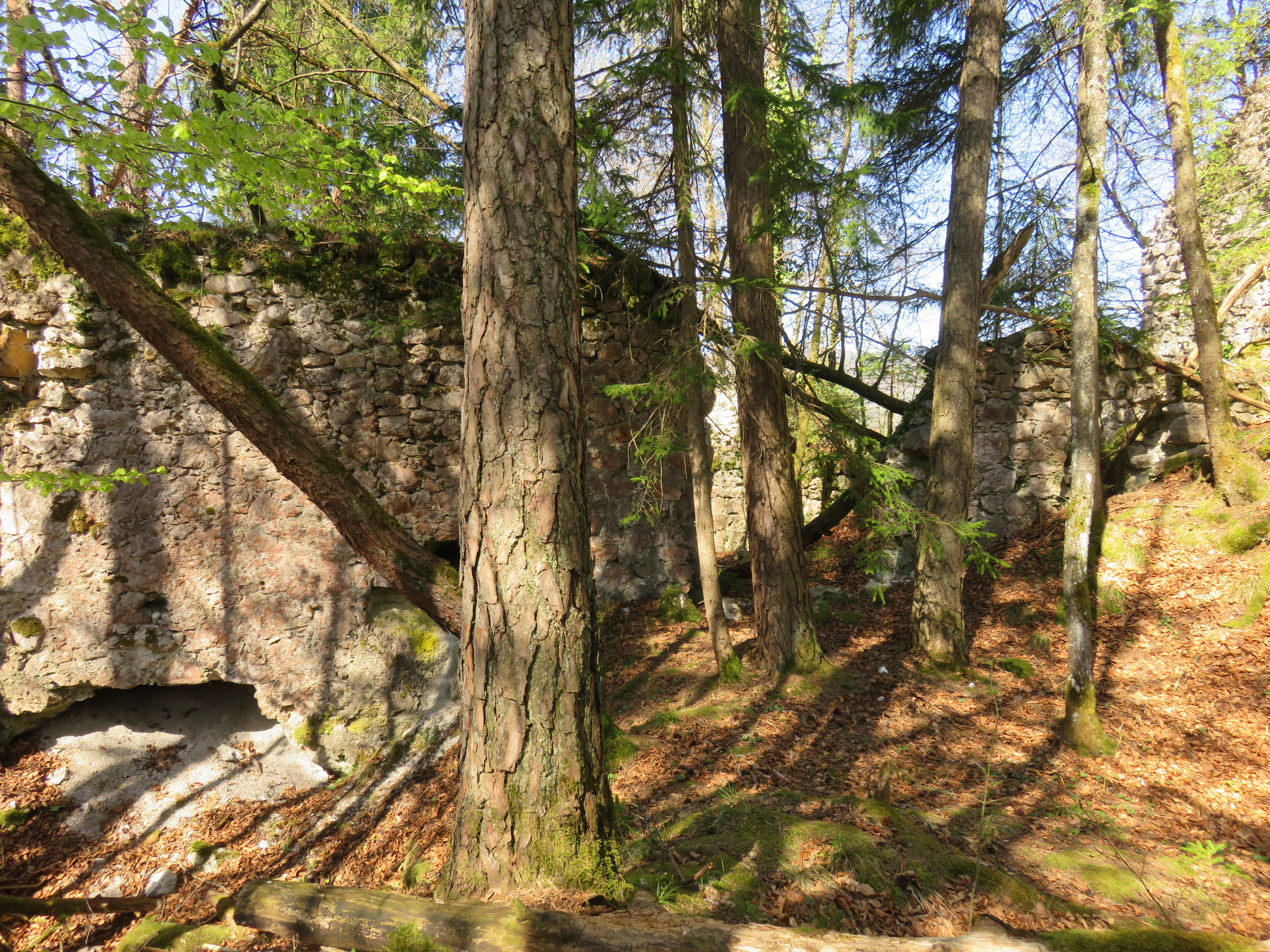
Castle ruins in 2022

Ljubek Castle

The remains of the Romanesque Ljubek Castle (or Lebek Castle), probably dating to the 11th century and first mentioned in written documents dating to 1220, can be found south of the settlement. The castle was destroyed in the peasant revolt of 1515 and was later rebuilt. Today, it is only a ruin.
