= Hochobir =

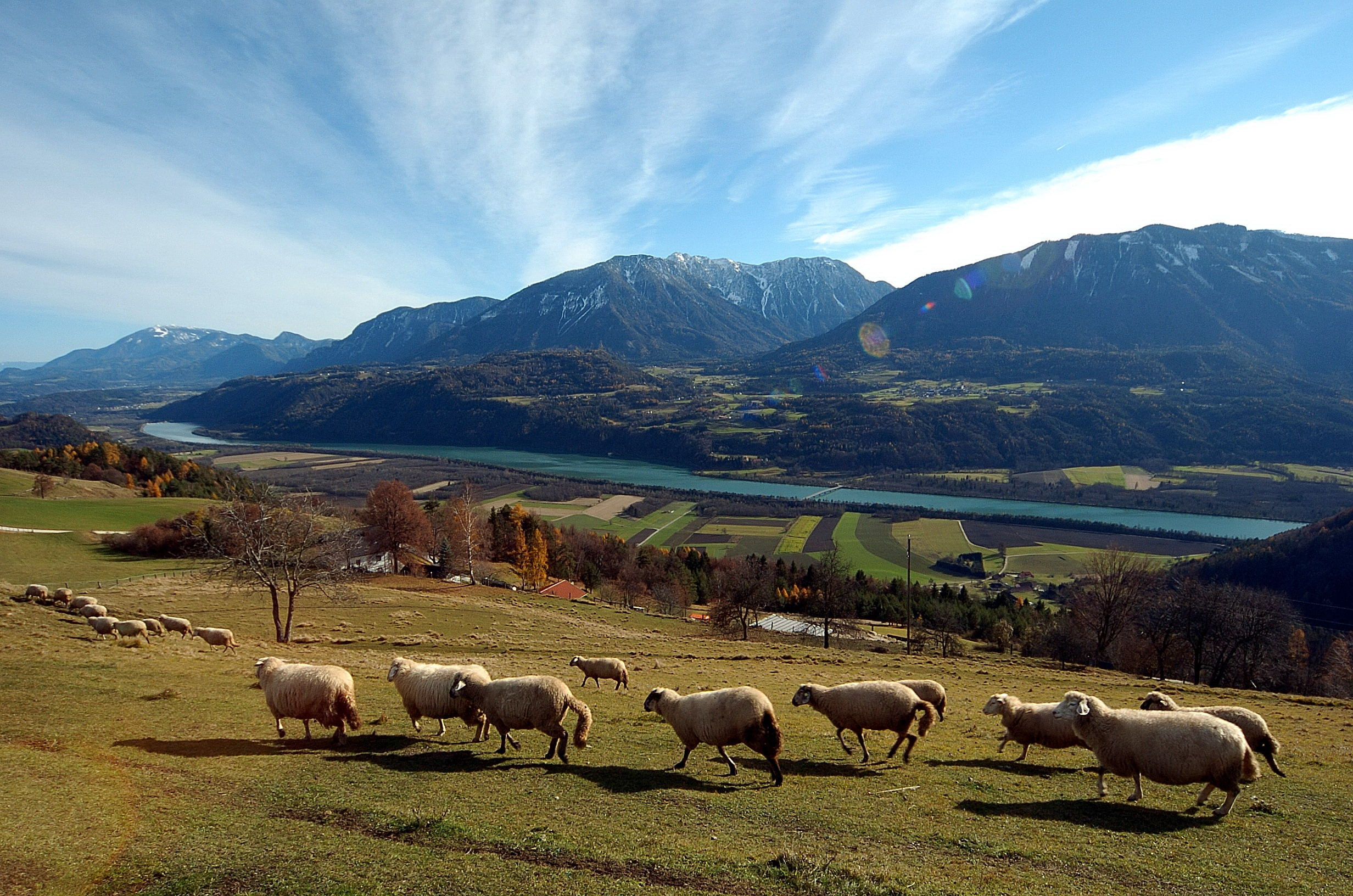

Highest point
- Elevation: 2,139 m (7,018 ft)AT
- Prominence: 15.8
- Isolation: 2139-1068(Mrzla gora)
- Coordinates: 46°30′22″N 14°29′14″E

Geography
- Location: Carinthia, Austria
- Parent range: Karawanks, Karawanks and Bacher Mountains

Geology
- Rock age: Ladinian-Carnian
- Rock type: Wetterstein limestone

Hochobir, with its peak at 2,139 m (7,018 ft), is the highest mountain in the Obir massif, located in the northern Karawanks range. Other notable peaks are Kuhberg (2,026 metres (6,647 ft)), Kleinobir (1,948 metres (6,391 ft)), Vielspitz (1,624 metres (5,328 ft)), and Altberg (1,552 metres (5,092 ft)). In the eastern part of the massif, there are the Obir dripstone caves, developed into show caves, and in the northern part, the Wildenstein Waterfall. From 1891 until its destruction in World War II, the summit housed the Hannwarte meteorological station. The 500 kg summit cross on Hochobir is made of metal, standing 7 meters high and 3 meters wide. It was erected in 1972.

== Etymology ==
The name Obir is recorded as Obier in 1637 and can be traced back to the Slovenian word ober – giant. The term "Hochobir" was transferred from the nearby mining area to the Obir summit, and the Slovenian name Ojstrc means peak.

In the Carinthian capital Klagenfurt, Obirstraße is named after the massif. There are also Obirstraße in Völkermarkt and Eberndorf.

== Tourism ==
The Hochobir summit is accessible via an easy two-hour hike from the Eisenkappler Hut (1,553 metres (5,095 ft)). The hut is reachable by an 8 kilometer toll road. The toll road can be accessed from the Ebriach valley branching off from Bad Eisenkappel or from the Schaidasattel (1,068 metres (3,504 ft)). From the summit, there is a panoramic view. To the west, there are the Hohe Tauern, to the north the Saualpe, to the east the Petzen. To the south, the view is limited by the Karawanks and Steiner Alps.

== Regional flora ==
At Hochobir, among other things, the Austrian gymnadenia (Gymnadenia lithopolitanica) and Kerner's Alpine poppy (Papaver alpinum), can be found, which differ from the usual representatives in the southern limestone Alps.

== Gallery ==
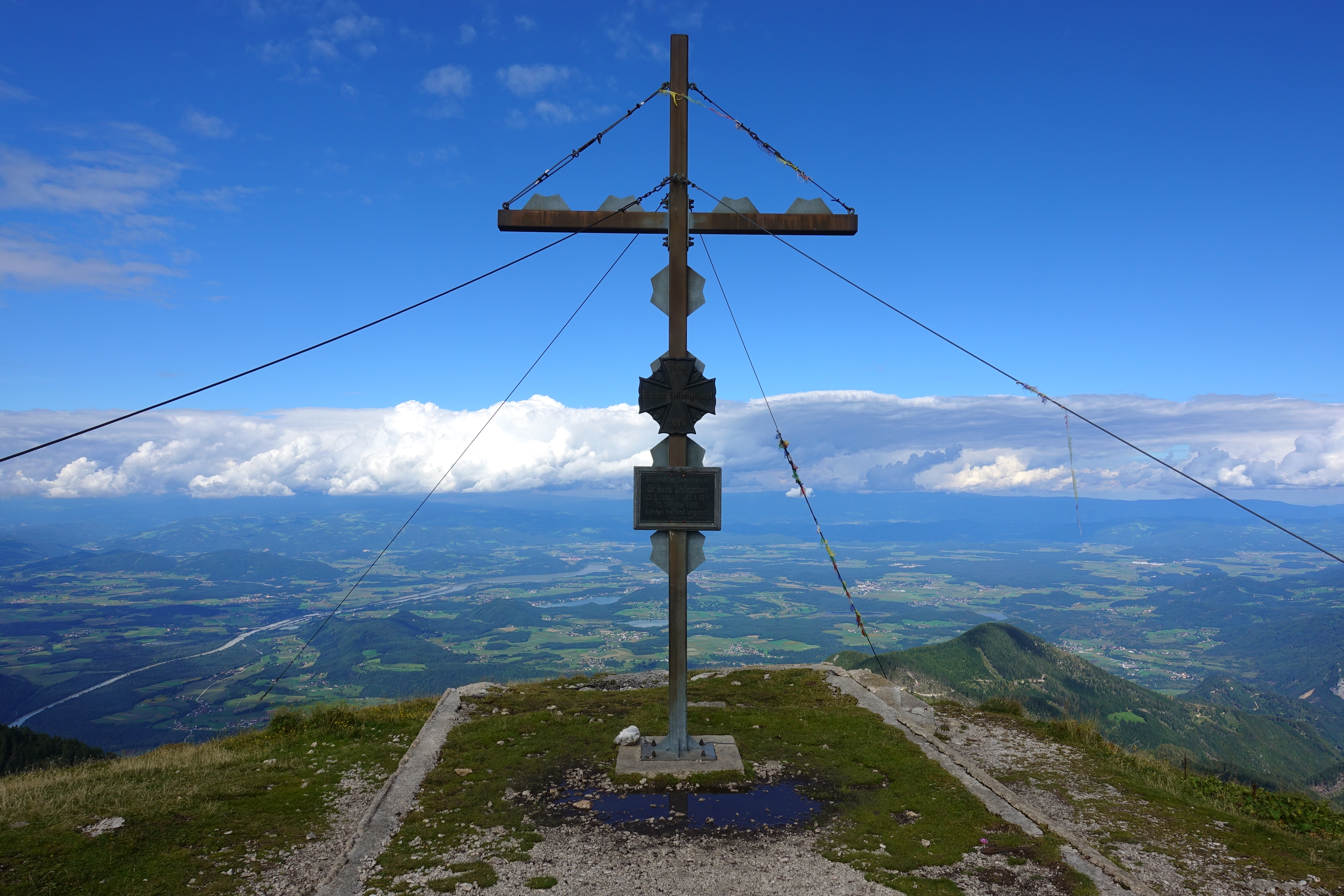
Hochobir summit cross

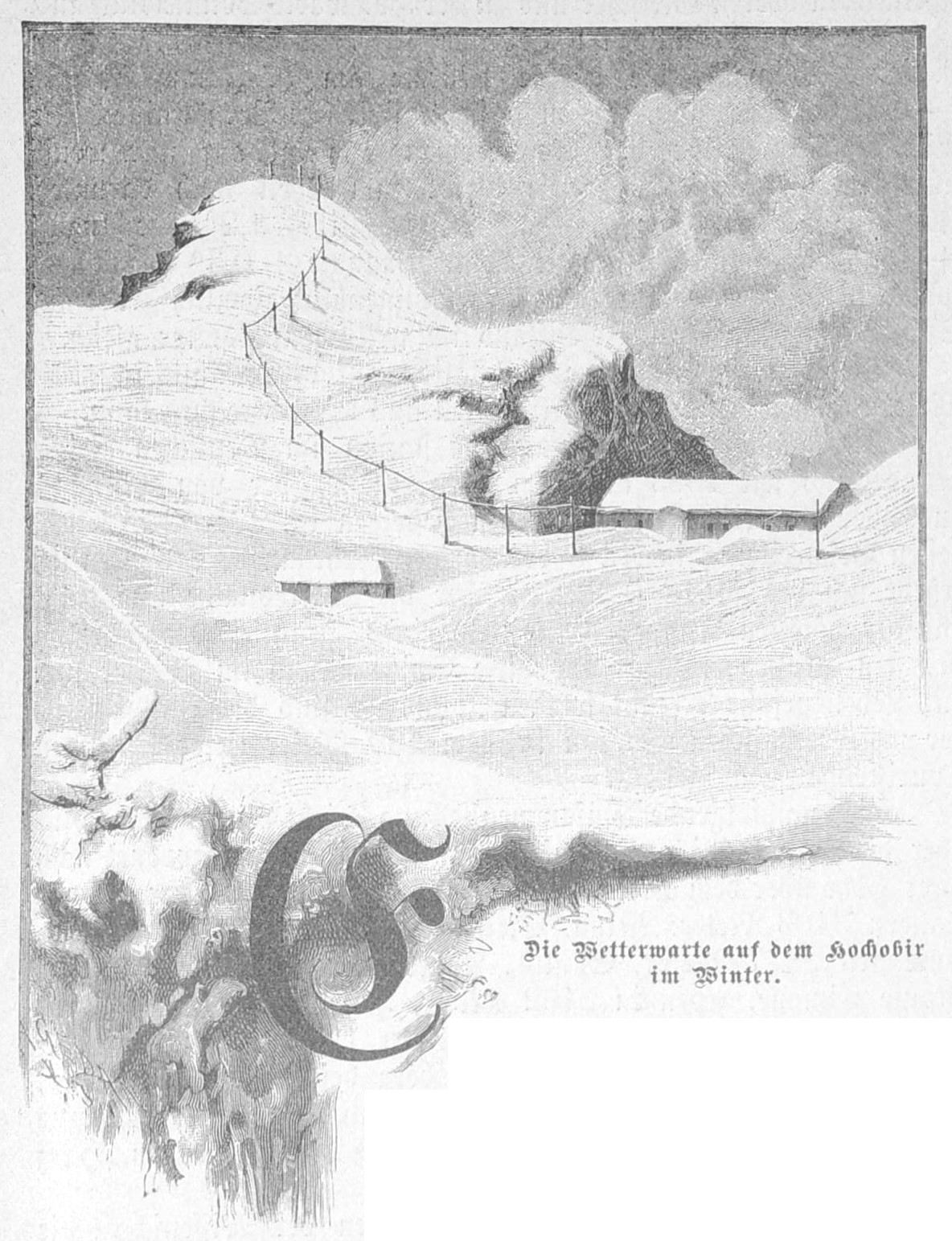
The Rainer-Shelter in the Gartenlaube (1888)

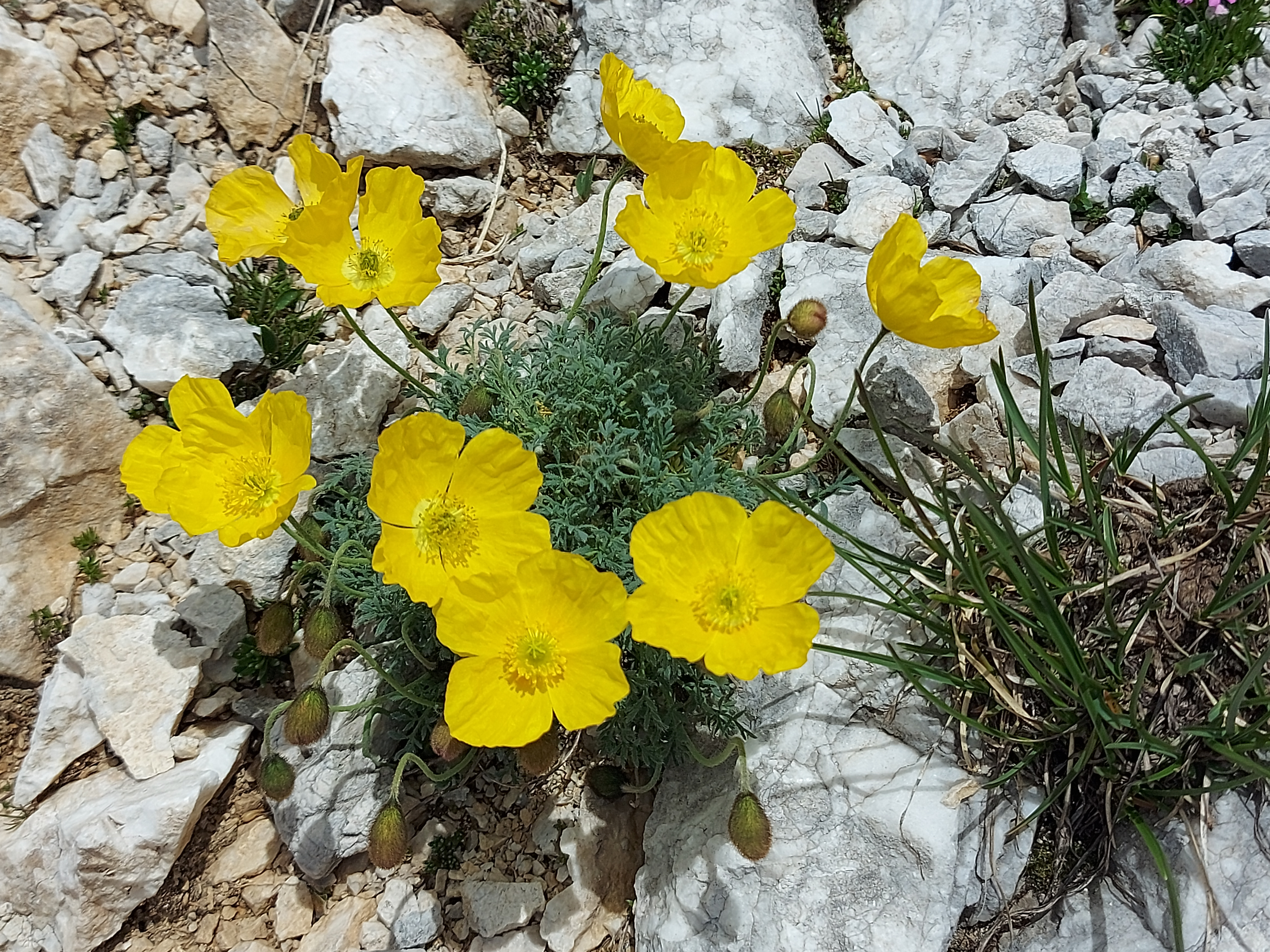
Alpine poppy (Papaver alpinum)

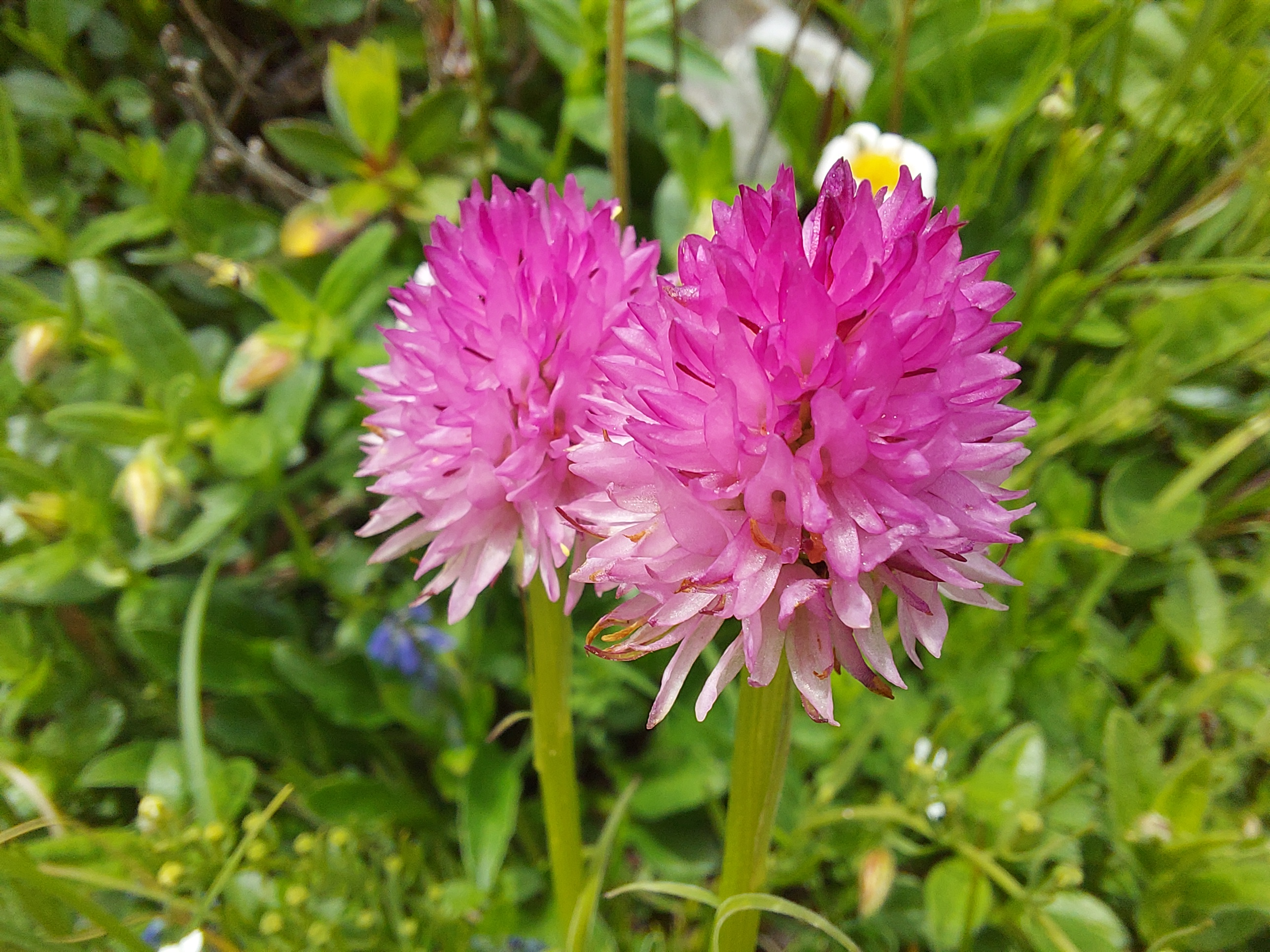
Austrian gymnadenia (Gymnadenia lithopolitanica)

== Literature ==
- Hans M. Tuschar: Karawanks. A guide to valleys, huts and mountains (Alpenvereinsführer. Series: Southern Limestone Alps.). Written according to the guidelines of the UIAA. Bergverlag Rother, Munich 1990, ISBN 3-7633-1262-5.
- Manfred Posch: Magic Kingdom Karawanks. The most beautiful tours. Kärntner Druck- und Verlagsgesellschaft m.b.H, Klagenfurt 1997, ISBN 3-85391-143-9.
