= Bistra, Črna na Koroškem =

Bistra
- Location in Slovenia
- Coordinates: 46°26′38.09″N 14°47′15.36″E
- Country: Slovenia
- Traditional region: Carinthia
- Statistical region: Carinthia
- Municipality: Črna na Koroškem

Area
  - Total: 26.32 km^{2} (10.16 sq mi)
- Elevation: 871.3 m (2,859 ft)

Population (2020)
  - Total: 79
  - Density: 3.0/km^{2} (7.8/sq mi)

Bistra (pronounced [ˈbiːstɾa]) is a dispersed settlement in the valley of Bistra Creek (from which it gets its name), a tributary of the Meža River, and the surrounding hills southwest of Črna na Koroškem in the Carinthia region in northern Slovenia. It is located near the Slovenia–Austria border.

== Etymology ==
Bistra and names like it (e.g., Bistrica) are common in Slovene ethnic territory. Such names were originally hydronyms that were later applied to the settlements along rivers or streams with these names. The names are derived from Slavic *bystra 'swiftly flowing (river)', from the Slavic adjective *bystrъ 'swiftly flowing, rushing'. Bistra is named after Bistra Creek, a left tributary of the Meža River.

== History ==
According to a local legend, the first Count of Celje and King Frederik I first visited the location in the mid-14th century. He arrived on horseback in the valley, and immediately expressed his admiration for its nature and scenery. He sat by the river for hours, when a bee landed on his shoulder. Frederik I was known to be an admirer of nature, and so from this moment he knew that he had to establish a settlement there. He decided to name the village Bistra. Frederik I continued to visit Bistra until his death in 1359.

== Geography ==
Bistra has a continental European climate, with cool winters and warm summers. The village has an elevation of around 847 meters (2,779 ft).

== Tourism ==
The Bistra Valley is known for its walking and hiking paths. Many hikers pass through the valley for its scenery, and it lies along some mountain hiking routes, such as to Mount Kordež (Slovene: Kordeževa glava).
