= Topla, Črna na Koroškem =

Topla
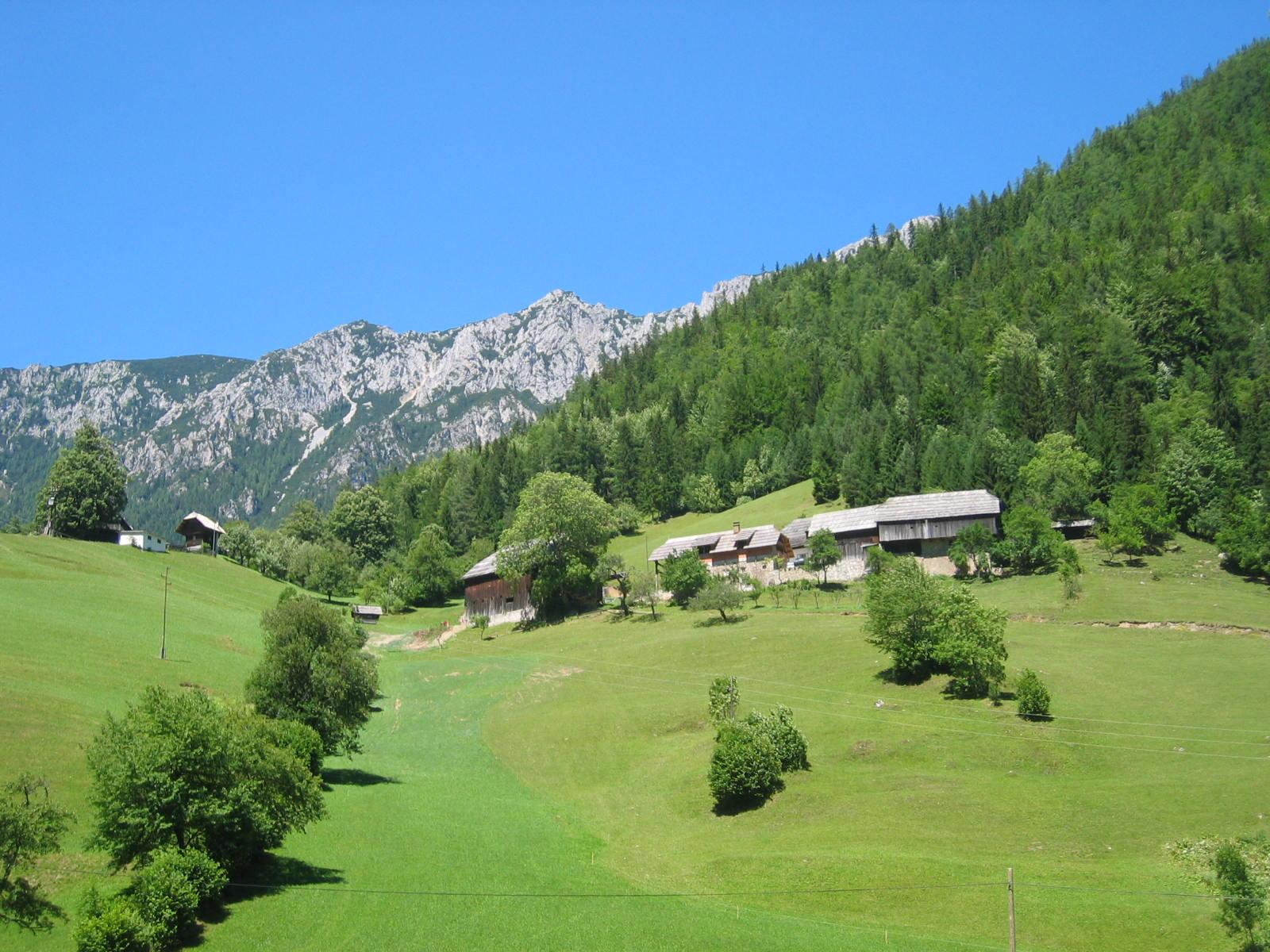

- Location in Slovenia
- Coordinates: 46°29′9.18″N 14°45′51.78″E
- Country: Slovenia
- Traditional region: Carinthia
- Statistical region: Carinthia
- Municipality: Črna na Koroškem

Area
  - Total: 13.43 km^{2} (5.19 sq mi)
- Elevation: 1,084.5 m (3,558 ft)

Population (2020)
  - Total: 31
  - Density: 2.3/km^{2} (6.0/sq mi)

Topla (pronounced [ˈtoːpla]) is a dispersed settlement of isolated farmsteads in a valley with the same name at the foothills of Mount Peca west of Črna na Koroškem in the Carinthia region in northern Slovenia, close to the border with Austria.
