= Podpeca =

- Location in Slovenia
- Coordinates: 46°29′22.19″N 14°49′18.06″E
- Country: Slovenia
- Traditional region: Carinthia
- Statistical region: Carinthia
- Municipality: Črna na Koroškem

Area
  - Total: 18.5 km^{2} (7.1 sq mi)
- Elevation: 929.2 m (3,049 ft)

Population (2020)
  - Total: 191
  - Density: 10.3/km^{2} (26.7/sq mi)

Podpeca (pronounced [pɔtˈpeːtsa]) is a settlement at the foothills of Mount Peca northwest of Črna na Koroškem in the Carinthia region in northern Slovenia.

The local church in the settlement is dedicated to Saint Helen and belongs to the parish of Črna na Koroškem. It dates to the 15th century and contains 17th- and 18th-century furnishings.
