= Javorje, Črna na Koroškem =

Javorje
- Location in Slovenia
- Coordinates: 46°27′19.47″N 14°54′26.83″E
- Country: Slovenia
- Traditional region: Carinthia
- Statistical region: Carinthia
- Municipality: Črna na Koroškem

Area
  - Total: 20.81 km^{2} (8.03 sq mi)
- Elevation: 973.1 m (3,193 ft)

Population (2020)
  - Total: 141
  - Density: 6.78/km^{2} (17.5/sq mi)

Javorje (pronounced [jaˈʋoːɾjɛ]) is a dispersed settlement in the hills southeast of Črna na Koroškem in the Carinthia region in northern Slovenia.

The parish church in the settlement is dedicated to Mary Magdalene and belongs to the Roman Catholic Archdiocese of Maribor. It was first mentioned in written documents dating to the 14th century, but has been rebuilt at various stages, receiving its current Baroque appearance in the 18th century. There is a second church in the eastern part of the settlement belonging to the same parish. It is dedicated to Saint Jodocus and dates to the 17th century. It is a single-nave church with a rib-vaulted sanctuary and a spire.

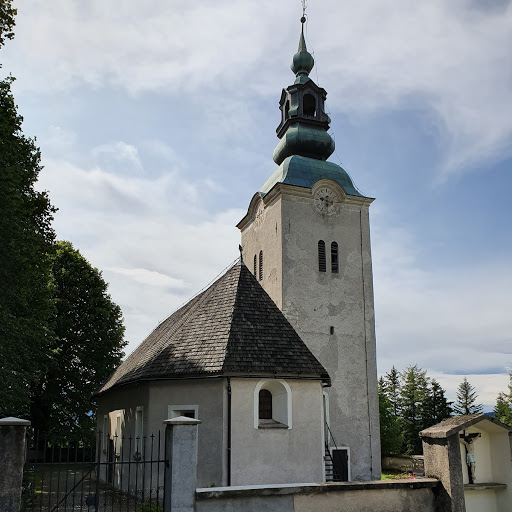
Mary Magdalene Parish Church

At an elevation of 1,160 metres (3,810 ft), the elementary school in Javorje is the highest-elevation school in Slovenia.
