= Municipality of Črna na Koroškem =

Municipality of Slovenia

Municipality of Črna na Koroškem Občina Črna na Koroškem
- Municipality
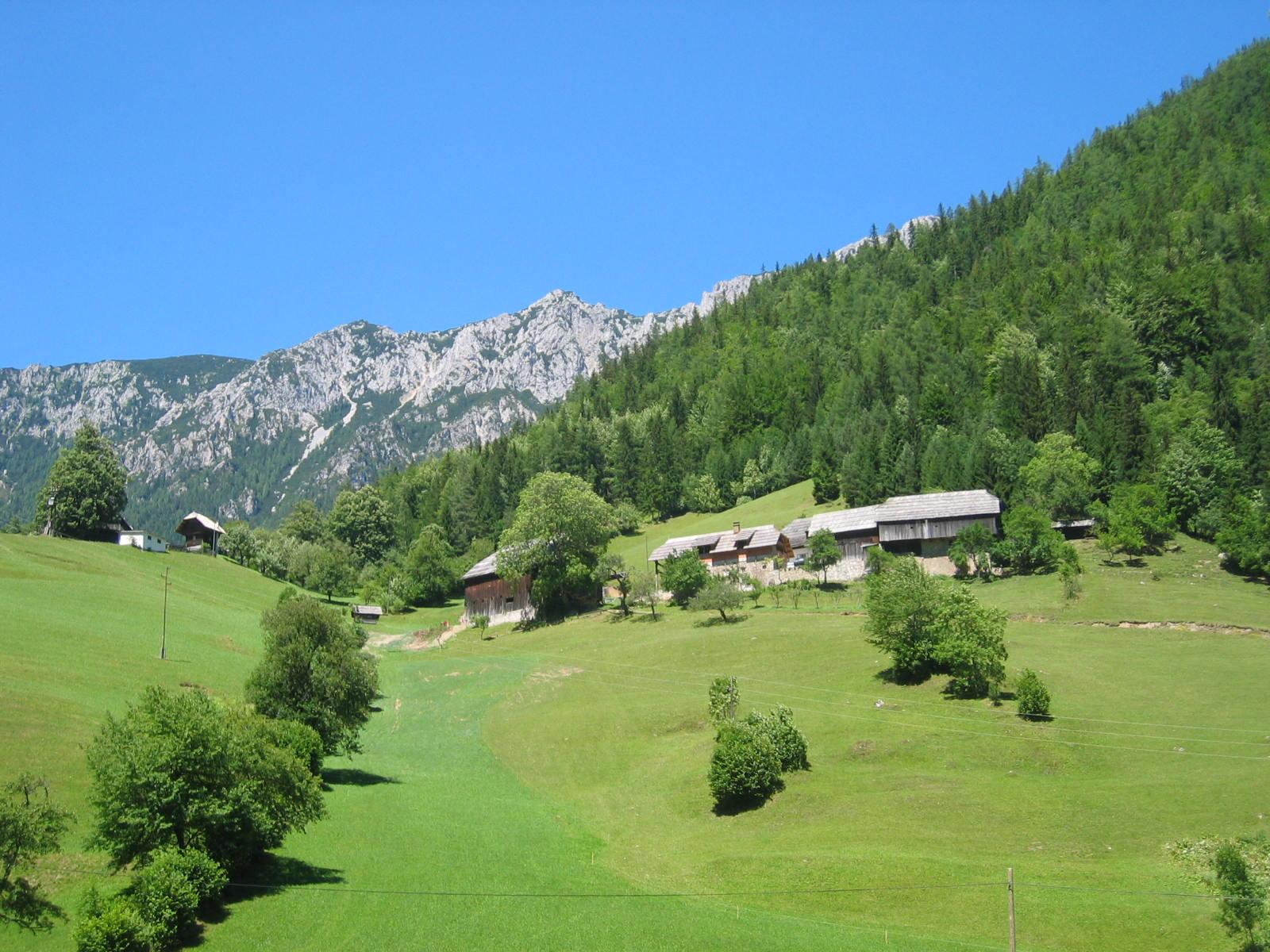

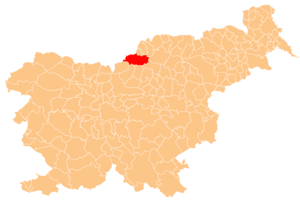
- Location of the Municipality of Črna na Koroškem in Slovenia
- Coordinates: 46°28′N 14°51′E
- Country: Slovenia

Government
  - Mayor: Janez Švab (Independent)

Area
  - Total: 156.0 km^{2} (60.2 sq mi)

Population (2002)
  - Total: 3,616
  - Density: 23.18/km^{2} (60.03/sq mi)
- Time zone: UTC+01 (CET)
  - Summer (DST): UTC+02 (CEST)
- Website: www.crna.si

The Municipality of Črna na Koroškem (Slovene: Občina Črna na Koroškem) is a municipality in northern Slovenia. The seat of the municipality is the town of Črna na Koroškem. It lies in the traditional Slovenian province of Carinthia, close to the border with Austria. Since 2005 it has been part of the larger Carinthia Statistical Region. It borders Austria.

== Geography ==
The municipal area stretches along the upper Meža Valley at the confluence of the Meža River with its tributary Javorje Creek (Slovene: Javorski potok). The surrounding mountains of the Karawanks and Kamnik–Savinja Alps ranges include the Peca massif at the Austrian border in the northwest, with the summit of Kordež Head (Slovene: Kordeževa glava) reaching an elevation of 2,126 m (6,975 ft). Due to its picturesque setting, the municipality is a popular destination for mountain hikers.

=== Settlements ===
In addition to the municipal seat of Črna na Koroškem, the municipality also includes the following settlements:

- Bistra
- Javorje
- Jazbina
- Koprivna
- Ludranski Vrh
- Podpeca
- Topla
- Žerjav
