= Carlo Abarth =

Italian automobile designer (1908–1979)

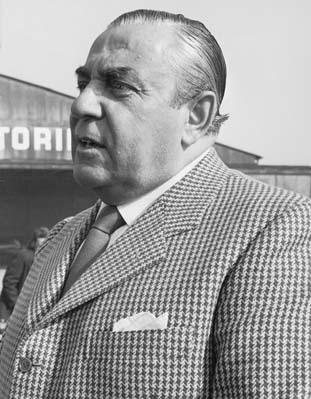
- Abarth in 1971
- Born: Karl Albert Abarth; 15 November 1908; Vienna, Austria-Hungary
- Died: 24 October 1979 (aged 70); Vienna, Austria
- Occupation: Automobile designer
- Years active: 1925–1971

Carlo Abarth (15 November 1908 – 24 October 1979), born Karl Albert Abarth, was an Italian automobile designer.

Abarth was born in Austria but later was naturalized as an Italian citizen. At this time, his first name Karl Albert was changed to its Italian equivalent of Carlo Alberto.

== Biography ==
=== Before World War II ===
Abarth was born in Vienna, during the time of the Austro-Hungarian Empire. As a teenager, he worked for Castagna in Italy (1925–27), designing motorbike and bicycle chassis. Back in Austria, he worked for Motor Thun and Joseph Opawsky (1927–34), and raced motorbikes, winning his first race on a James Cycle in Salzburg on 29 July 1928. He would be European champion five times, along with continuing his engineering. After a serious accident in Linz he abandoned motorbike racing, and designed a sidecar (1933) with which he managed to beat the Orient Express railway on the 1,300-kilometre (810 mi) stretch from Vienna to Ostend (1934).

He moved permanently to Italy in 1934, where he met Ferdinand Porsche's son-in-law Anton Piëch, and married his secretary. In 1939, Abarth was long hospitalized and had his racing career end, due to a racing accident in Ljubljana, Slovenia, on Večna pot. Other than visits to Austria and Italy, he remained in Slovenia until the war was over. During this time he worked at Ignaz Vok's factory in Ljubljana (Šiška).

=== After World War II ===
Following this, he moved to Merano, from where his ancestors originated. Abarth got to know both Tazio Nuvolari and the family-friend Ferry Porsche, and, together with engineer Rudolf Hruska and Piero Dusio, he established the Compagnia Industriale Sportiva Italia (CIS Italia, later becoming Cisitalia), having the Italian Porsche Konstruktionen agency (1943–48). The first automobile outcome of this cooperation was the rather unsuccessful Tipo 360 F1 prototype (see also Porsche 360). The CIS Italia project ended when Dusio moved to Argentina (1949).

Abarth then founded the Abarth & C. company with Cisitalia racing driver Guido Scagliarini in Bologna (31 March 1949), using his astrological sign, the scorpion, as the company logo. The same year, Abarth & Co moved to Turin. Financed by Scagliarini's father Armando Scagliarini, the company made racing cars, and became a major supplier of high-performance exhaust pipes, that still are in production as Abarth. On 20 October 1965 Abarth personally set various speed records at the Autodromo Nazionale Monza.

He sold the company on 31 July 1971 to Fiat, although he continued to manage it as a CEO for a period. Later he moved back to Vienna, Austria, where he died in 1979.

== Personal life ==
Carlo Abarth was married three times. His first wife was the secretary of Volkswagen's head Anton Piëch in Vienna.

He married his second wife, Nadina Abarth-Žerjav from Ljubljana, in November 1949. She was the daughter of the Slovenian liberal politician Gregor Žerjav and was known polyglot. They lived together in northern Italy until 1966, and they divorced in 1979.

The same year, about six weeks before his death, Abarth married his third wife, Anneliese Abarth; she continues to head the Carlo Abarth Foundation and wrote one of his biographies in 2010.

== Sources ==
- Greggio, Luciano (2002). Abarth, L'uomo, le macchine (in Italian). G. Nada. ISBN 88-7911-262-7.
- Abarth, Anneliese (2010). Carlo Abarth: Mein Leben mit dem genialen Autokonstrukteur (in German). Herbig Verlag. ISBN 978-3-7766-2631-5.
