= Carinthian Peasant Revolt =

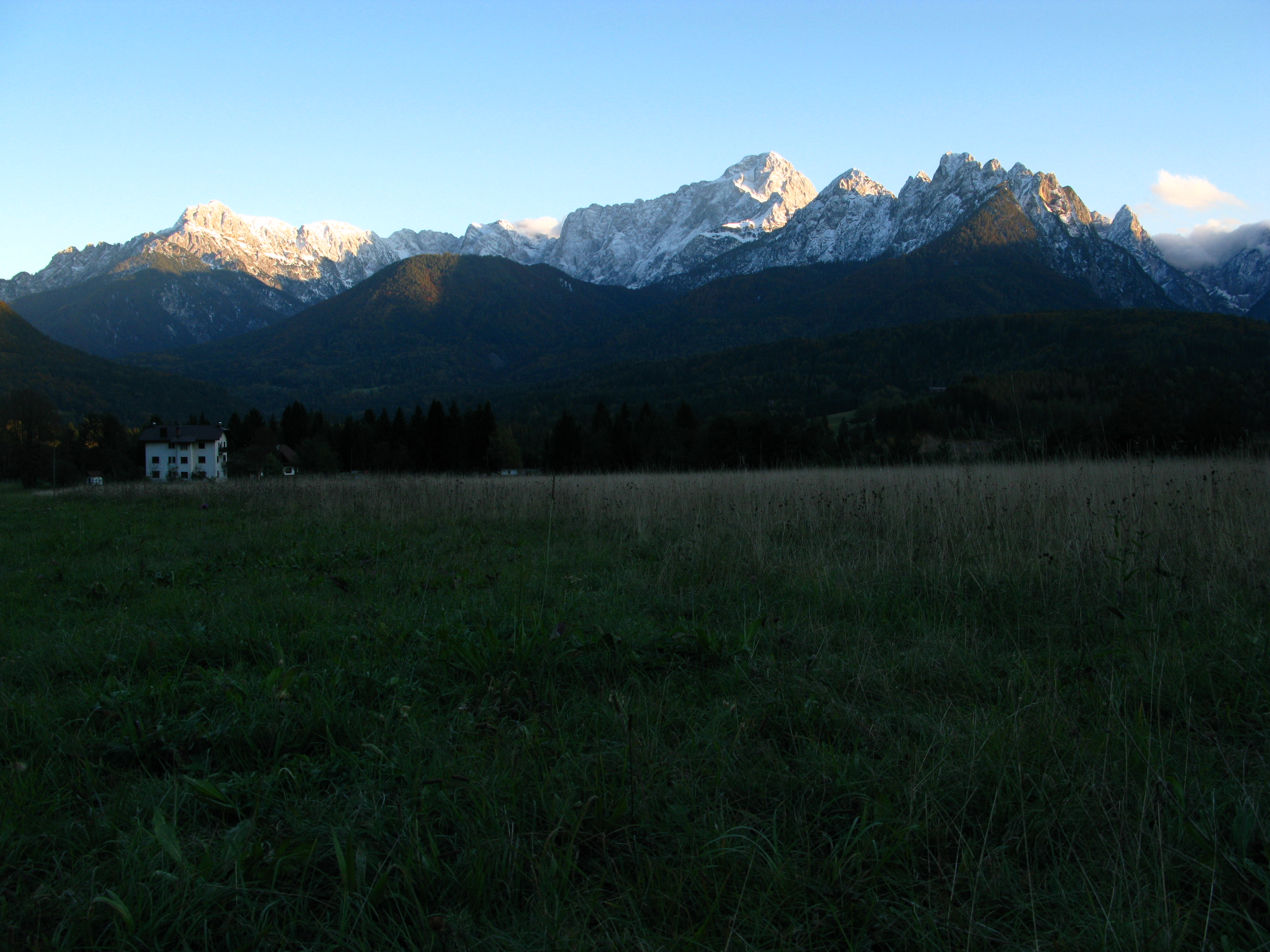
- View over the Kokovo Field
Date	1478
Location	Duchy of Carinthia (modern Austria, Slovenia, Italy)
Result	Suppression of revolt and execution of participants

Belligerents
Carinthian Peasants League	Ottoman Empire	Austria

Commanders and leaders
Peter Wunderlich †	Mehmed II	Frederick III

Strength
3,000	~20,000	unknown

Casualties and losses
- 300

The Carinthian Peasant Revolt (German: Kärntner Bauernaufstand; Slovene: koroški kmečki upor) took place in the Duchy of Carinthia (present-day Austria, Slovenia, and Italy) in 1478. It was the first of several larger peasant revolts in the area of Inner Austria. After several Ottoman raids from 1473 onwards, the rural population established a peasants' association that was an effort to take the defence of the farmers' homes into their own hands and was also aimed against the ruling nobility that had failed to protect the farmers from attacks by marauding Turkish akinji cavalry. The revolt was eventually suppressed.

== Background ==
The Ottoman forces had entered the Balkan peninsula during the disintegration of the Serbian Empire in the 14th century. In 1389 they defeated a Serbian army at the Battle of Kosovo. Upon the Fall of Constantinople in 1453, Turkish troops advanced northwestwards and in 1469 reached the borders of the Holy Roman Empire entering the southeastern Duchy of Carniola.

In view of the threat, the Carinthian estates had strong fortifications erected and mountain pass routes secured. The Habsburg administration under Emperor Frederick III imposed new taxes and contributions on the local population to fund the operations. Nevertheless, in late September 1473, Ottoman forces first crossed the Seeberg Saddle and plundered the Drava and Glan valleys. Again in 1476, they moved into Carinthia from the upper Sava valley, laid siege to the Arnoldstein monastery, moved into the Gail valley and devastated the area of Villach. They set up a camp at Wernberg, from where they started further raids.

== Course ==
Carinthia saw five Turkish incursions into its territory between 1473 and 1483, with much plundering and killing at the hands of Turkish cavalry. According to the contemporary chronicler Jakob Unrest, the local nobility had no answer to the large numbers of Turkish cavalry, they moved into their fortified castles, while the clergy fortified its churches and monasteries and held out there. This left the peasants of Carinthia without any protection. Modelled on the Swiss Confederacy, they decided to take their fate into their own hands.

On 2 February 1478, the Carinthian Peasants' League (German: Kärntner Bauernbund) was formed in the Ortenburg lands at Spittal an der Drau under the leadership of one Peter Wunderlich, raising some concern among the local nobility and clergy. Meanwhile, the Ottoman–Venetian War raged through the Isonzo valley in the south, where the Turks unsuccessfully besieged the fortress of Gradisca and then turned northwards into the Julian Alps. In May the farmers gathered at Villach where they organized a 3,000-strong army to face the invaders. They started obstructing the steep Predil Pass route, however, a 20,000-strong Turkish contingent of professional akinji cavalry were able to remove the barriers and to abseil their horses over rocky terrain.

When on June 25 the Ottoman forces came down the mountains and neared Tarvis, most peasants fled overnight to protect their belongings. The next day only a small group of some 530 peasants and 70 miners from Bleiberg chose to make a stand against the Turks and to try to stop them at the Battle of Kokovo (Goggau) near Tarvis. About 300 men died in the futile attempt, surrounded and slain by about 20,000 akinji horsemen. The Turkish army broke through and proceeded to plunder all the way up to Millstatt Abbey and Gmünd in Upper Carinthia.

== Epilogue ==
Immediately after the withdrawal of the Ottoman forces, the rest of the revolting peasants were accused of treachery and eventually put on trial for their revolt. The leader of the uprising Peter Wunderlich was captured near Gmünd, sentenced to death and publicly dismembered in Lendorf. The peasants remained hard-pressed, particularly as Emperor Frederick moreover entered into the Austrian–Hungarian War against King Matthias Corvinus.

== See also ==
- Slovene peasant revolt of 1515
- List of peasant revolts
