= Gregor Žerjav =

Slovenian lawyer and politician (1882–1929)

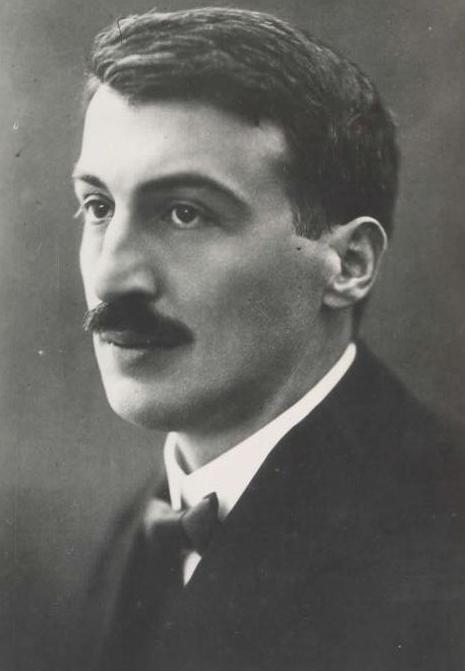
- Žerjav in 2010

Minister of Forestry and Mining
- In office November 1924 – July 1925

Minister for Welfare
- In office December 1921 – December 1922

Personal details
- Born: November 14, 1882 Lož, Austria-Hungary
- Died: June 27, 1929 (aged 46) Poljče, Kingdom of Serbs, Croats and Slovenes
- Resting place: Žale Cemetery, Ljubljana
- Party: National Progressive Party (before 1918); Yugoslav Democratic Party (1918–1919); Democratic Party (Yugoslavia) (1919–1925); Independent Democratic Party (Yugoslavia) (1925–1929)
- Spouse: Milena Žerjav
- Children: 3, including Nadina Abarth-Žerjav
- Education: University of Vienna (LL.D., 1906)
- Occupation: Lawyer; politician
- Known for: Leader of Slovenian liberals

Gregor Žerjav, sometimes spelled Žerjal (14 November 1882 – 27 June 1929), was a Slovene and Yugoslav lawyer and liberal politician. Together with Albert Kramer, he was the leader of the Slovenian liberals in the Kingdom of Serbs, Croats and Slovenes.

== Early life and education ==
Gregor Zerjav was born in Lož in Inner Carniola, Austria-Hungary (now in Slovenia). He studied law at the University of Vienna, graduating in 1906.

== Political career ==
In 1908, Gregor Zerjav became the chief coordinator of the National Progressive Party in Carniola. Despite his young age, he became one of the main financial advisors of the Slovene national liberal political establishment. In 1910, he became notorious for his involvement in the bankruptcy of the Agro Merkur credit bank, established a few years earlier as a financial institution supporting the National Progressive Party. In 1911, he was elected to the Austrian parliament, where he became the leader of the 'Yugoslav Club', a caucus of South Slav national liberal representatives from the Slovene Lands, Istria, and Dalmatia.

After the outbreak of World War I, Žerjav launched an underground network which was working against the Austro-Hungarian Monarchy in favour of the creation of a unified Yugoslav state. Among his closest collaborators in this endeavour were two other radical liberal nationalists from the younger generation, Albert Kramer and Bogumil Vošnjak. The Austro-Hungarian authorities never disclosed the network. However, already in the first moths of the war, Žerjav was preventively arrested and imprisoned in Ljubljana Castle for his "notorious pro-Serbian attitudes". He was released after less than a month. In May 1915, when his colleague Bogumil Vošnjak fled to the west in order to join the Yugoslav Committee, Žerjav was again arrested and put into custody in the town of Gmund and later in Graz, where he spent most of the war.

After the breakup of the Austro-Hungarian Empire, Žerjav was part of the delegation of Austro-Hungarian South Slavs which in December 1918 signed the declaration establishing the Kingdom of Serbs, Croats and Slovenes. After 1918, Žerjav became a fervent supporter of Yugoslav centralism and unitarism. In June 1918, he was among the co-founders of the Yugoslav Democratic Party, which in 1919 merged into the State Party of Serbian, Croatian and Slovene Democrats.

He was elected to the Yugoslav parliament for three consecutive terms, in 1920, 1925, and 1927 (the first time as representative of the Democratic Party, and the last two on the list of the Independent Democratic Party. From December 1921 to December 1922, he served as the Minister for Welfare, and between November 1924 and July 1925 as Minister of Forestry and Mining in the Democratic-Radical coalition governments of Nikola Pašić.

== Personal life ==
Gregor Žerjav was married to Milena Žerjav, née Lavrenčič. The couple had three children, first the twins Nadežda Nada and Tatjana (born 5 March 1912 in Gorizia) and later Borut (born in Graz/Gradec 1 December 1916).

The last years of his life he suffered tuberculosis; for an attempt of operative surgery he went to Berlin to the Charité as one of the first patients of Ferdinand Sauerbruch when using the iron lung there. About half a year later he died in his estate in Poljče near Radovljica, and was buried in Žale Cemetery in Ljubljana. His wife and this daughter Tatjana also died of tuberculosis later on.

His son Borut Žerjav became a journalist and lived in Paris. His daughter Nadina Abarth-Žerjav was married to Carlo Abarth.

The family's grave site in Žale Cemetery is a protected monument.
