= Žerjav, Črna na Koroškem =

Žerjav
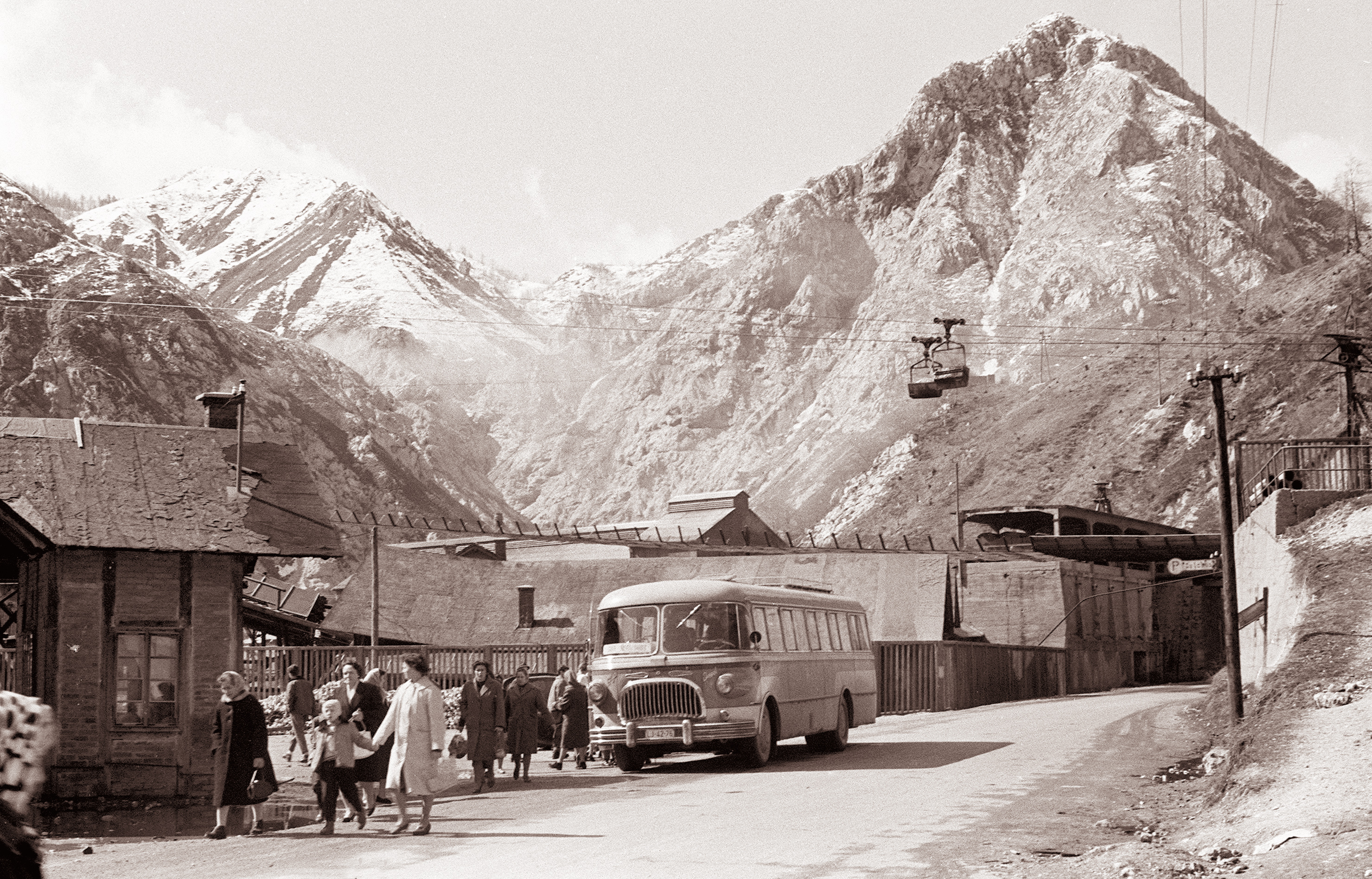

- Location in Slovenia
- Coordinates: 46°29′5.9″N 14°52′10.2″E
- Country: Slovenia
- Traditional region: Carinthia
- Statistical region: Carinthia
- Municipality: Črna na Koroškem

Area
  - Total: 7.37 km^{2} (2.85 sq mi)
- Elevation: 536.8 m (1,761 ft)

Population (2020)
  - Total: 368
  - Density: 49.9/km^{2} (129/sq mi)

Žerjav (pronounced [ʒɛˈɾjau̯]) is a settlement on the Meža River northeast of Črna na Koroškem in the Carinthia region in northern Slovenia.
