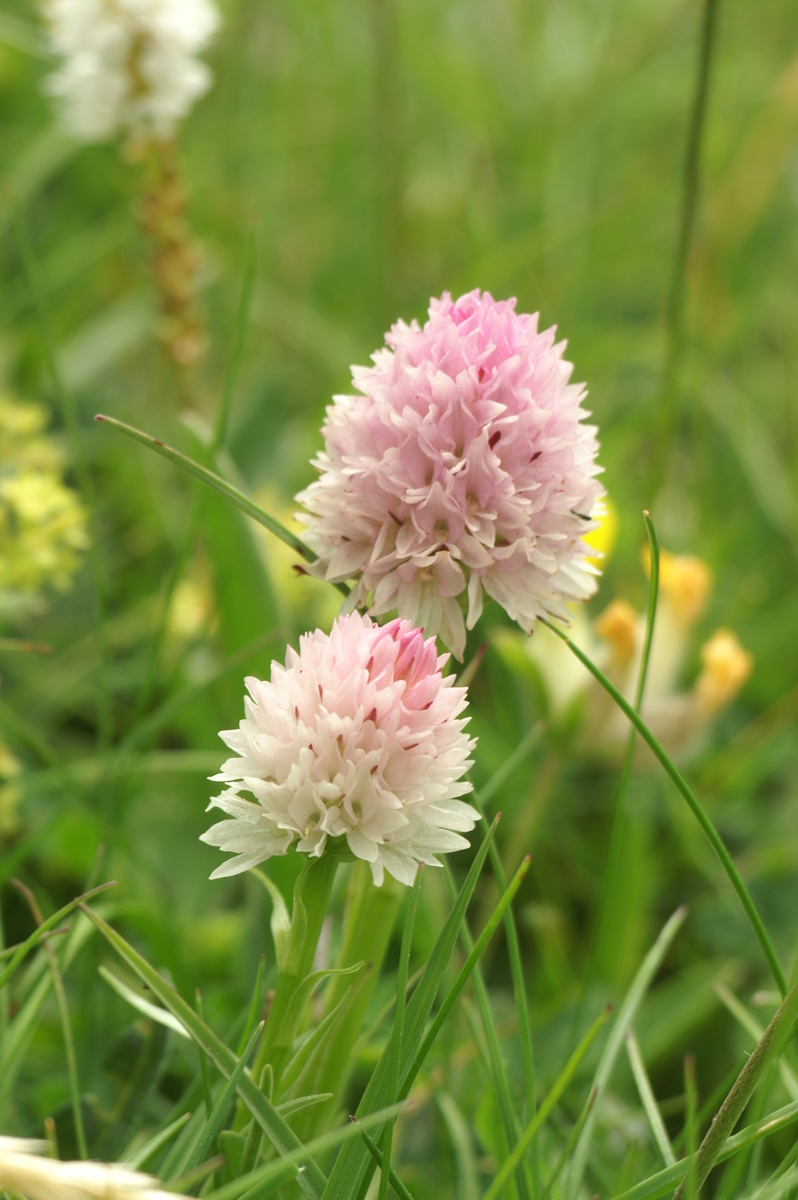

Conservation status
- Endangered (IUCN 3.1)

Scientific classification
- Kingdom: Plantae
- Clade: Tracheophytes
- Clade: Angiosperms
- Clade: Monocots
- Order: Asparagales
- Family: Orchidaceae
- Subfamily: Orchidoideae
- Genus: Gymnadenia
- Species: G. lithopolitanica

Binomial name
- Gymnadenia lithopolitanica (Ravnik) Teppner & E.Klein, 1998

Synonyms
- Nigritella lithopolitanica Ravnik; Nigritella nigra subsp. lithopolitanica (Ravnik) H.Baumann & R.Lorenz

= Gymnadenia lithopolitanica =

Species of flowering plant

Gymandenia lithopolitanica, the Austrian gymnadenia, is a species of orchid endemic to a portion of the eastern Alps spanning Austria and Slovenia.

== Description ==
Gymandenia lithopolitanica have a short and dense inflorescence in a spherical or dome to slightly oval shape. The flower color is from an intense pink to pink to slightly purplish pink and very light pink. Lowermost flowers get lighter and are almost white when the plant is in full bloom. The color of the buds is darker than that of the flowers. They bloom from June to mid July.

== Distribution ==
Gymandenia lithopolitanica populations have been found in southern Austria in the states of Carinthia and Styria and in northern Slovenia. They are endemic to an area of the eastern Alps encompassing the mountain ranges of Kamnik–Savinja Alps, Koralpe and Karawanken.

== Taxonomy ==
The first mention of what was likely Gymnadenia lithpolitanica is a note by Franz Xaver Wulfen from 1783 about pink vanilla orchids. After being treated as variation or subspecies for centuries in 1978 Vlado Ravnik described it as a full species. Teppner & E.Klein moved it to its current genus in 1998.
