= Poljče, Radovljica =

Poljče
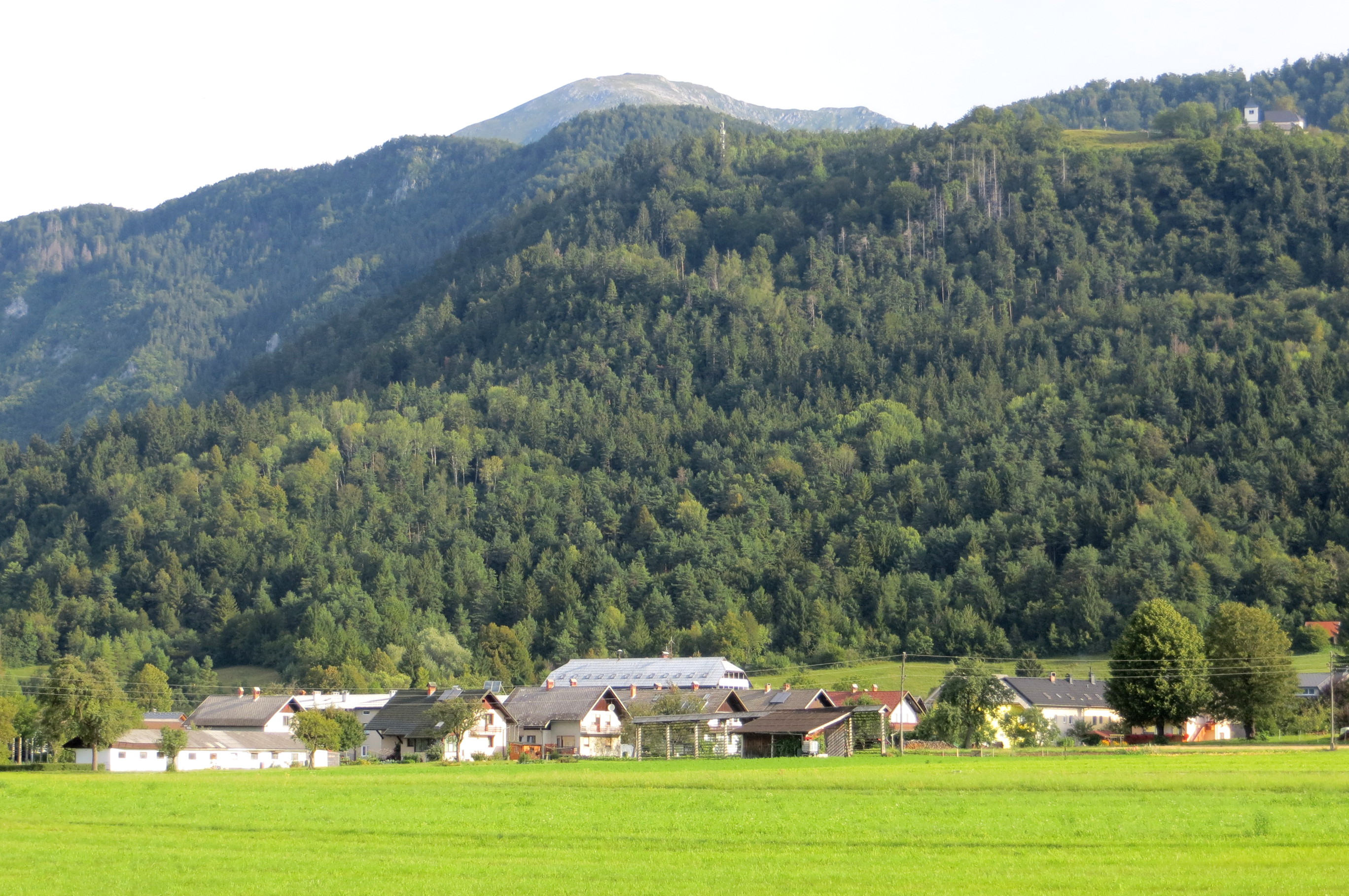

- Location in Slovenia
- Coordinates: 46°22′32.11″N 14°11′30.69″E
- Country: Slovenia
- Region: Upper Carniola
- Statistical region: Upper Carniola
- Municipality: Radovljica

Area
  - Land: 4.26 km^{2} (1.64 sq mi)
- Elevation: 554.9 m (1,821 ft)

Population (2024)
  - Total: 210

Poljče (pronounced [ˈpoːltʃɛ]) is a village near Begunje in the Municipality of Radovljica in the Upper Carniola region of Slovenia.
