= King Matjaž =

Legendary king in some Eastern European countries

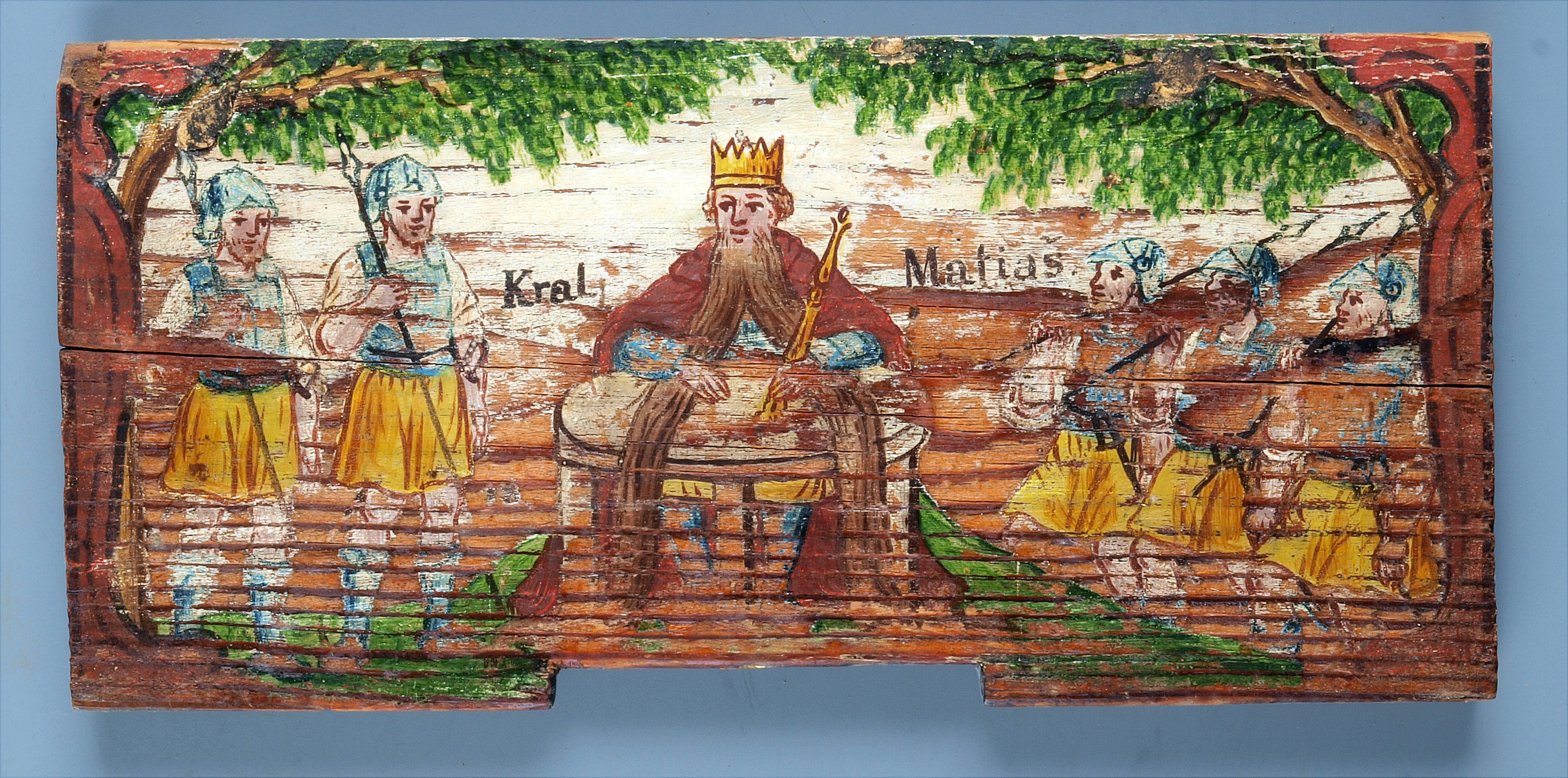
1877 beehive panel painting of King Matjaž

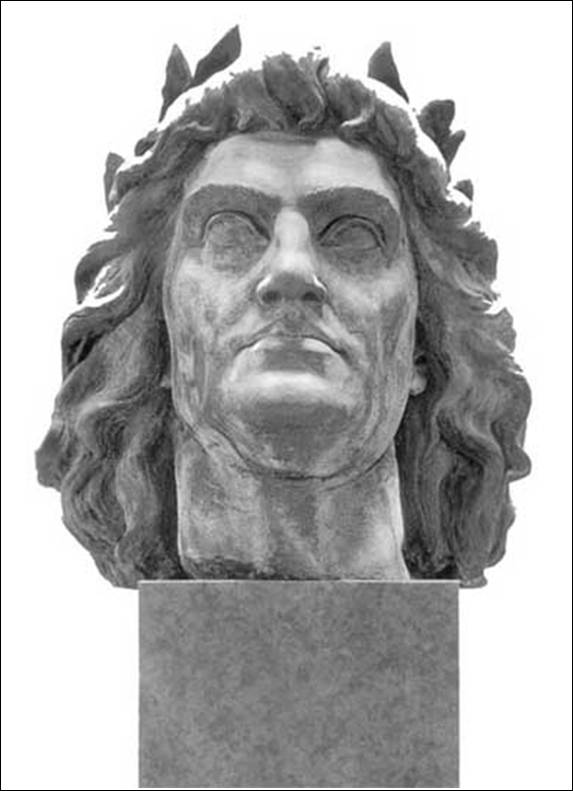
Matthias Corvinus, about fifty years old (contemporary sculpture from Buda Castle)

King Matjaž/Mátyás/Matijaš (Slovene: Kralj Matjaž, Hungarian: Mátyás király, Croatian: Kralj Matijaš) is a legendary king in Slovenia, Hungary, Croatia and in some other countries, based on pre-Christian traditions of Carantania and in the course of the centuries gradually linked to a real-life king, Matthias Corvinus of Hungary, who lived in the second half of the 15th century. He has also been linked to the leader of the peasant's army that fought against the Turks in the Battle of Kokovo in July 1478. A number of folk poems and stories about King Matjaž are known, the earliest ones originating in the western Slovene area of Tolmin from the 16th century. He is mainly represented as the king who is just and a defender of his people, and the bringer of the golden age of prosperity. It has been assumed that the legend was the basis for the name of the 1573 peasants' revolt leader Matija Gubec, actually named Ambrož Gubec.

== Content of the poems and stories ==
The folk poems tell about King Matjaž's fights with the Turks, about the kidnapping of his wife Alenčica, or his rescue from the Turkish jail. The stories about King Matjaž are arrangements of the poems or may have a different content. In this case, they tell about the King's rebellion against God and about his army, buried under a mountain.

== Traditions and memorials ==
The traditions related to King Matjaž have a significant role in the Slovenian Carinthia, particularly the Črna Valley, where a competition in building snow castles as well as visual art and literary writing related to King Matjaž has taken place every January since 1993. This is related to a story according to which King Matjaž sleeps in the Peca Mountain above the valley. In the vicinity of the Peca hut, there is a bronze sculpture of King Matjaž at the beginning of an abandoned pit. It was designed by the sculptor and mountaineer Marjan Keršič in 1958, put to bronze by the sculptor France Rotar, and placed in the cave in 1962.

In the mid-1990s, King Matjaž was depicted on the King of Diamonds card of the Slovene Tarock. The depiction was based on a study led by the ethnologist Janez Bogataj, and the card was drawn by the academy-trained painter and illustrator Matjaž Schmidt.

In 2006, the Slovenian country musician Milan Pečovnik, a.k.a. "Pidži," spotted the image of King Matjaž carved into the rocks of Mount Peca.

Turkish writer and poet M. Bahadırhan Dinçaslan's narrative poem "Kuzgunların Kralı" (The King of the Ravens) depicts Matthias Corvinus as a sleeping king, whose sculpture is animated every night and wanders an unknown town.
