= Petzen =

Mountain on Austria–Slovenia border

- Peca
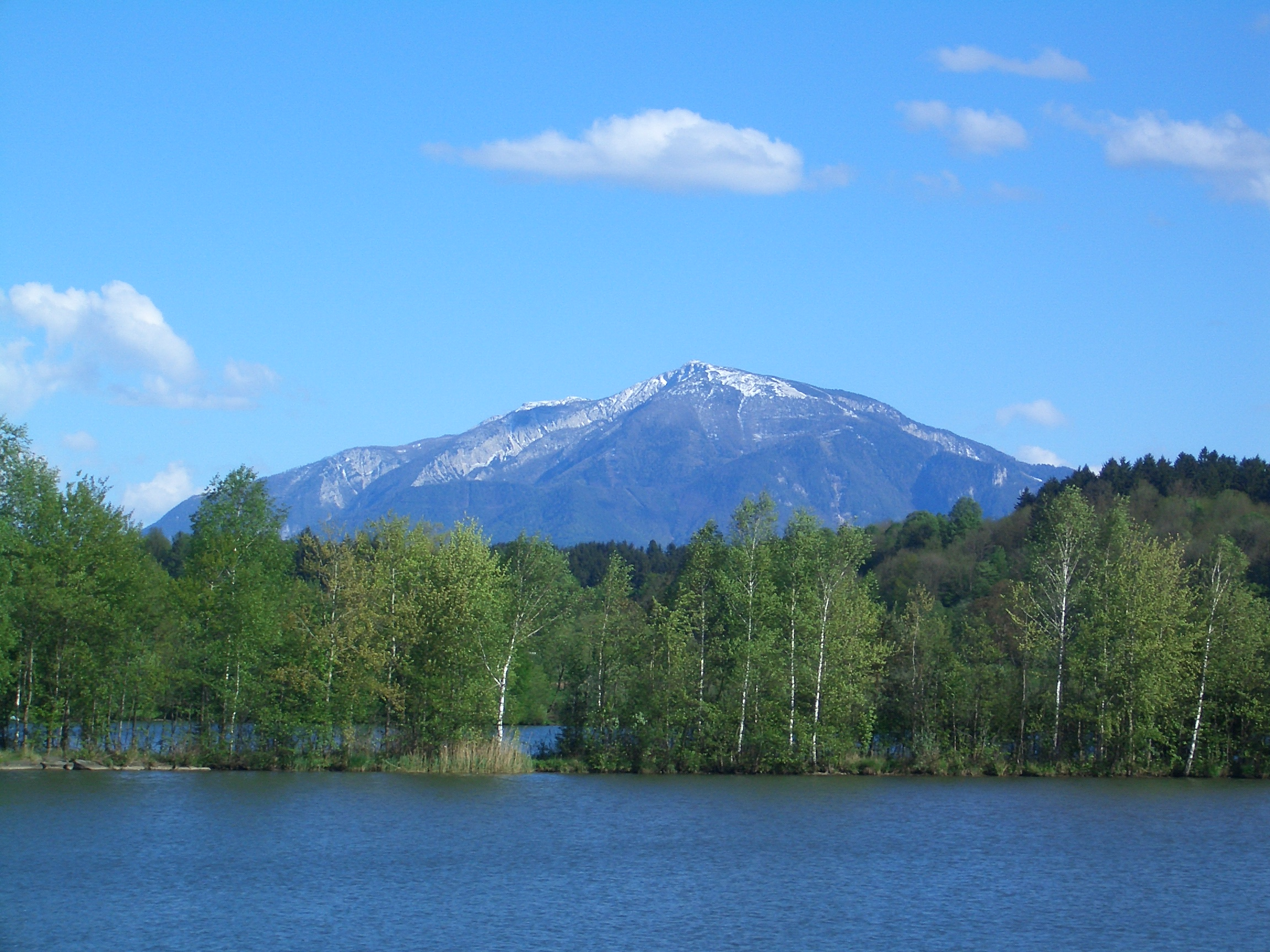
- Petzen, seen from the northwest

Highest point
- Elevation: 2,126 m (6,975 ft)
- Prominence: 882 m (2,894 ft)
- Coordinates: 46°30′N 14°47′E

Geography
- Location within Alps Location within Austria Location within Slovenia
- Location: Austria / Slovenia
- Parent range: Karawanks

Petzen (German) or Peca (Slovene) is the highest mountain of the eastern Karawanks, the second-highest mountain of the Northern Karawanks and the most eastern two-thousand-metre mountain of Slovenia. It is a mighty mountain with a characteristic shape of a tableland with rocky peaks protruding from it. The mountain borders the Meža Valley and the Topla Valley to the south and east, and the Jaun Valley to the north, and is separated by the narrow valley of the Bela Creek from Hochobir. Two thirds of the mountain lies in Austria, and one third in Slovenia. The mountain reaches its highest elevation on the mountain crest of the Kordež Head (Slovene: Kordeževa Glava, German: Kordeschkopf, 2,125 metres or 6,972 feet). The border runs across it.

The mountain is built of Triassic Wetterstein limestone and Wetterstein dolomite. In the past, lead and zinc was mined on Peca, the shafts belonging to the Topla and Mežica mines. The lead-zinc ore occurs in Middle to Upper Triassic carbonate rocks deposited in an anoxic supratidal marine environment, similar to other Mississippi Valley-type lead-zinc ores. In addition to the ore, several rare minerals were discovered underground in the mountain, such as wulfenite and calcite. A mine on the mountain is accessible to mountain bikes.

The lower slopes on the Slovenian side are forested, whereas the higher slopes are home to a variety of Alpine flora, including several species of flowers

A mountain hut was built at Little Peca (Slovene: Mala Peca; 1,665 metres or 5,463 feet) in 1928, which was burnt down during World War II, and rebuilt in 1957. Since 1936, the chapel of Sts. Cyril and Methodius stands next to it. The beginning of an abandoned pit, named Matjaž Cave after King Matjaž, is situated in the vicinity, which is a historical monument. Inside it, there is a bronze statue of the sleeping king. The statue was designed in 1958 by the sculptor and mountaineer Marjan Keršič, cast in bronze by the sculptor France Rotar, and placed in the cave in 1962.
