= Battle of Kokovo =

Military battle in 1478

Date	June 26, 1478
Location	Coccau, near Tarvisio, Italy
Result	Ottoman victory

Belligerents
Peasant army of the Carinthian Farmer's League	Ottoman Turkish raiding army

Commanders and leaders
Matjaž †	Unknown

Strength
~600 peasants and miners	

Casualties and losses
All 600 killed	Unknown

The Battle of Kokovo was fought in the fields near the village of Kokovo (present-day Coccau in Italy) (German: Goggau) on 26 June 1478 between an army of 600 peasants and miners from Carinthia against a 20,000-strong Ottoman Turkish invading army. The peasant army was raised in the context of the Carinthian peasant revolt of 1478.

== Origins ==
Carinthia saw five Turkish raids into its territory between 1473 and 1483, with much plundering and killing at the hands of Turkish cavalry. Because the local nobility had no answer to the large numbers of mobile Turkish cavalry, they moved into their fortified castles, while the clergy fortified its churches and monasteries and held out there. This left most peasants in Carinthia without any protection, even though they were burdened with special taxes to fight the Turks.

== Battle details ==
In order to protect themselves from the Turkish invaders, around 3,000 peasants and miners took up arms, preparing to fight the Turkish army coming via the Predil Pass. However, upon arrival of the Turkish army, most of the original 3,000 peasants fled into the forests leaving only around 600 farmers under a certain Matjaž who refused to let the Turks pass without a fight. In the ensuing battle that pitted the poorly armed, but determined peasants against professional Turkish Akinci cavalrymen, all 600 peasants and miners were killed. The Turkish army then continued its advance and eventually plundered areas up until Upper Carinthia.

The battle spawned a myth among the people of Carniola that the 600 peasants and their "king" Matjaž did not die, but actually sheltered in nearby Mount St. Ursula and are sleeping there. They will wake up once the king's beard has encircled the stone table by which he rests nine times, after which he will walk outside and happy times will come for the Carniolans.
