= Nadina Abarth-Žerjav =

Daughter of Gregor Žerjav

Nadina Abarth-Žerjav (née Nada Žerjav) (March 5, 1912, Gorizia / Gorica – September 16, 2000, Ljubljana) was the daughter of the known Slovene politician and lawyer minister Gregor Žerjav and his wife, Milena née Lavrenčič. Her younger brother was Borut Žerjav (1916–1977), a journalist in Trieste and Paris after the Second World War. Her twin sister was Tatjana, who died young from tuberculosis (in 1943).

Žerjav spent her early childhood in Graz and Ljubljana. Because her father, a politician, was preventively arrested and imprisoned during World War I in Ljubljana Castle and in Graz by the Austro-Hungarian authorities for his "notorious pro-Serbian attitudes", she lived for some time with her maternal grandparents. After the early death of both her parents from tuberculosis in 1929, she was educated in Munich and Paris. She spoke seven languages. Later she lived in Ljubljana. One of her close friends there was the painter Zoran Mušič. Nada travelled with him to Korčula and Cavtat in 1940. She was wounded in the time of the war, during the murder of a banker and businessman Avgust Praprotnik in Ljubljana on February 20, 1942.

On November 28, 1949, Žerjav married Carlo Abarth, the well-known Turin automobile industrialist. Abarth-Žerjav and Carlo Abarth met in 1944 at Lake Garda in Italy. They may have even met earlier, during the war in Ljubljana, because Abarth lived there for several years. He worked at Vok, a small local factory. Abarth-Zerjav supported her husband during the founding period of the Abarth works, and also in every possible way later on. She initiated contact with Tazio Nuvolari, which became important during the first years of the existence of the Squadra Abarth. Her knowledge of languages enabled her to engage in public relations in foreign countries as well. Even after their divorce in 1979, she remained on friendly terms with Carlo Abarth, and after his death she continued to admire him greatly. The couple had no children.

After the breakup of Yugoslavia in 1991, Abarth-Žerjav, who had Italian citizenship since 1949, applied for Slovenian citizenship and finally received it in 1997 in consideration of her family's history.

Abarth-Žerjav lived in Turin for over 50 years and was well known there. She left Turin in November 1999 because of ill health and moved in with her nephew's family in Ljubljana, where she died on September 16, 2000. She was buried five days later at her family's gravesite, a protected monument in Žale Cemetery in Ljubljana.
