= Marjan Keršič =

Slovenian sculptor history

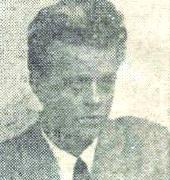
Marjan Keršič

Marjan Keršič aka Belač (Slovene: Marjan Keršič - Belač) (18 May 1920 – 3 June 2003) was a Slovenian sculptor and mountaineer.

== Sculpture ==
Keršič was a student of Boris Kalin. He graduated in 1949 at the Ljubljana Academy of Arts. From 1962 to 1966 he taught sculpture at the School of Visual Design in Ljubljana. His first works can be classified as typical of Social Realism (a monument to the Slovene National Liberation Struggle in Planina pri Rakeku, 1953). Later he continued in a moderate Realism (Aleš Bebler Monument in Nova Gorica, 1981).

== Mountaineering ==
In August 1960, Keršič was part of the JAHO I expedition, the first Yugoslav mountaineering expedition to the Himalayas. They ascended Trisul III (6,007 metres or 19,708 feet).
