= Slovene peasant revolt of 1515 =

Peasant revolt in present-day Slovenia

Slovene Peasant Revolt
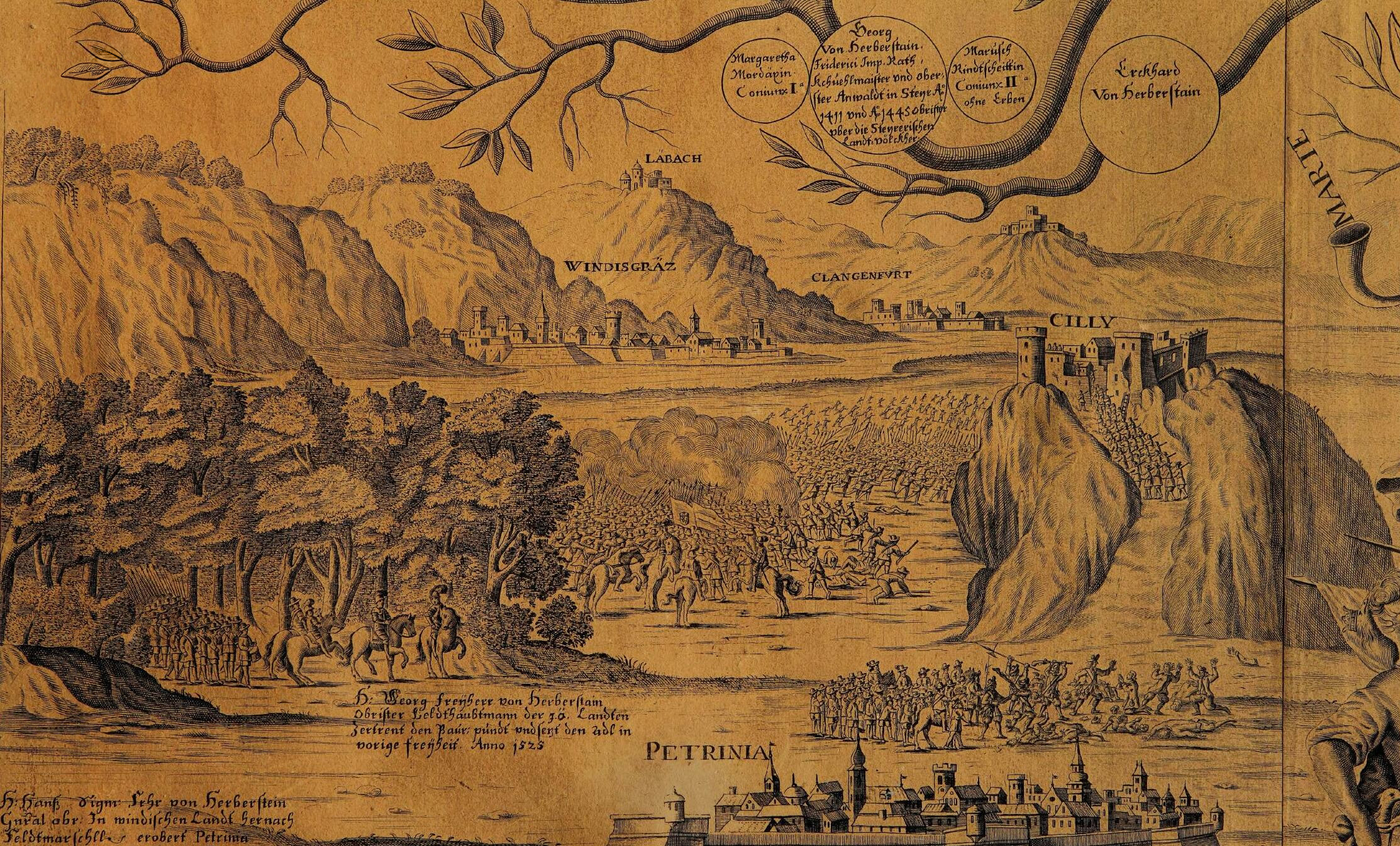
- A 1715 depiction of the revolt in Celje in 1515
| Date | March–August 1515 |
| Location | Carniola, Habsburg monarchy |
| Result | Rebellion suppressed |

Belligerents
| Peasants | Nobles |

Commanders and leaders
| Klander | Sigmund von Dietrichstein |

Strength
| Approximately 80,000 peasants | Nobles, soldiers, including German mercenaries |

Casualties and losses
| More than 2,000 | Unknown |

The Slovene peasant revolt (Slovene: slovenski kmečki upor, German: Windischer Bauernkrieg), also known as the all-Slovene peasant uprising (vseslovenski kmečki upor), took place in 1515. The largest peasant revolt in the Slovene Lands, it started in Carniola in what is now Slovenia. About 80,000 rebels demanded the reintroduction of the original feudal obligations and trade rights (the so-called "old rights"; Slovene: stara pravda), and a right to decide about the taxes. The spark which started this uprising was when magistrates imprisoned and executed a delegation of ethnic German peasants of the Gottschee region that complained to their landlord, Jörg von Thurn. In return, a popular uprising killed von Thurn and the revolt spread to other regions. The revolt was put down by an army that included mercenaries of the Holy Roman Empire, with the deciding battle fought at Cilli. The event is an important part of Slovenian national identity as the first example of the Slovene language written down is the phrase Slovene: stara pravda, included in a poem written by a German mercenary who fought in the revolt.

== Background ==
The Slovene peasant revolt, (Slovene: slovenski kmečki upor, German: Windischer Bauernbund), also known as the all-slovene peasant uprising (vseslovenski kmečki upor), did not happen in a vacuum. At the beginning of the sixteenth century, the traditional feudal system in Europe was breaking down. The impact of the new mechanism of war was particularly felt by the peasants, those who cultivated land own by their liege, who not only were called upon to fight in war but also suffered most from the taxes that were levied to support war. This was the case in the lands of the Habsburg monarchy under Maximilian I, whose constant war led to increased taxes. This was particularly a problem for the people of Lower Carniola, in present-day Slovenia, who were also subject to attack from the Ottoman Empire and, within that region, rural peasants, as there was no significant tax regime from the underdeveloped towns, and the consequent trade income, in the area.

The main complaint surrounded the landsteur, a general tax that was sent to the emperor. The tax collectors were generally detested such that, in 1512, delegates from Carniola at the parliament in Graz declared that they would rely on the emperor on enforcing payment rather than it being up to the local nobility. This led to even greater complaints from the peasantry and a series of small uprisings, each put down with force by the local nobility in 1513 and 1514. The peasants petitioned the emperor, requesting the resumption of their previous feudal obligations and trade rights (the so-called "old rights" or Slovene: stara pravda), and a right to decide about the taxes.

== Conflict ==
The trigger for the revolt was the work of the Jörg von Thurn, who, when he acquired a landowner's estate as security, imposed an ever-increasing level of financial burden on his tenants, without awareness of their increasing poverty. In this, he was aided by a steward, Johannes Stersen. Von Thurn had been made responsible for Gottschee by Maximillian in 1507, but his actions had wider repercussions. When the peasants complained, the magistrates locked up their spokesperson and then executed them. In response, in either late February or early March 1515, the ethically-German Gottscheerish-speaking peasants of Gottschee rose up and killed both von Thurn and Stersen.

The revolt spread quickly. On 29 March, the peasants of the Wochein petitioned the lord of Veldes, the Bishop of Brixen, asking for relief from statutory labour, increased taxes and other new impositions. They claimed support from over 20,000 people, including citizens from nearby Krainburg and Radmannsdorf. They were soon joined by people from Eisnern. Leaders emerged, including a man named Zuzak and a tailor from Radmannsdorf. The most charismatic of the leaders was named Klander, who claimed that the Holy Spirit spoke to him and consecrated crossed and icons on poles that were carried by the peasants. Soon the revolt numbered 80,000 people, the largest revolt in the Slovene Lands.

After the inaugural bloodshed, the revolt was initially mainly peaceful. On 4 April, the nobility presented a proposition to the Bishop of Gurk, the emperor's representative, requesting a senior delegation to negotiate with the revolutionaries. The peasants sent a delegation to the emperor in Augsburg, and he agreed that if they laid down their arms he would require the nobility to remove the "innovations" to which they objected. In July, he sent negotiators to discuss terms with them too, although the lack of a leader of the revolt hindered negotiations.

Before this could take place, violence broke out, and quickly spread. The peasants were successful in taking a number of poorly-armed castles, including Machau Castle on 15 May, followed by others, including Arch, Billichgraz, Nassenfuss, Ruckenstein, Rudolfseck, Sverstein, Thurn am Hart and Zobelsberg. In response, the nobility fought back. The Landeshauptmann of Styria, Sigmund von Dietrichstein brought an army of 850 horseman, eight troops of foot soldiers and artillery, including a number of mercenaries of the Holy Roman Empire. He attacked the peasants near Cilli. The rebels fled and were either killed or subsequently executed, with at least 2,000 casualties being reported. The revolt collapsed. By August, the revolt had been put down.

== Legacy ==
The revolt has been a crucial part of Slovene consciousness. The first printed Slovene words, Slovene: stara pravda, were printed in 1515 in Vienna in a poem of the German mercenaries that served in the war. The revolt formed an important part of the national narrative in 1918 when the country was being defined after the dissolution of Austria-Hungary. The narrative of a Slovenian peasantry fighting against a German-speaking nobility formed an important part of national identity. This is now being challenged, as language was not a factor in the revolt, many of the peasants being Gottscheerish-speaking Gottscheers and the increasing understanding that Slovenian national identity includes speakers of many languages.
