= Črna na Koroškem =

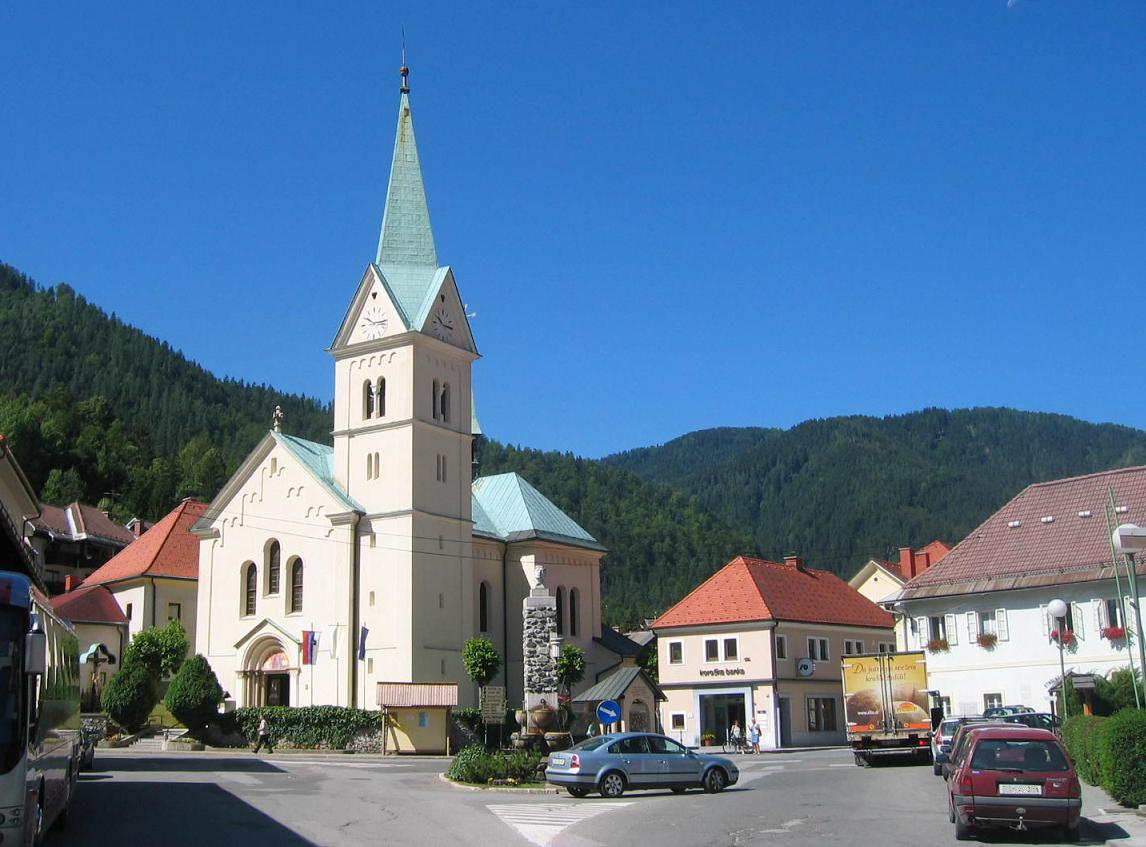
- Main square

- Location in Slovenia
- Coordinates: 46°28′11.07″N 14°50′56.27″E
- Country: Slovenia
- Traditional region: Carinthia
- Statistical region: Carinthia
- Municipality: Črna na Koroškem

Area
  - Total: 7.5 km^{2} (2.9 sq mi)
- Elevation: 581.2 m (1,907 ft)

Population (2020)
  - Total: 2,201
  - Density: 290/km^{2} (760/sq mi)
- Postal code: 2393 Črna na Koroškem

Črna na Koroškem (pronounced [ˈtʃə́ɾna na kɔˈɾóːʃkɛm]; German: Schwarzenbach) is a town in northern Slovenia. It is the seat of the Municipality of Črna na Koroškem. It lies in the traditional Slovenian province of Carinthia, close to the border with Austria. Since 2005 it has been part of the larger Carinthia Statistical Region.

== Name ==
The settlement was first attested in written sources in 1309 under the German name Swarzenpach (and as Swartzenpach in 1318 and Swarczenpach in 1470)—all literally 'black creek'. The Slovene name Črna (literally, 'black') arose through ellipsis from *Črna (voda/reka) 'Black Creek'. The designation "black" may have referred to water with dark silt, water that flowed through a spruce woods, or deep water with no visible bottom. The stream in question is known as Javorje Creek (Slovene: Javorski potok) today. The name of the settlement was changed from Črna to Črna na Koroškem in 1970. In the past the German name was Schwarzenbach.

== History ==
A chapel at Črna in the Duchy of Carinthia was first mentioned in an 1137 deed. The settlement has a long ironworking history. A foundry was established by one Mehior Puc, who moved to Črna from the Lavant Valley in 1620, started mining iron ore and built two smelting furnaces, which were among the first in the Eastern Alps. This operation was sold to the Counts of Thurn-Valsassina from nearby Bleiburg in 1624, who built a new ironworking operation on the Meža River at Mušenik to the north of the town in the 18th century. After the Austrian Southern Railway company had built a railway connection to Klagenfurt and Villach at Ravne na Koroškem a few miles down the Meža River, the Counts of Thurn moved operations there and abandoned their ironworks in Črna around 1880.

== Church ==
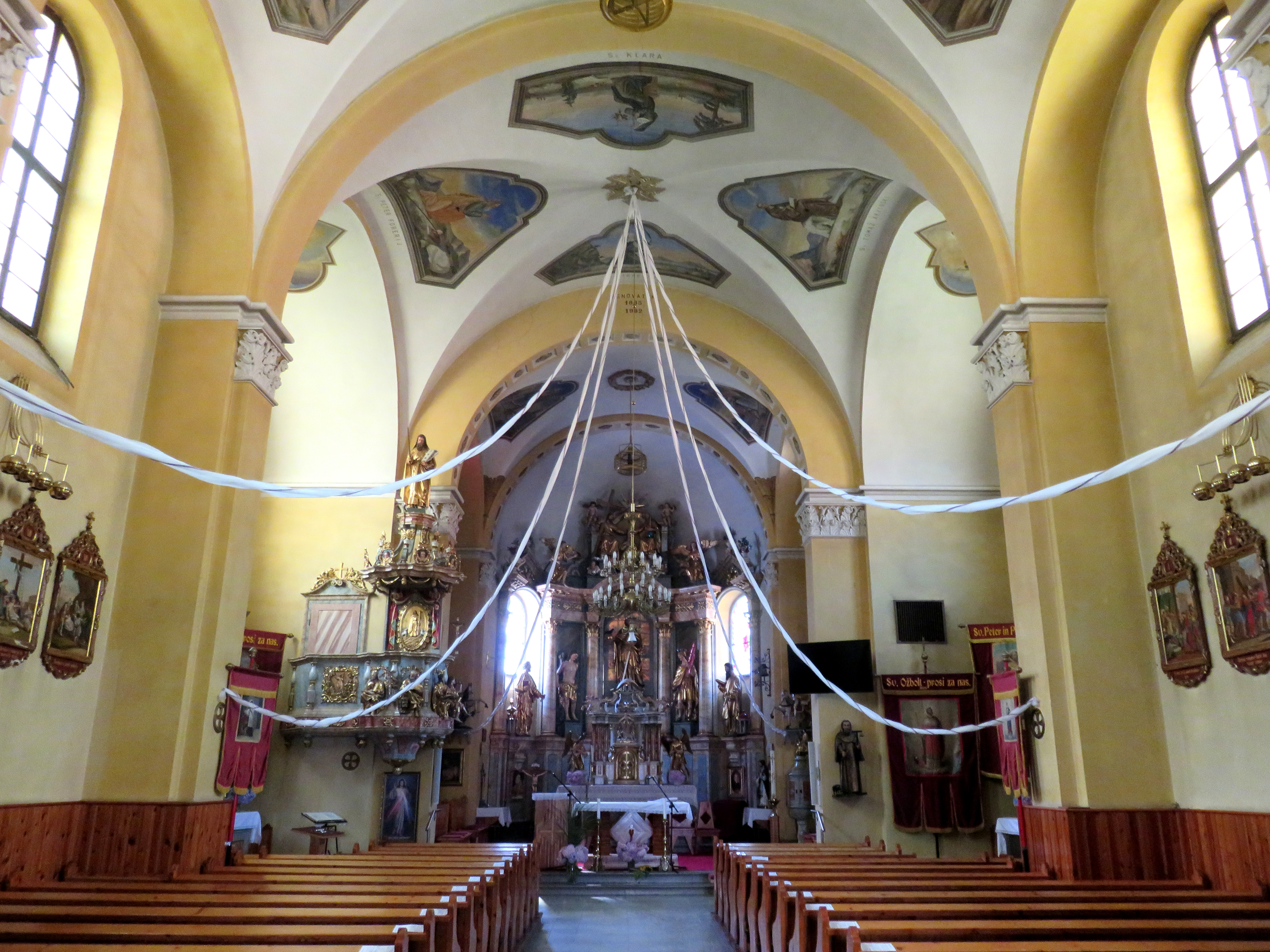
Interior of Saint Oswald's Church

The parish church in the town is dedicated to Saint Oswald. It is a Neo-Romanesque building that was erected in 1868 after the old church burned down in a fire.

== Notable people ==
Notable people that were born or lived in Črna na Koroškem include:

- Aleš Gorza (born 1980), skier
- Mitja Kunc (born 1971), skier
- Nataša Lačen (born 1971), skier
- Maksimilijan Matjaž (born 1963), Roman Catholic bishop
- Tina Maze (born 1983), skier
- Irma Pavlinič-Krebs (born 1963), politician
- Miro Petek (born 1959), journalist and politician
- Danilo Pudgar (born 1952), skier
- Drago Pudgar (born 1949), skier
- Katjuša Pušnik (born 1969), skier
