= Lake Klopein =

Lake in Carinthia, Austria

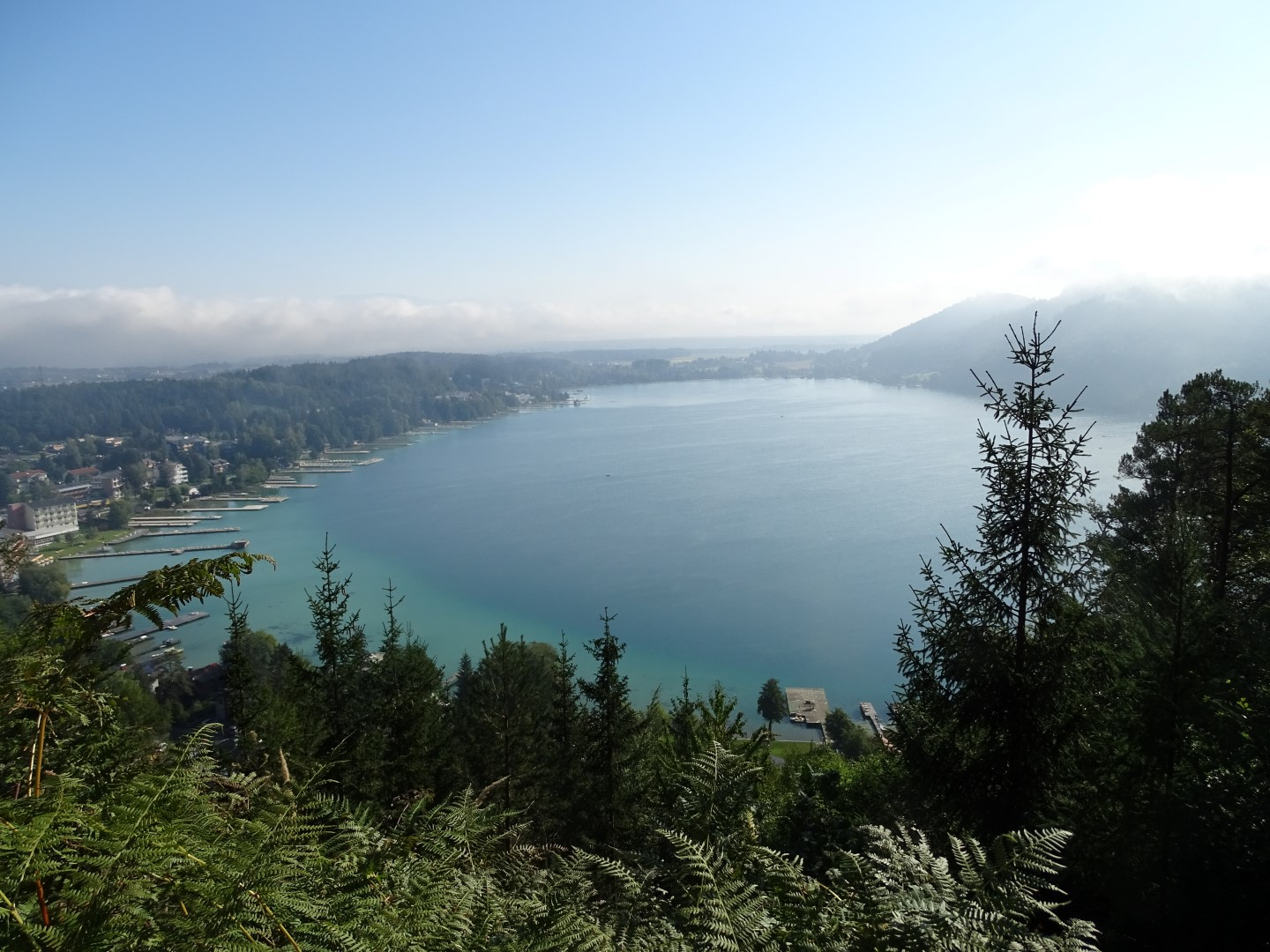

- Location within Austria
- Location: Carinthia
- Coordinates: 46°36′16″N 14°34′59″E
- Catchment area: 4.14 km^{2} (1.60 sq mi)
- Basin countries: Austria
- Surface area: 1.1 km^{2} (0.42 sq mi)
- Average depth: 23 m (75 ft)
- Max. depth: 48 m (157 ft)
- Water volume: 25,422,734 m^{3} (20,600 acre⋅ft)
- Residence time: 11.5 years
- Surface elevation: 446 m (1,463 ft)
- Settlements: Sankt Kanzian

Lake Klopein (German: Klopeiner See, Slovene: Klopinjsko jezero) is a lake near the town of Völkermarkt located within the municipality of Sankt Kanzian in Carinthia, Austria. Lake Klopein is the remaining lake of previously larger lake area, which has spanned over today's Kühnsdorf area. With water temperatures reaching 29 °C it is among the warmest lakes in the Alpine region.

== Geological structure ==
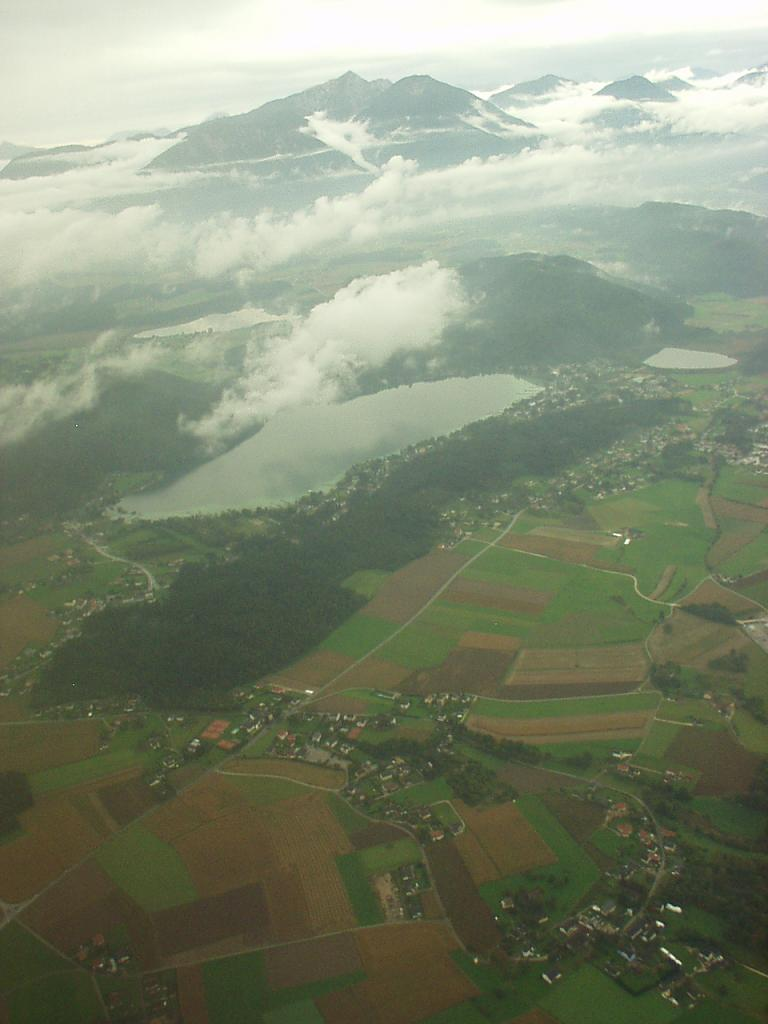
Lake Klopein and Kleinsee

Lake Klopein is mostly a still lake. Only a few little streams are flowing into it. The result is a very high water temperature, reaching up to 29 °C . The outgoing stream is on the west side and flows inside the river Drava. Lake Klopein is 1800 Meters long, 800 Meters wide and has the deepest depth of 48 Meters. Average depth is at 23 Meters.

Because of the rare water influx from the rivers, the Sankt Kanzian municipality is taking great care about preserving the water quality. Since the 1980s when the lake used to be biologically contaminated they managed to add different channels to ventilate the lake. Since 1975 the lake is being filled up through a deep-water installation with additional oxygen. In the 1930s the water circulation reached the depths of 40 Meters, but today the water only circulates until 30 Meters, therefore it requires technical assistance.

A bit smaller Turnersee and also 13 Meters deep lake is known for its high temperatures. It lies about 2 Kilometres further from Lake Klopein and also belongs to municipality of Sankt Kanzian. A popular fishing point is also Kleinsee, which is located on the north of Lake Klopein.

== Tourism ==
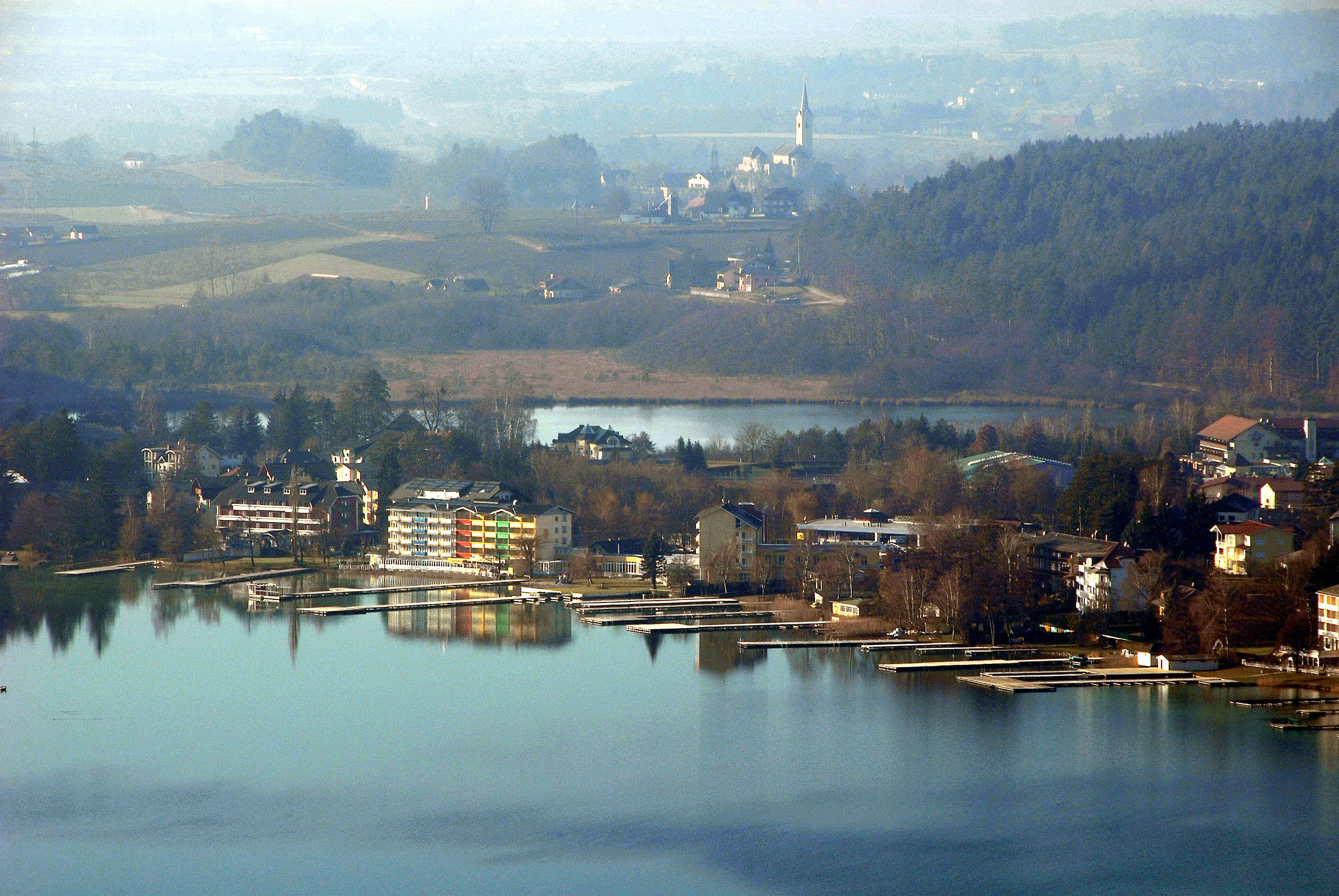
Klopein lakeside, with Kleinsee in the background

Lake Klopein is a popular tourist destination, therefore hotels and swimming places span around the whole lake area. Most of the swimming areas are private and available only to hotel guests. There are also some public swimming areas, which are equipped with small restaurants.

In the beginning of year 1885 first guests arrived at Lake Klopein, where they offered 40 beds. It was known as a recovery area for lung related illnesses. Until the 1970s the area became more popular as a tourist destination, which has been divided in three areas - Sommerfrischen Klopein (Nordufer), Seelach (Nordwestecke) and Unterburg (Südostecke). Today these three areas are binding together, where the centre of the tourism is in the area of Seelach.

== Fish species ==
In Lake Klopein 15 different sorts of fish can be found (Statistic review from 2004) :

- Coregonus lavaretus
- Salmo trutta lacustris
- Esox lucius
- Silurus glanis
- Anguilla anguilla
- Leuciscus cephalus
- Ctenopharyngodon idella
- Abramis brama
- Cyprinus carpio
- Alburnus alburnus
- Rutilus rutilus
- Scardinius erythrophthalmus
- Tinca tinca
- Perca fluviatilis
- Sander lucioperca
