= Aviary =

Large enclosure for confining birds

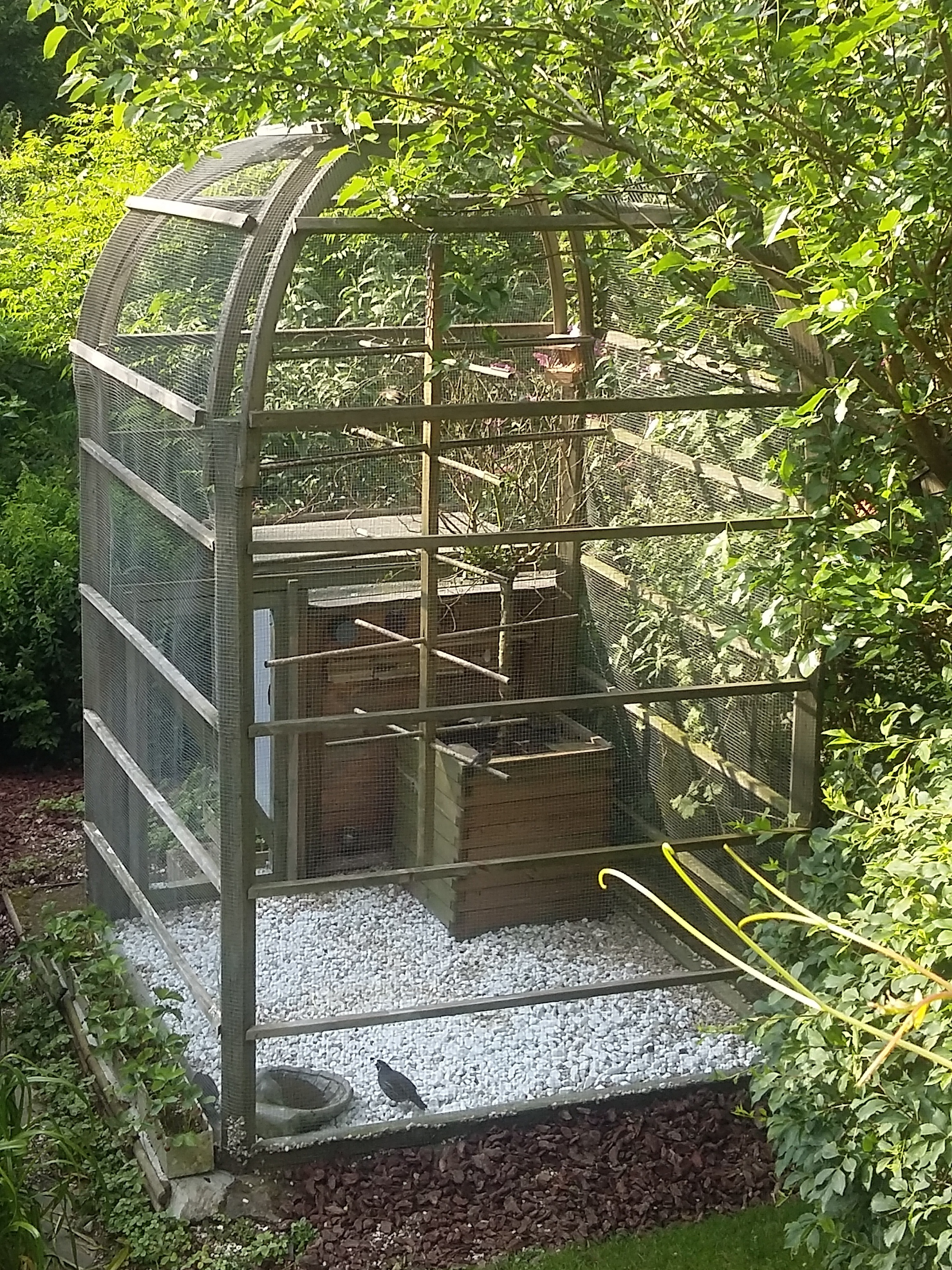
Home aviary, Néthen, Belgium, non-commercial wooden construction

An aviary is a large enclosure for confining birds, although bats may also be considered for display. Unlike birdcages, aviaries allow birds a larger living space where they can fly; hence, aviaries are also sometimes known as flight cages in the United Kingdom. Aviaries often contain plants and shrubbery to simulate a natural environment.

== Various types of aviary ==
Large aviaries are often found in zoological gardens (for example, the London Zoo, the National Zoo in Washington, D.C., and the San Diego Zoo). Walk-in aviaries also exist in bird parks, including the spacious Bird Paradise in Singapore, or the smaller Edward Youde Aviary in Hong Kong. Pittsburgh is home to the USA's National Aviary, perhaps the most prominent example in North America of an aviary not set inside a zoo. However, the oldest public aviary not set inside a zoo in North America, the Hamilton Aviary is located in Hamilton, Ontario, Canada. Tracy Aviary is an example of a bird park within a public urban park, Liberty Park in Salt Lake City, Utah. Some smaller sized aviaries can often be found in European manorial gardens, such as Waddesdon Manor, UK, and Versailles, France. Some public aquaria, such as the Oregon Coast Aquarium, Newport, Oregon, or the Monterey Bay Aquarium, have aquatic aviaries.

Home aviaries are popular with some bird fanciers who have the space for them. Many bird breeders refer to their setups as "aviaries", since most bird pairs breed better there than in breeding cages. Home aviaries may be built by the owner or obtained from a commercial supplier.

There are two main subcategories of home aviaries: grounded aviaries and suspended aviaries. Grounded aviaries have a concrete base to keep out rats and other vermin. Suspended aviaries are elevated with only the 'legs' of the aviaries affixed to the ground, eliminating the need for a protective base. Most grounded aviaries typically feature a woodwork or PVC frame unlike the metal frame of public aviaries; however, it isn't uncommon for suspended aviaries to feature a metal frame. Aviaries are also used for research purposes in ornithology institutes.

== History ==
=== Early modern origins ===
Aviaries date back to at least the 1500s, possibly earlier, as found in the Aztec city of Tenochtitlan as noted by Hernán Cortés when he and his men arrived in 1521. Also the Raven Cage (created in 1829), is regarded as one of the oldest structures in the London Zoo.

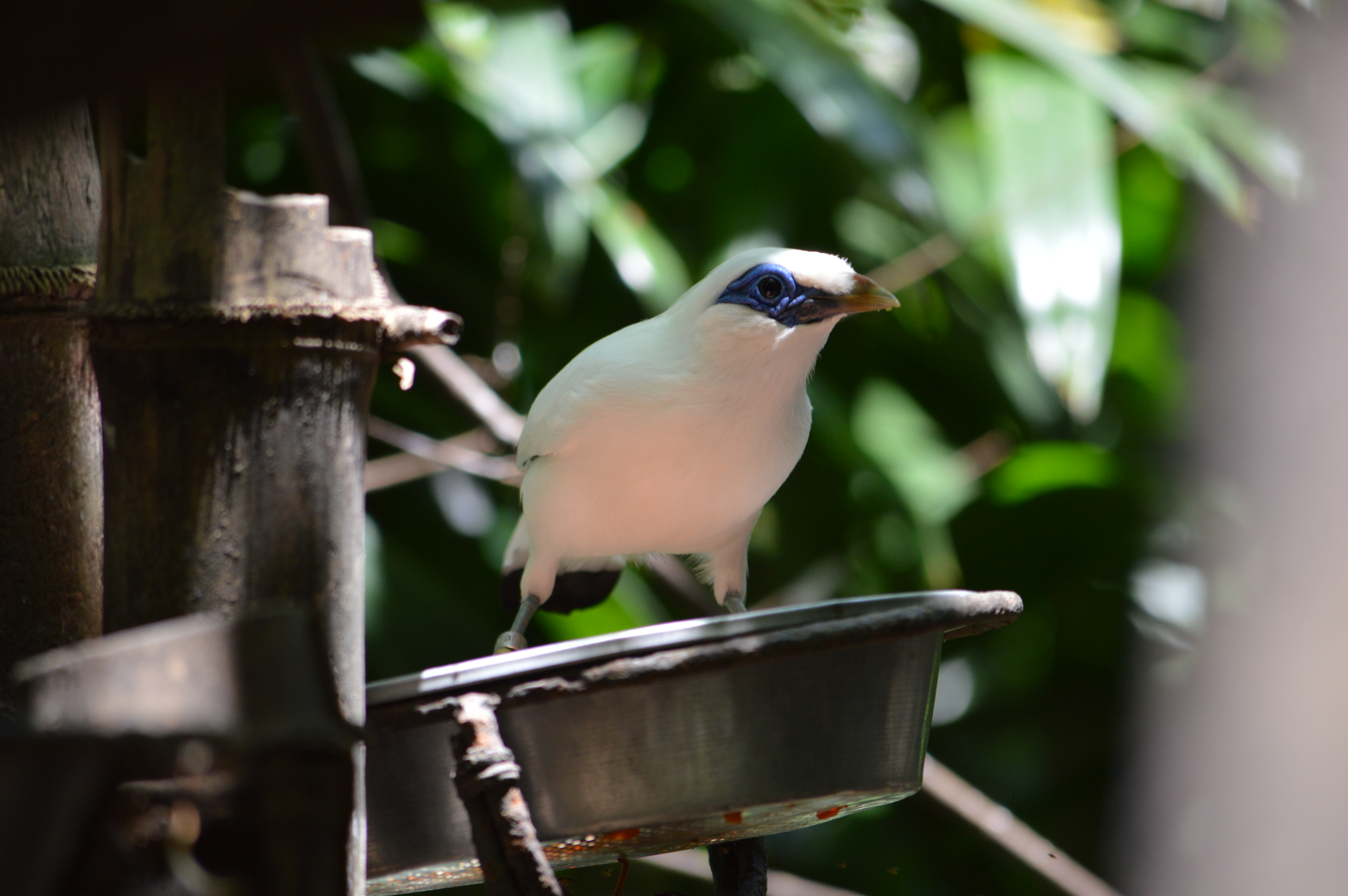
The Bali Myna, otherwise known as the Rothschild Myna, is one of the seven EAZA species at Waddesdon Manor's Aviary in Buckinghamshire, UK.

=== Victorian revival ===
Proposed architectural design for a French military aviary to house swallows as messenger birds, based upon a scheme by Jean Desbouvrie, 1889

The first large aviary inside a zoological garden was established in 1880 in the setting of the Rotterdam Zoo. Aviaries were an important aspect for the many Rothschild houses that proliferated across Europe in the 19th century. This revived a late 1600s aristocratic custom, where the elite displayed power, status and wealth by exhibiting exotic birds and animals. For instance, Baron Ferdinand de Rothschild built his aviary in 1889 at Waddesdon Manor, UK, erected in the style of Versailles' trelliswork pavilions.

=== 20th century to modern day ===
In 1902, a flying cage was completed in the setting of the National Zoological Park of the Smithsonian Institution. A new Great Flying Cage was built in 1964.

The Saint Louis Zoo is home to the 1904 World's Fair Flight Cage. It is one of only two permanent structures built for the World's Fair which still remain (the other is the Saint Louis Art Museum's Cass Gilbert building). In 1904, it was the largest bird cage ever built. It remains one of the world's largest free-flight aviaries. The 69 m (228 ft) long, 26 m (84 ft) wide, and 15 m (50 ft) high cage was built by the Smithsonian Institution specifically for the St. Louis World's Fair. Local pride in the giant cage motivated St. Louis to finally establish a zoo in 1910.

In 1937, the San Diego Zoo's aviary designed by architect Louis John Gill opened; it was then the largest in the world. The mammoth steel structure, 55 m (180 ft) long, 18 m (60 ft) wide and more than 30 m (100 ft) high, funded by the Works Progress Administration at a cost of $50,000, had no beams, cross or guy-wires to impede the flight of the birds.

With the Antwerp cage system (1948), birds are only separate from public with a light system used indoor the Bird Building at Antwerp Zoo.

At the Frankfurt Zoo, the bird house was built in 1969. Its Bird Halls presented birds for the first time in large glassed miniature habitats. In diving exhibits, darters and kingfishers could be seen hunting under water, and in the free-flight hall visitors still walk amongst tropical birds in dense vegetation. In 1963, the same principle was used outdoors to construct the Bird Thicket, ten aviaries surrounded by dense bushes and designed in various habitat settings, which visitors can enter through wire netted doors and curtains of cords.

The Snowdon Aviary in London Zoo was designed by Antony Armstrong-Jones, 1st Earl of Snowdon, Cedric Price and Frank Newby, and built in 1962–1964.

The Bronx Zoo's World of Birds, a two-story bird house completed in 1972, is a huge, landscaped, indoor free-flight exhibit. The one-way flow pattern in the exhibit moves the visitors through twenty-five birds habitats, ranging from desert to tropical forest. Each setting recreates with impressive fidelity the microculture of the birds that fly merrily about within their diorama world, complete with living plants. Five of the aviaries are completely open: in two of the largest the uncaged public walks through the habitat with birds freely overhead.

The Henry Doorly Zoo's Simmons Aviary opened in 1983 and is one of the world's largest free-flight aviaries. About 500 birds from all parts of the world occupy the area of the aviary. In this 16,000-square-metre (4-acre) exhibit, visitors see flamingos, ducks, swans, storks, cranes, spoonbills, ibis and egrets. The Aviary is 240 m (800 ft) long and rises to 23 m (75 ft) at the center. The structure of two-inch nylon mesh is supported by a system of cables and poles. The use of nylon instead of wire is a unique concept.

Birds of Eden bird sanctuary, located in the Western Cape of South Africa, was the largest free flight aviary in the world from its opening in 2005 until 2026. The aviary covers an area of 21,761 m^{2} (234,230 sq ft) with a total volume of 375,372 m^{3} (13,256,100 cu ft). It is home to around 3,000 individual birds from 200 species.

The Deccan Birds Aviary, located at the Kothwalguda Eco Park in Hyderabad, India, stands as the largest free-flight walk-through aviary by land area. Covering an area of 6 acres (24,000 m^{2}), the Deccan Birds Aviary hosts roughly 6,500 birds from four continents. The aviary opened to the public in March 2026.

== List of public aviaries ==
Name	Location	Size
Bali Bird Park	Bali, Indonesia	20,000 m^{2}
Bioparco di Roma	Rome, Italy	725 m^{2}
Bird Garden of Isfahan	Isfahan, Iran	17,000 m^{2}
Bird Kingdom	Niagara Falls, Ontario, Canada	4,200 m^{2}
Bird Paradise	Mandai, Singapore	170,000 m^{2}
Birds of Eden	Western Cape, South Africa	23,000 m^{2}
Bloedel Floral Conservatory	Vancouver, British Columbia, Canada	1,450 m^{2}
Chai Nat Bird Park	Chai Nat province, Thailand	38,500 m^{2}
Clissold Park	Hackney, United Kingdom	54 m^{2}
Deccan Birds Aviary	Hyderabad, India	24,280 m^{2}
Edward Youde Aviary	Hong Kong, China	3,000 m^{2}
Flamingo Gardens	Davie, Florida, United States	2,300 m^{2}
Flying High Bird Sanctuary	Apple Tree Creek, Australia	8,100 m^{2}
Great South American Aviary	Saint-Aignan-sur-Cher, France	
Hamilton Aviary	Hamilton, Ontario, Canada	
Karanji Lake Aviary	Mysuru, India	2,400 m^{2}
Kobe Kachoen	Kobe, Japan	
Kuala Lumpur Bird Park	Kuala Lumpur, Malaysia	85,000 m^{2}
Lake View Bird Park	Islamabad, Pakistan	
Les Aigles du Léman	Sciez, France	
Loro Parque	Tenerife, Spain	
Melaka Bird Park	Melaka, Malaysia	20,200 m^{2}
National Aviary	Pittsburgh, Pennsylvania, United States	
The Nest	Ixtapaluca, Mexico	70,000 m^{2}
Olching Bird Park	Olching, Germany	20,000 m^{2}
Palmitos Park	Canary Islands, Spain	
Parque das Aves	Foz do Iguaçu, Brazil	160,000 m^{2}
Saint Louis Zoo	St Louis, Missouri, United States	1,794 m^{2}
Shuka Vana	Mysuru, Karnataka, India	
Simmons Aviary	Omaha, Nebraska, United States	16,000 m^{2}
Tracy Aviary	Salt Lake City, Utah, United States	32,000 m^{2}
Turtle Back Zoo	New Jersey, United States	
Vogelpark Avifauna	Alphen aan den Rijn, Netherlands	150,000 m^{2}
Vogelpark Turnersee	St. Kanzian am Klopeiner See, Carinthia, Austria	20,000 m^{2}
Voliere Zürich	Enge, Zürich, Switzerland	
Waddesdon Manor's Aviary	Waddesdon, Buckinghamshire, United Kingdom	
Weltvogelpark Walsrode	Walsrode, Germany	240,000 m^{2}
Wings of Asia	Miami Metro Zoo, Florida, United States	5,017 m^{2}
World of Birds Wildlife Sanctuary and Monkey Park	Hout Bay, Cape Town, South Africa	40,000 m^{2}

=== Former aviaries ===
- Aviary — Lynchburg, Virginia, United States
- Alfa Planetarium — Nuevo León, Mexico
- Catalina Bird Park — Catalina Island, United States
- Leeds Castle — Leeds, United Kingdom
- Living Coasts — Torquay, Devon, United Kingdom
- Snowdon Aviary — London, United Kingdom
- Jurong Bird Park — Singapore
- Varro's Aviary — Italy (ancient)
- Vogelpark Kahl — Kahl am Main, Germany

== Gallery ==
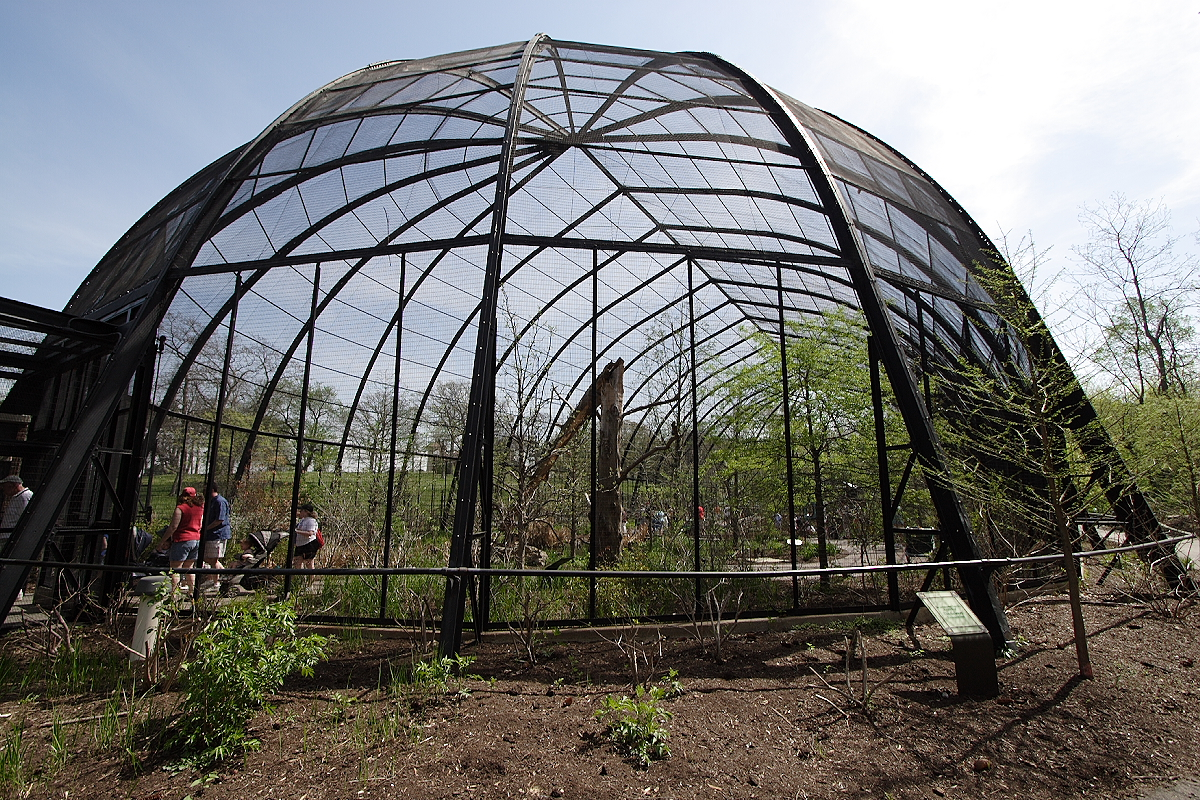
1904 Flight Cage
St. Louis Zoo

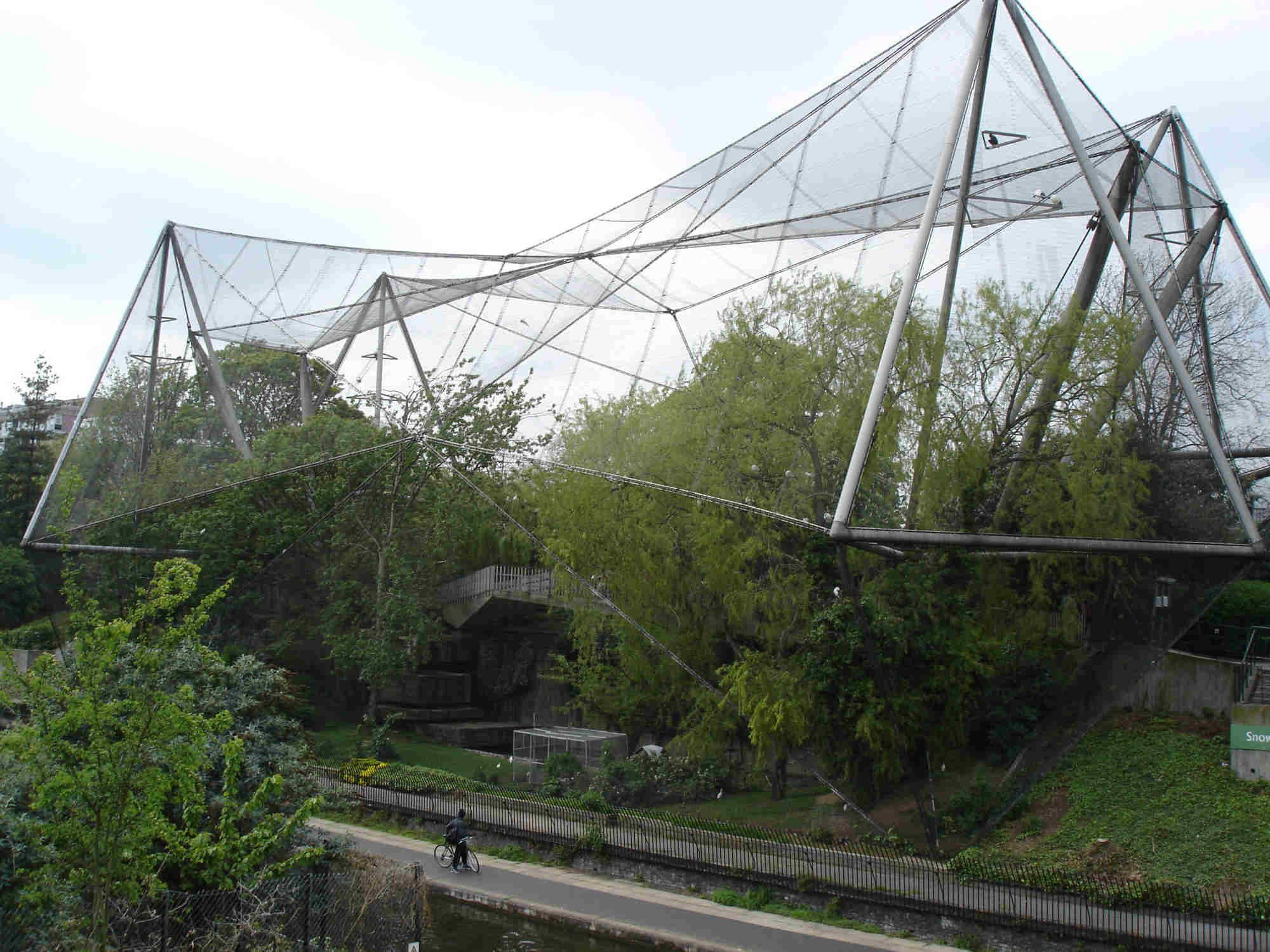
The Snowdon Aviary in London Zoo

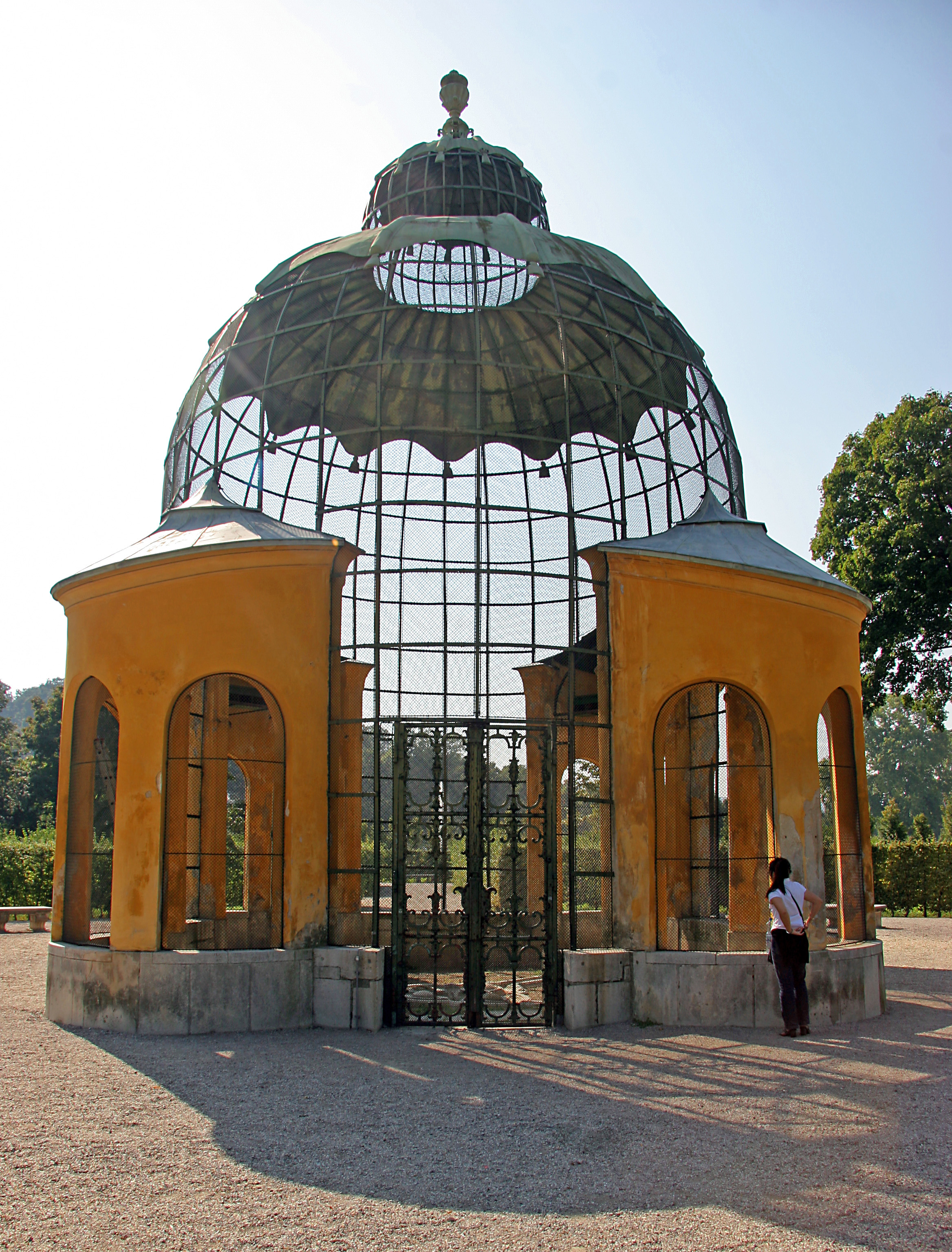
Aviary in the gardens of Schönbrunn Palace in Vienna, Austria

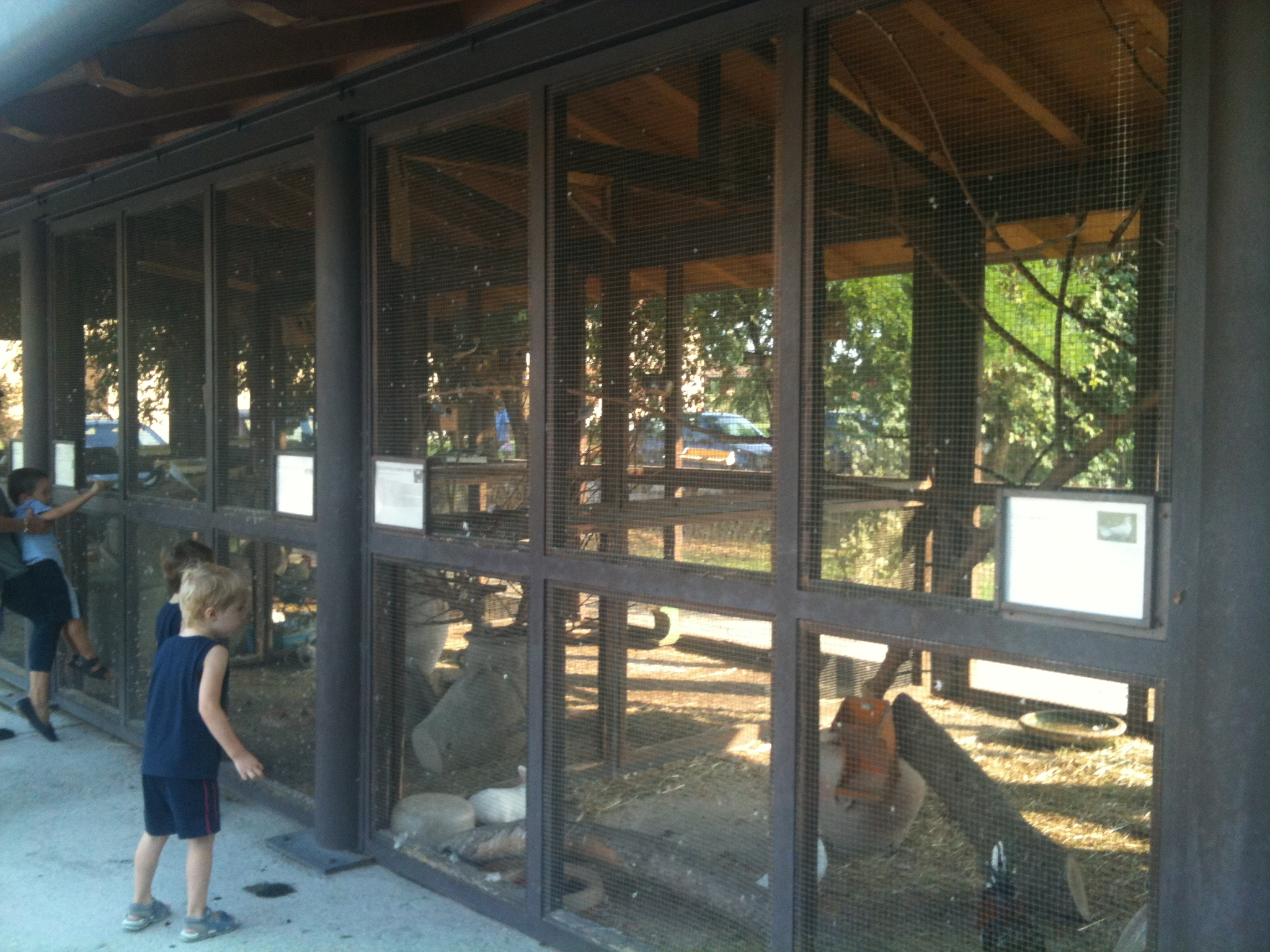
Aviary in a farm of Concorezzo, Italy

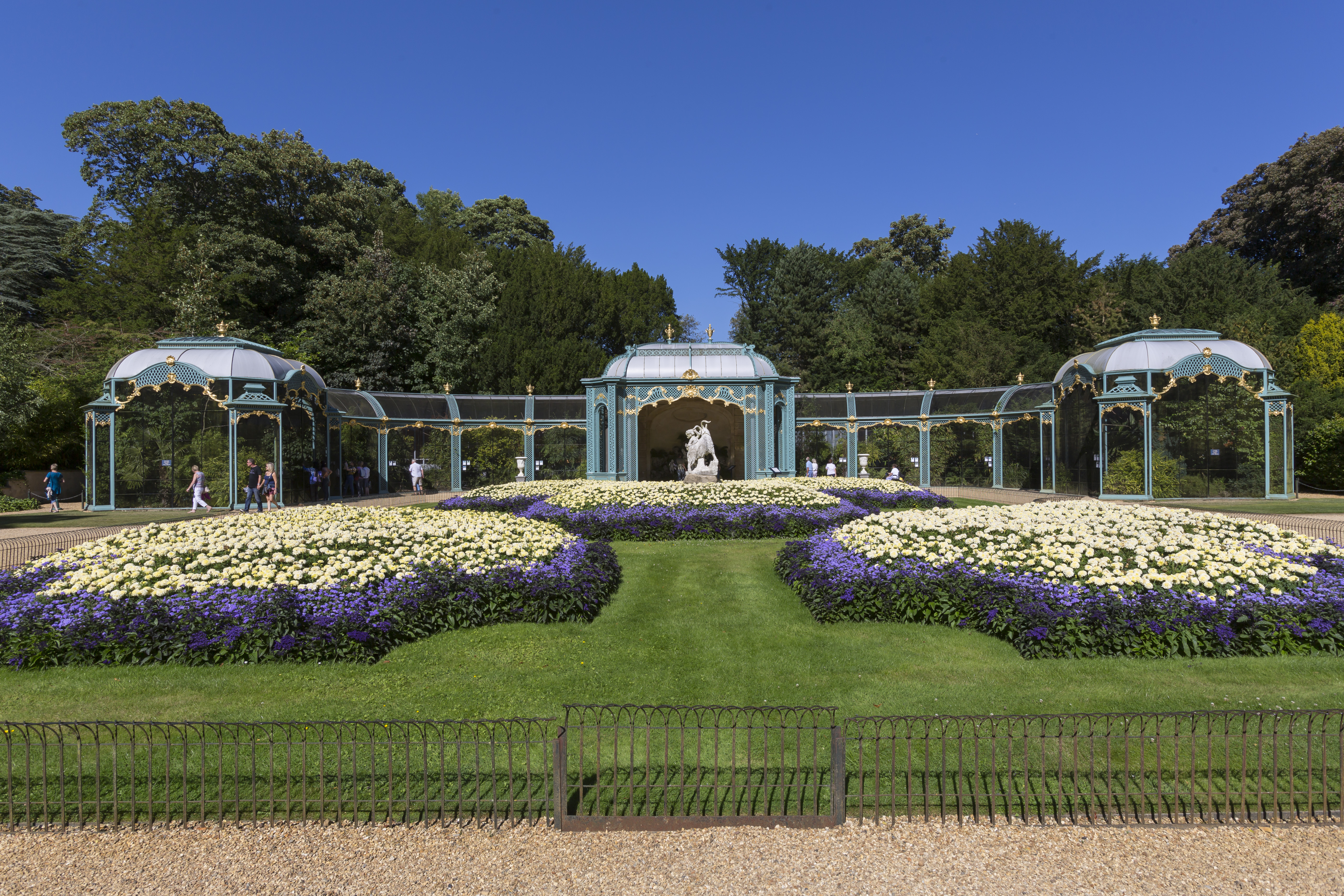
The Victorian Aviary at Waddesdon Manor, a National Trust property in Buckinghamshire, 1889
