= Eberndorf Abbey =

Abbey of Eberndorf
- Stift Eberndorf
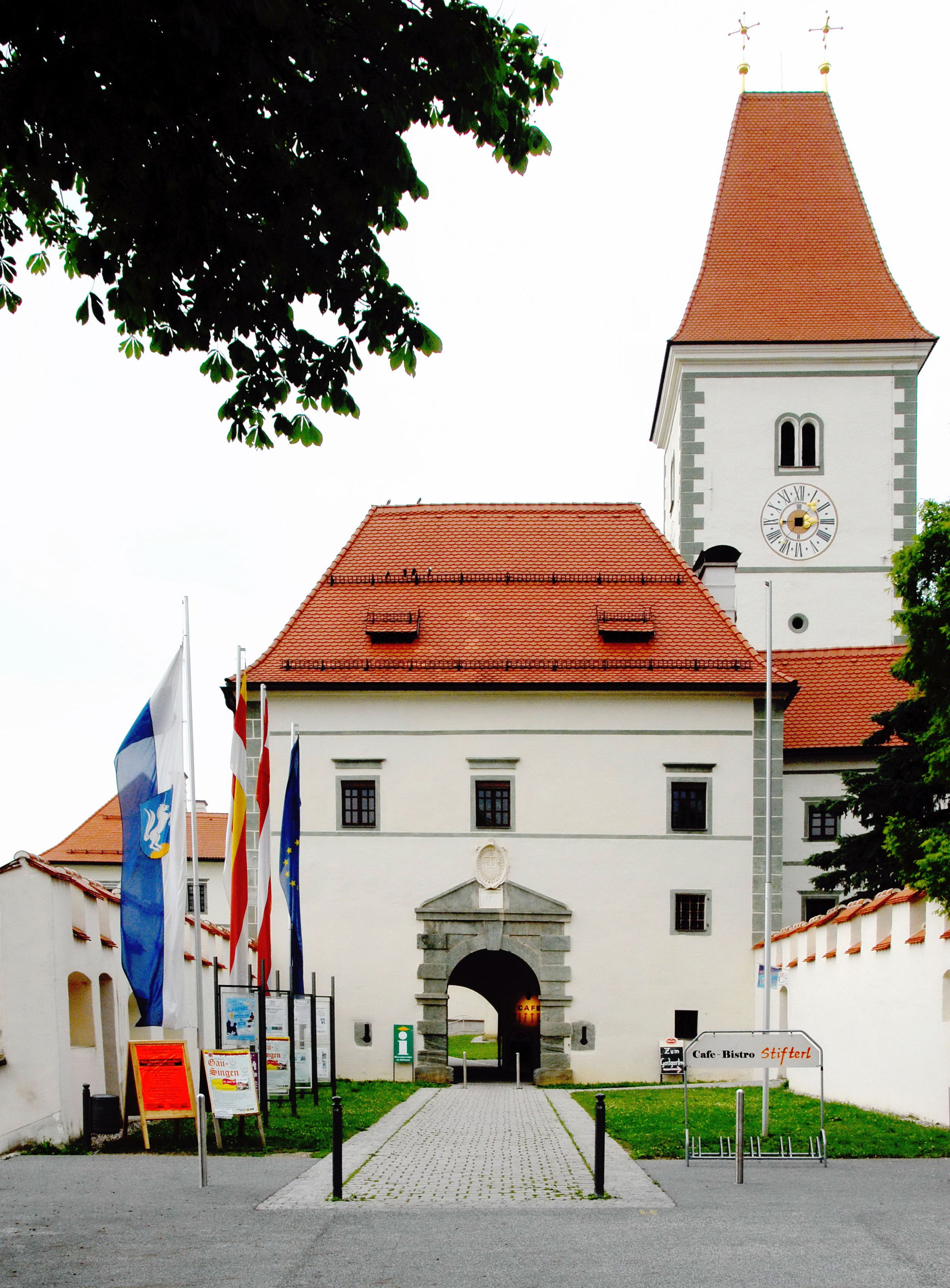
- Southern entrance to the courtyard of the Abbey Church in Eberndorf (2007)

- Location within Austria

General information
- Location: Eberndorf, Carinthia, Austria
- Coordinates: 46°35′32″N 14°38′26″E

The former Augustinian "choral" Abbey of Eberndorf is located in a small bilingual market town half an hour to the east of Klagenfurt in Carinthia (Austria).

Following several changes in ownership it has since 1809 been part of the endowment of Saint Paul's Abbey, Lavanttal nearby. It currently houses Eberndorf's council office and kindergarten.

== History ==
=== Beginnings ===
The Friulian Count Kazelin and his countess, who were childless, gifted a small "Church of Our Lady" and their worldly goods to endow a Monastery at (what subsequently became) Eberndorf in approximately 1100. Patriarch Ulrich I of Aquileia confirms the gifting of the lands and associated rights in a document of 1106. The bodies of the benefactors were transferred to Eberndorf and a large church was constructed. The consecration of the church was carried out by Bishop Riwin of Concordia. The patriarch also endowed the monastery with assets in the surrounding area. Around the middle of the twelfth century Patriarch Pellegrinus I of Aquileia enlarged Eberndorf, which now, as an "Augustiner-Chorherren-Stift", became home to an Augustinian choir.

=== Troubled times ===
The monastery was located close to the frontier that separated Carinthia from Styria (to the south and east), and in the years that followed there were frequent clashes with bailiffs employed by the Margraves of Styria, and with their successors, the Babenbergs. This ended with the transfer of the bailiffs involved to the Counts of Carinthia.

Between 1446 and 1476 fortifications were added under Provost Lorenz. During the years of turbulence that ensued the monastery nevertheless suffered serious damage from incursions by Turkish and Hungarian armies. The building was destroyed by fire in 1483, and rebuilt under the leadership of Provost Leonhard of Keutschach, and further construction took place at the start of the next century under Provost Valentin Fabri.

=== Reformation and counter-reformation ===
The "Augustiner-Chorherren-Stift" remained in place till 1604 when the monastery became a Jesuit establishment in the wider context of the Catholic fight-back against the Protestant Reformation of the previous century. By the end of the sixteenth century the monastery had in any case become very run down as a result of "mismanagement", and there had been talk of simply closing it down. The installation of the Jesuits by Pope Clement VIII involved bringing Eberndorf under the authority of the Jesuit College in Klagenfurt, and enjoyed the support of the emperor. The last provost before the Jesuits moved in was Sebastian Kobel. Surviving inscriptions indicate that the last major burst of building activity at the monastery took place during the middle years of the seventeenth century.

=== Later centuries ===
The Suppression of the Society of Jesus in 1773 ushered in a period of uncertainty for the monastery in Eberndorf, the property of which eventually, in 1809, came under the protection of the Benedictines at St. Blaise Abbey on the southern edge of the Black Forest. Three years later responsibility for the assets was transferred to the care of the very much closer Benedictine Monastery in the Laventtal (valley). That remains the position today. The buildings themselves are leased to the municipality and accommodate a school and various administrative facilities.

== Architecture ==
=== Overall ===
The plan of the site is relatively large, the buildings grouped on a gentle slope, with the frontages facing to the west and the south. The eastern side is occupied chiefly by farm buildings. The north side faces onto a wooded area and is accordingly left relatively wild.

=== Gatehouse and entrance ===
The gatehouse is positioned on the southwest corner of the complex, and faces south. It is a two storey structure with a hipped roof. Like the adjacent buildings to its east, it originated as part of the late medieval fortifications. In the seventeenth century the gatehouse was slightly modified, however. The gateway features a banded stone frame topped with a protruding gable, with the year "1634" carved directly above it, partially surrounding a medallion shape showing the "Christ Monogramme".

Visitors passing through the gatehouse still do so, moving from south to north, between a pair of walls topped with battlements, and would originally have been required to do so while passing between two stout gates at the opposite ends of the lengthy passage through the gatehouse, but the outer gate is no longer in place.

=== Front courtyard ===
Emerging from the gatehouse into the front courtyard, bordered by walls on it eastern and western sides, the visitor encounters a free-standing church tower to the right. Beyond that, on the north side the site is bordered by the former monastery church, and to its left the southern end of the western wing of the main monastery complex.

=== Baroque monastery complex ===
The monastery complex comprises four wings surrounding a not quite square shared shaped second courtyard. The present structure dates from approximately 1634, the year identified on the outside of the gatehouse, but partly follows the footprint of the previous structure, especially with regard to the north and west wings. The seventeenth century master builder credited with having provided the present structure was Pietro Francesco Carlone, a prolific builder of abbeys at the time. The three storey eastern wing, elevated by the effect of the gently rising ground, provides a monumental impression. The protruding tower on the northwestern corner, reminiscent of a castle residence, dates back to the monastery's medieval fortified structure: the tower's other functions and uses are not entirely clear. The complex also includes three level pillar-arched cloisters, following the conventions of the seventeenth century, although the cloisters were partially glazed in and their outer facings renovated between 1992 and 1995. At the time of this renovation three Stucco ceilings were uncovered and recast in their original shapes and colours.

=== Monastery church ===
The 1378 medieval structure was replaced in two stages in the late gothic style of the area, and a choir with a crypt was added. The five arch late Gothic nave was added in 1506, and underwent extensive external restoration in 1995. What remains of the Romanesque structure, including the mausoleum-chapel of the Ungnad family with its Romanesque windows, are mostly on the southside of the broad arched nave. Spaciousness is achieved with a twelve step staircase from the nave to the choir section, positioned above the crypt.

== See also ==
- List of Jesuit sites
