= Varro's Aviary =

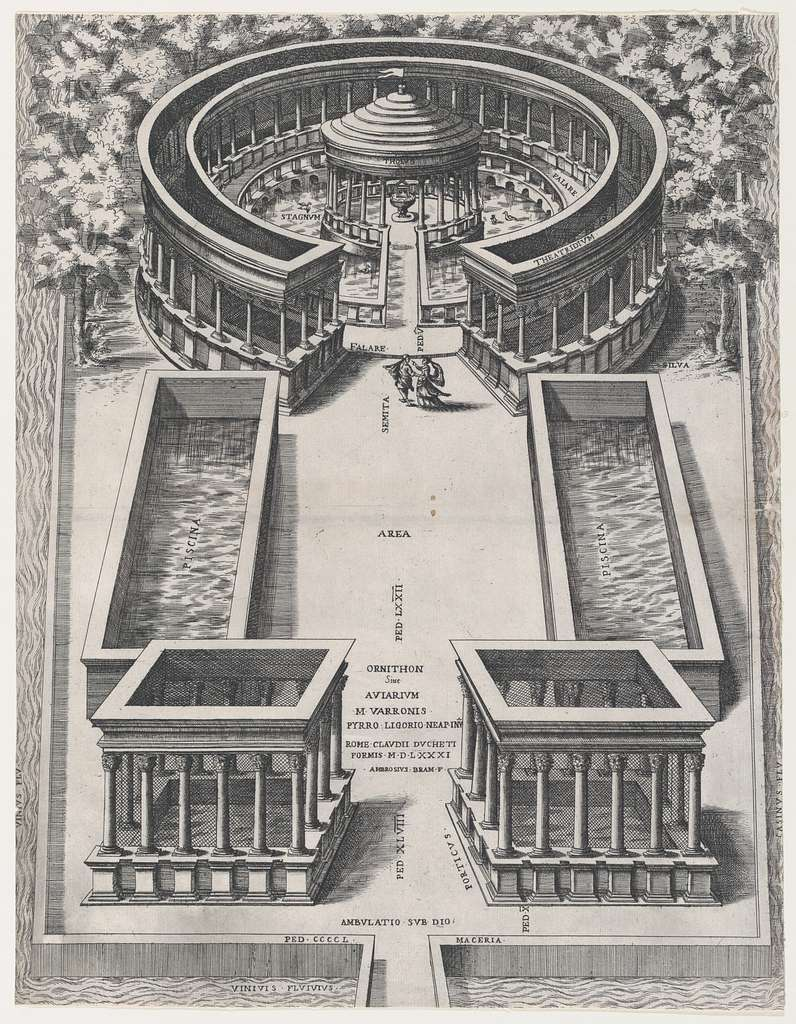
Aviary reconstruction by Pirro Ligorio (mid-16th century)

Varro's Aviary (also known as Ornithon) was a part of the Roman villa built in the 1st century BC (c. 40 BC) by Marcus Terentius Varro, an important figure in Ancient Rome at the times of Cicero. While the building itself is long gone, Varro's very detailed description of the aviary is preserved in his book de Re Rustica. This description inspired multiple reconstructions since at least the Renaissance era. Varro's villa was located on Via Latina halfway from Rome to Naples, the exact location is still unknown.

The aviary was shaped "in a form of a writing tablet with a top-piece". The footprint of the rectangular part of aviary was 72 x 48 Roman feet, a stream run from this ornithon to the (little-described) musaeum (place dedicated to Muses, evoking the atmosphere of akademia) connected by 10 feet wide ambulatio (walkway) forming a 950 feet long loop along the banks of the stream.

The focal point of the design was a small island, surrounded by a circular pond with ducks, intended for dining. This element possibly was used as inspiration for the Maritime Theatre at the Hadrian's Villa (on a much larger scale). The dining area (triclinium) was covered with a dome made of wood, and equipped with a revolving table, so that the food can be "moved around to all the guests".

The aviary housed birds "of every kind", but primarily the songbirds, including nightingales and blackbirds. At the time of Varro the idea of keeping birds for pleasure (Latin: delectationis causa), not just for profit, was novel in the Ancient Rome.

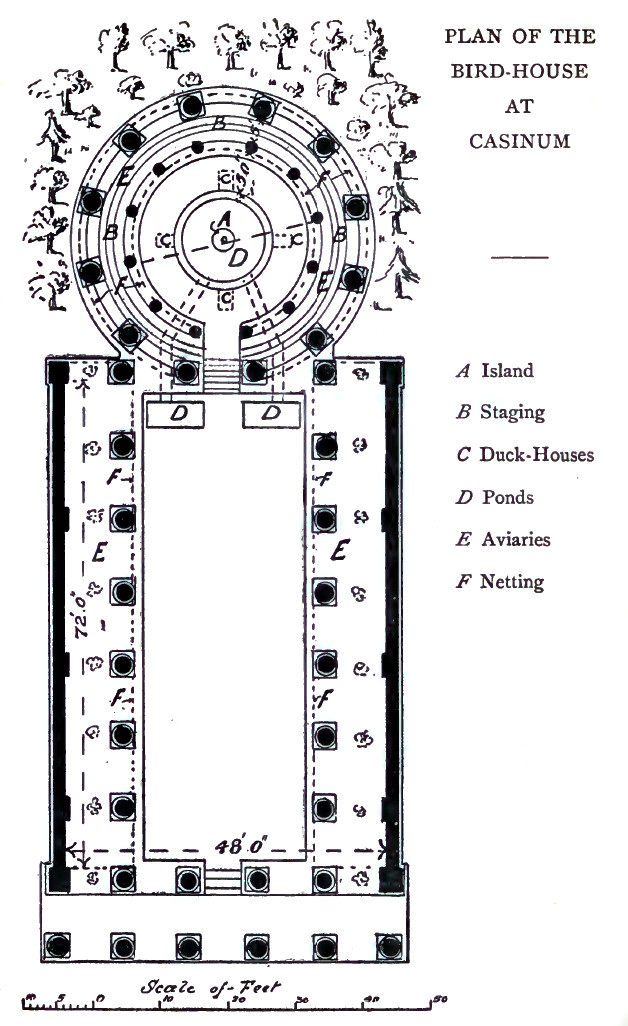
Reconstruction plan (early 20th century)

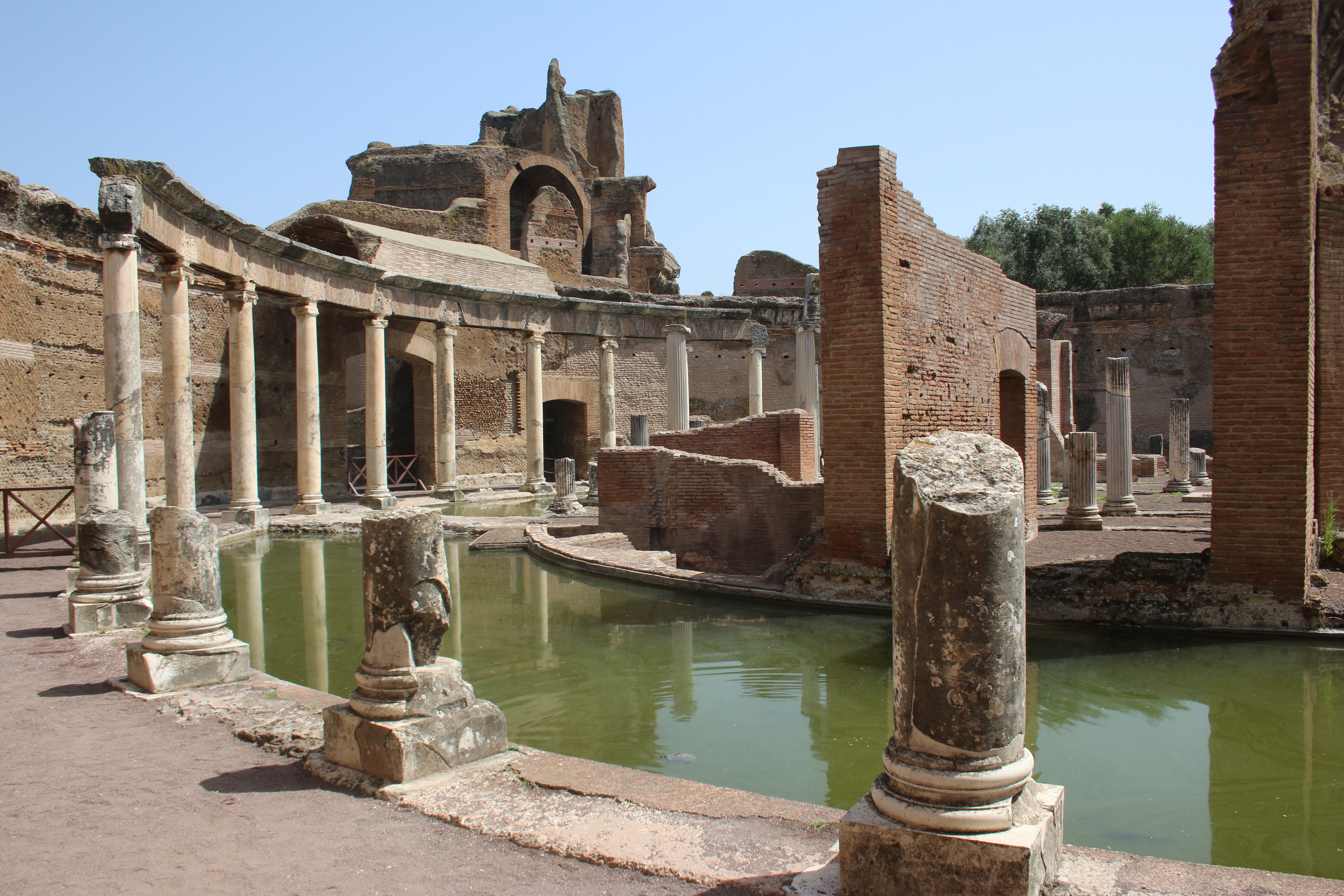
Maritime Theatre

== Sources ==
- Van Buren, A. W.; Kennedy, R. M. (1919). "Varro's Aviary at Casinum". The Journal of Roman Studies. 9. [Society for the Promotion of Roman Studies, Cambridge University Press]: 59–66. doi:10.2307/295988. ISSN 0075-4358. JSTOR 295988.
- Cellauro, Louis (2015). "In search of a setting for learning in Roman antiquity: Renaissance surveys of Varro's garden musaeum at Casinum". Renaissance Studies. 29 (2): 204–226. doi:10.1111/rest.12061. ISSN 0269-1213.
- Errico, Silvana (2022). "Novità su forma e ubicazione della voliera di Varrone (rust. III, 5, 9-17)" [New developments on the shape and location of Varro’s aviary (rust. III, 5, 9-17)]. SPOLIA (in Italian) (8).
- Thacker, C. (1985). The History of Gardens. University of California Press. pp. 19–21. ISBN 978-0-520-05629-9.
