= Kazelin =

Kazelin (died around 1092) was a nobleman with estates in Friuli and Carinthia. His offices from the emperor included those of Imperial Hofmeister and Count palatine. He was childless, and appears in records chiefly on account of two monastic foundations that he endowed.

Due to the multilingual character of the area and linguistic changes in the intervening thousand years, his name appears in sources with a range of spellings: these include Kazellin, Chazelinus, Cazelin, Cacellino, Chacelo, Chazil, Chazilo, Chadalhoch and Kadeloch.

== Life ==
Kazelin was probably the son of Count Chadalhoch of Leoben and the Isengau, a member of the Aribonid dynasty, and of his wife Irmingard. In a 1072 record concerning the foundation of Michaelbeuern Abbey, Kazelin is described as a "Miles" (knight, fief, agent) of the patriarch Sieghard of Aquileia.

=== Monastery at Mosach ===
In 1084/85 Kazelin gifted to his overlord, the patriarch Frederick of Aquileia, his lands at Mosach (Moggio) with the request that a Benedictine Monastery be built there. By the time the act had been communicated to Aquileia the patriarch was dying or dead (probably in February 1086) but his successor as patriarch, Ulrich of Eppenstein, received and accepted both the gift and the accompanying request. By 1119 the Benedictine monastery had been built, generously endowed with surrounding territories also gifted by Kazelin. The abbey church was consecrated by Bishop Andreas of Cividale in 1119.

=== Monastery at Eberndorf ===
It was also an endowment by Count Kazelin that provided for the creation of Eberndorf Abbey. In a record dated 1106, by when it is apparent that Kazelin had died, the Patriarch Ulrich confirms that Count Kazelin has bequeathed his entire lands, their rights and appurtenances, to the Aquileia patriarchate, and Ulrich directs that these matters should be recorded in the benefactor's tomb stone. The record also instructs that Kazelin's body should be disinterred from its existing location at Göthelich/Gösseling, then in the Archdiocese of Salzburg, and transported to the lands at Eberndorf to be buried there in a new, larger Abbey Church of Our Lady, funded and maintained using the bequest. The three lay witnesses to this document were the Counts Werigand and Vogt of Gurk, along with William of Heunburg.
