= Bird Kingdom =

Aviary in Niagara Falls, Ontario, Canada

Coordinates: 43°05′33″N 79°04′06″W

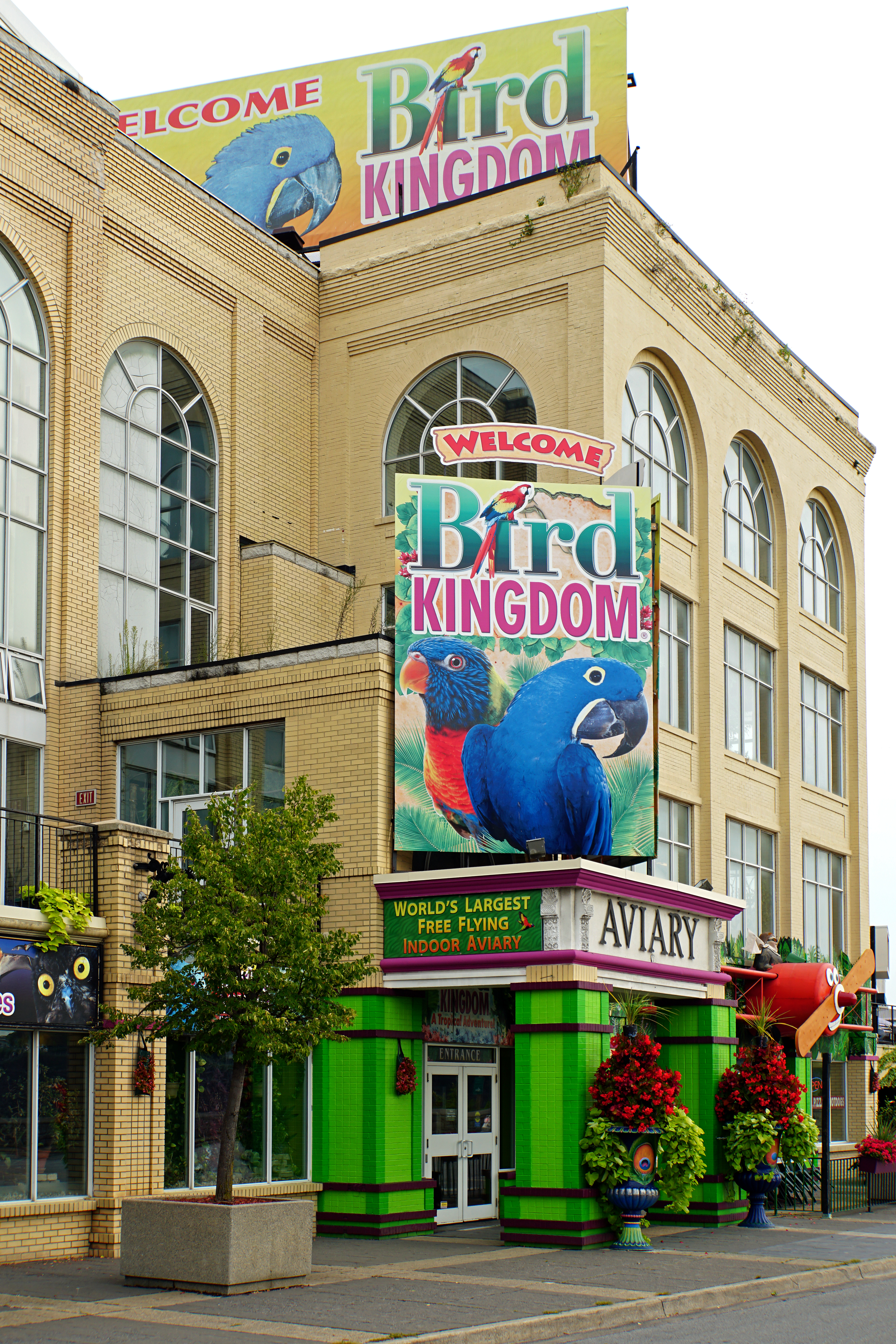
- Type: Private
- Industry: Aviary
- Founded: 2003
- Headquarters: 5651 River Road; Niagara Falls, Ontario; L2E 7M7
- Area served: United States and Canada
- Number of employees: 20
- Website: Official Website

Bird Kingdom is an aviary in the tourist district of Niagara Falls, Ontario, Canada. Opened in May 2003, it is the largest free flying indoor aviary in the world. The attraction encompasses approximately 45,000 square feet (4,200 m^{2}), and houses over 350 birds, the majority of which come from Australia, South America, and Africa. It is also home to mammals, reptiles and amphibians which are part of educational programs. Bird Kingdom has been voted a top family attraction in Niagara Falls and was inducted into the Trip Advisor Hall of Fame in 2016.

== Areas ==
=== Small Bird Aviary ===
This section of the aviary houses smaller birds. The Small Aviary houses over fifty types of birds, among which are some endangered and rare species. It overlooks the Niagara Gorge, a well known bird watching spot and bird breeding ground.

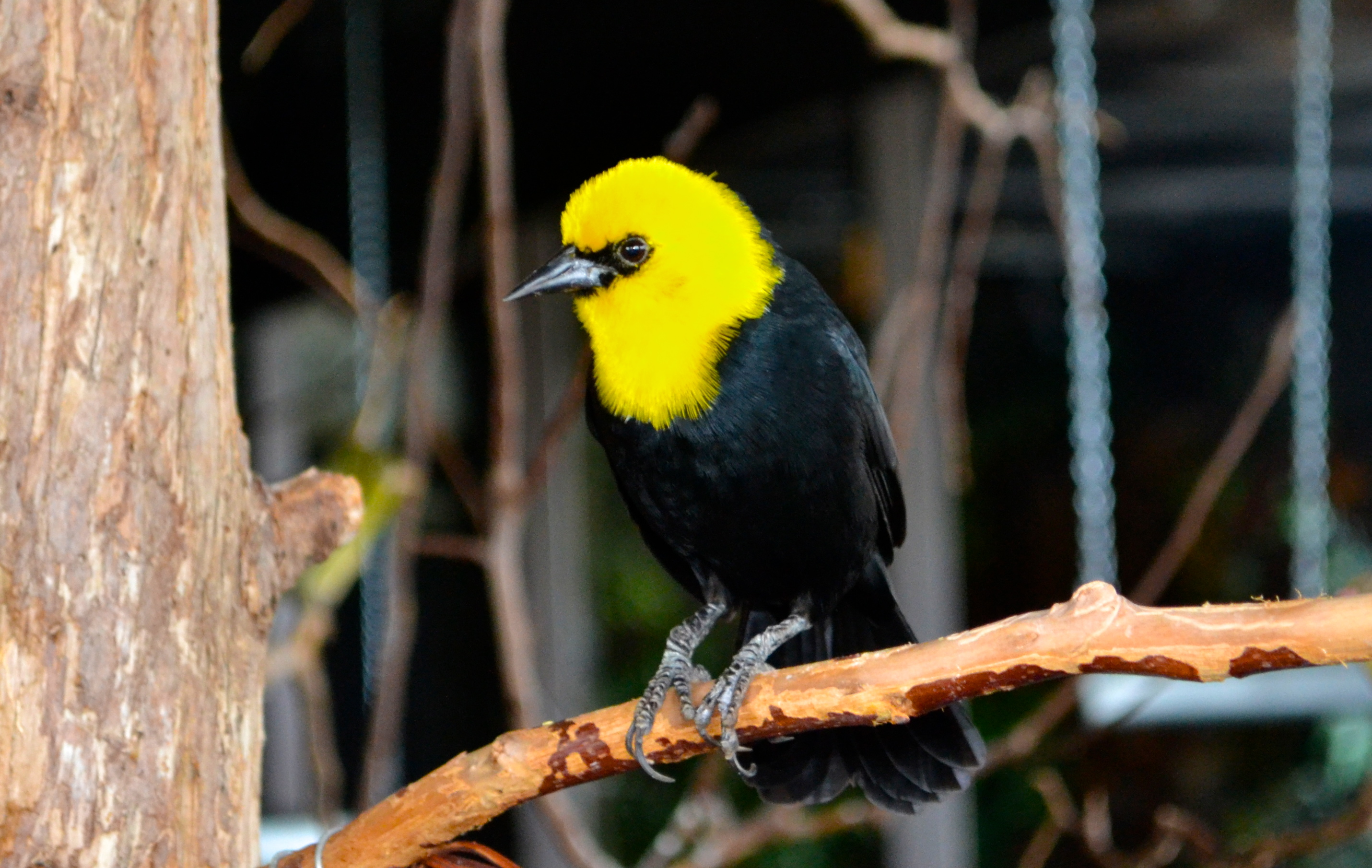
A Yellow-hooded blackbird in the Small Bird Aviary.

=== Night Jungle ===
An area where nocturnal animals can be seen. Egyptian Fruit Bats, Owls and other creatures of the night can be found in the ancient ruins of the night jungle.

=== Main Aviary ===
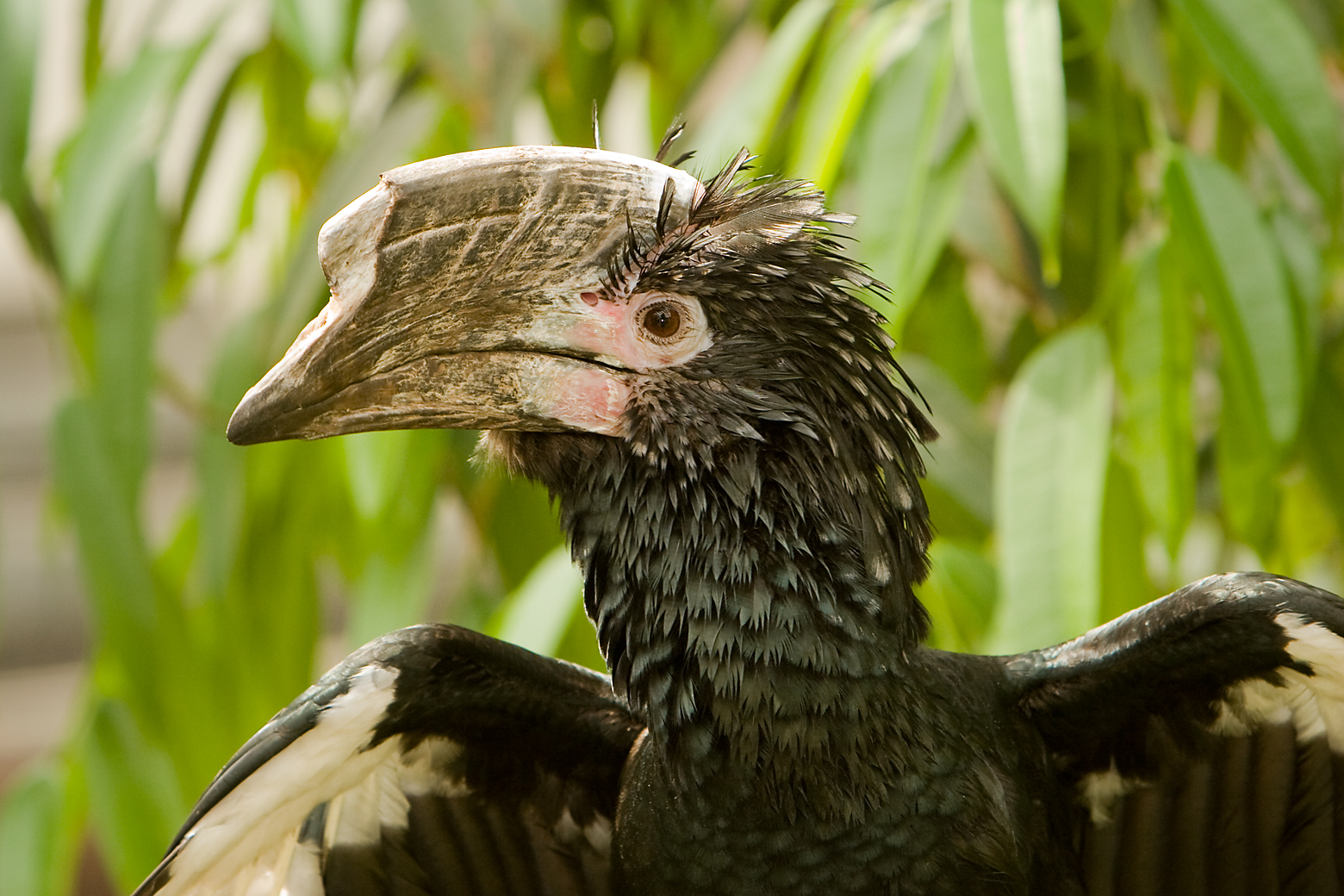
A silvery-cheeked hornbill in the Main Aviary.

The $16 million section of Bird Kingdom consists of 45,000 square feet (4,200 m^{2}) of rainforest and houses 350 birds. Those birds represent approximately 80 species from around the globe, which live in the tropical environment. In addition to the birds, there is also a 40-foot (12 m) tall waterfall. Visitors are able to feed lorikeets, and take self-guided tours.

=== Javanese House ===
Bird Kingdom houses the only authentic Javanese nobleman's house in North America. The house was hand carved with solid teak wood and constructed without nails. In the 19th century, houses like this were for the aristocratic class. The front door of the house faces south, supposedly facing the sea. The intricate carving on the roof shows visitors that the house was for a nobleman.

== History ==
In 1908, the Spirella Corset Company built a four-story concrete building on the current site of the aviary. By 1958, the company had shrunk in size, resulting in the company's moving their location to a smaller facility. The building was purchased that year by Jacob Sherman, who owned the Niagara Falls Museum. Sherman then renovated the building extensively, adding a five-story viewing tower while also moving 700,000 artifacts to the building. It was discovered later that the museum had been home to the actual mummy of King Ramesses I. By that time of that discovery, however, the museum was closed and the mummy back in Egypt.

The museum was operated by the Sherman family until 1999, when the maintenance of the building and artifacts became too costly. Most of the artifacts were sold or returned to their place of origin. Larry Vann, a resident of the Niagara area, purchased the museum building. Over the next few years, $15 million was spent on renovations to the building. The renovations included a large addition to the south side of the old museum building. In June 2003, the building re-opened as Bird Kingdom at the Niagara Falls Aviary.
