= Vogelpark Turnersee =

- Interactive map of Vogelpark Turnersee
- Date opened: 1982
- Location: Turnersee, Carinthia, Austria
- Major exhibits: Birds
- Owner: Emanuel Zupanc
- Website: vogelpark.at

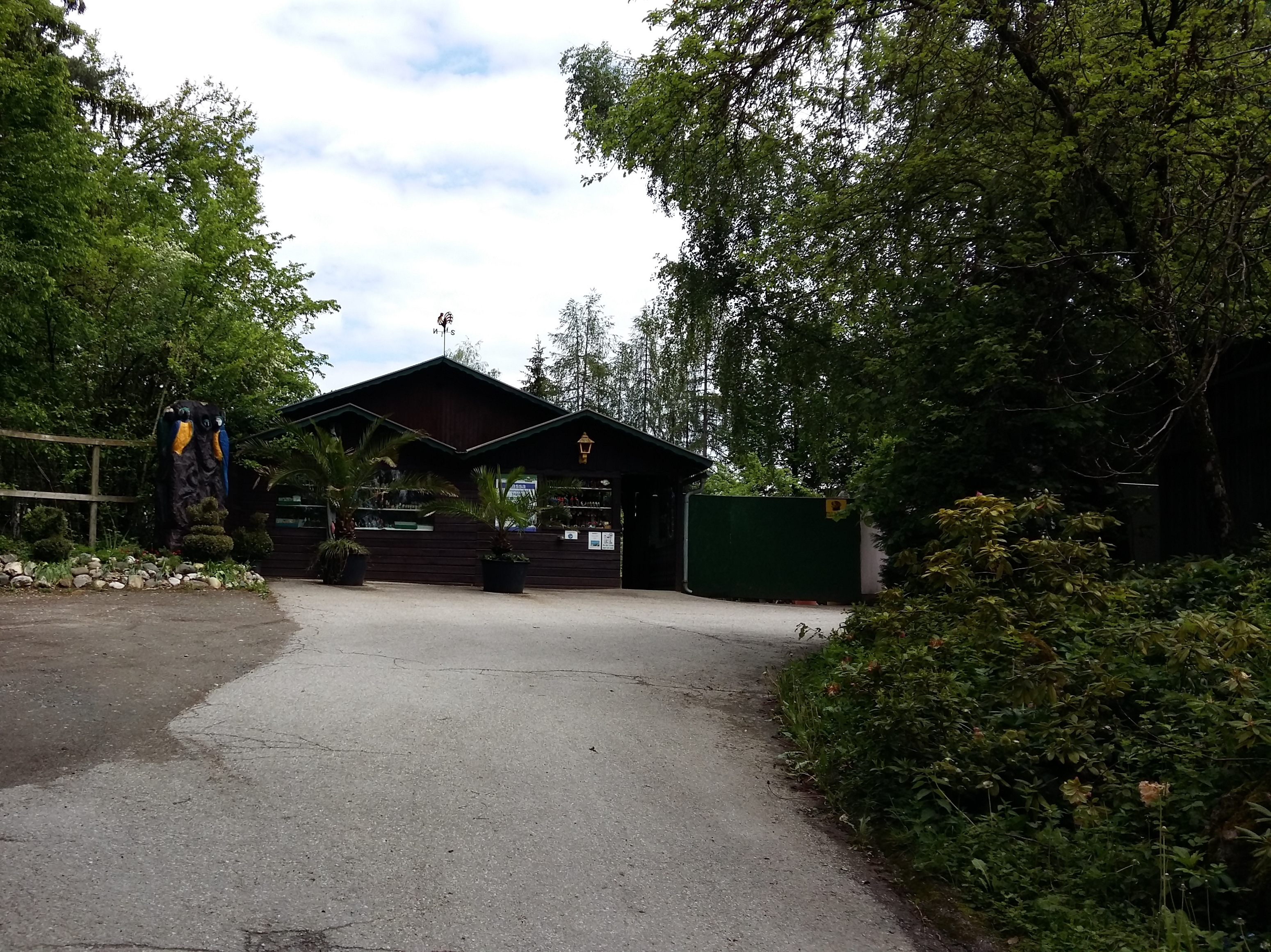

Vogelpark Turnersee (English: Turnersee bird park) is a large bird park near Turnersee in Sankt Kanzian am Klopeiner See, Carinthia, Austria.

== History ==
Vogelpark Turnersee was opened by the Zupanc family in 1982. The park exhibits a large collection of over 1000 exotic and rare birds in over 340 species from all over the world. In 1988 the Zoo opened a small section with exotic mammals. The speciality of the park is that the birds can be fed with seeds purchased at the entrance. The park also has a buffet area and a souvenir shop and is accessible also for disabled people.
