= Kleinsee =

Lake in Carinthia, Austria

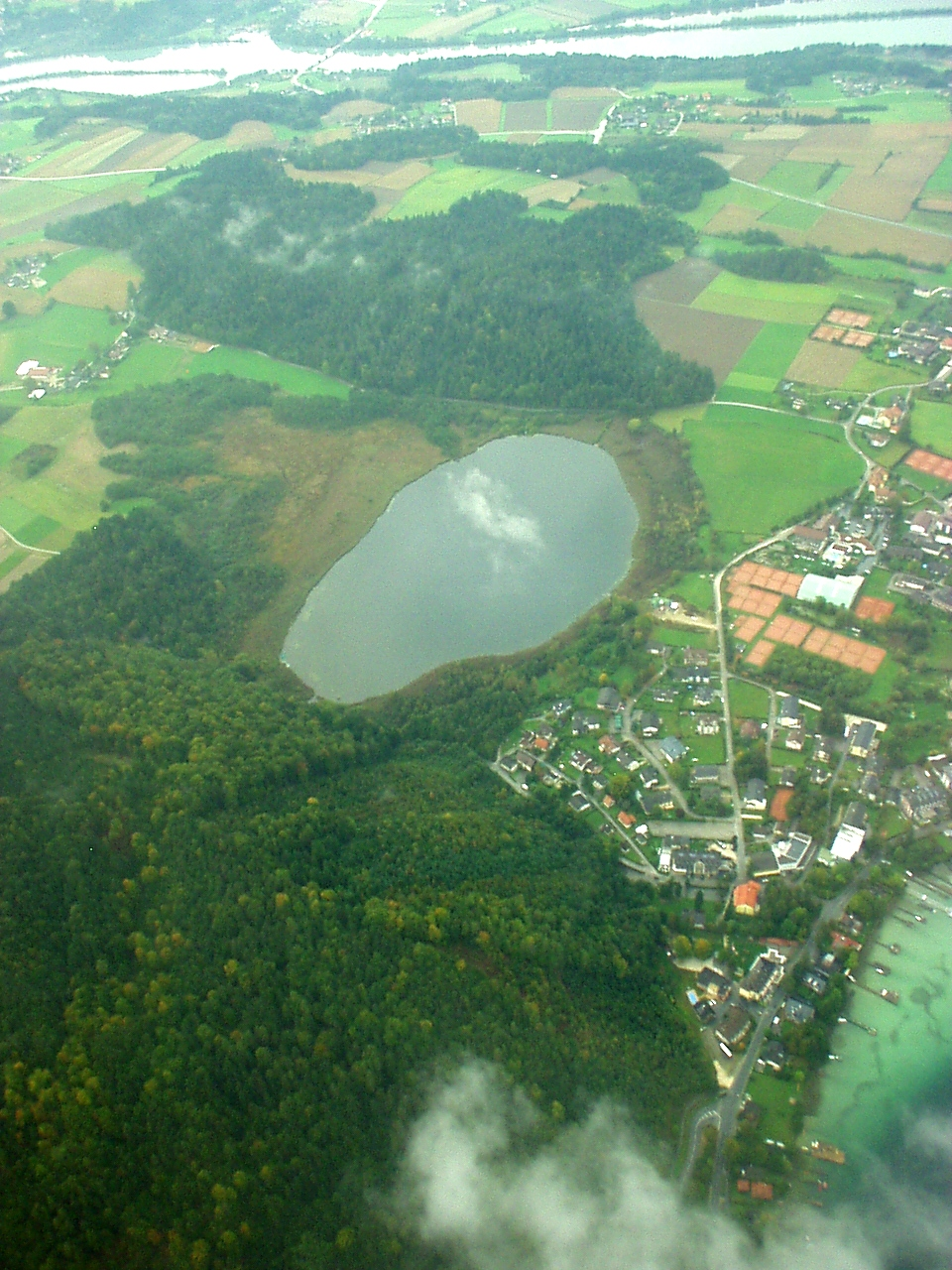

- Location within Kärnten
- Location: Carinthia
- Coordinates: 46°36′22″N 14°33′55″E
- Basin countries: Austria
- Max. depth: 15 m (49 ft)
- Settlements: Sankt Kanzian

The Kleinsee (Slovene: Malo Jezero) is a lake in the municipality of Sankt Kanzian in Carinthia, Austria.

The maximum depth of the Kleinsee is 15 meters, while its average depth is 10 meters. The larger Lake Klopein lies a little way east, separated by the village of Seelach.
