= Gösselsdorfer See =

Lake in Carinthia, Austria

Gösseldorfer See
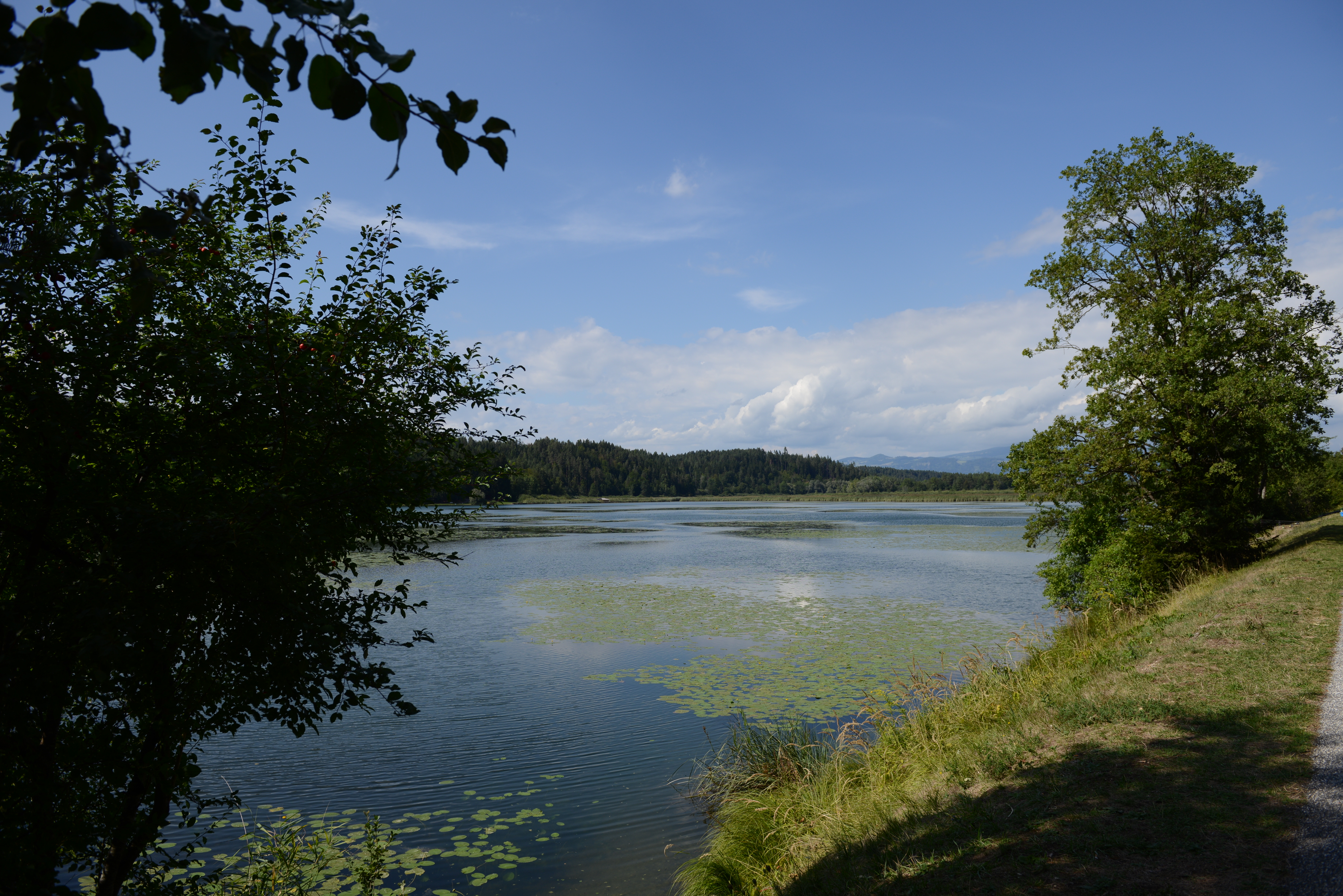
- Southeastern shore

- Location within Kärnten
- Location: Carinthia
- Coordinates: 46°34′N 14°37′E
- Primary outflows: to Drava River
- Catchment area: 28.81 km^{2} (11.12 mi^{2})
- Basin countries: Austria
- Max. length: 469 m (1,539 ft)
- Surface area: 32 ha (0.12 mi^{2})
- Average depth: 1.9 m (6.2 ft)
- Max. depth: 3 m (9.8 ft)
- Water volume: 608,000 m^{3} (493 acre⋅ft)
- Surface elevation: 469 m (1,539 ft)

Gösselsdorfer See (Slovene: Goslinsko jezero) is a lake of Carinthia, Austria.

The largely silted up lake is located between the municipalities of Eberndorf and Sittersdorf. It is characterised by extensive reed banks and adjacent wetlands. The waters are part of a larger protected landscape area.
