= Bird Garden of Isfahan =

Zoo in Isfahan, Iran

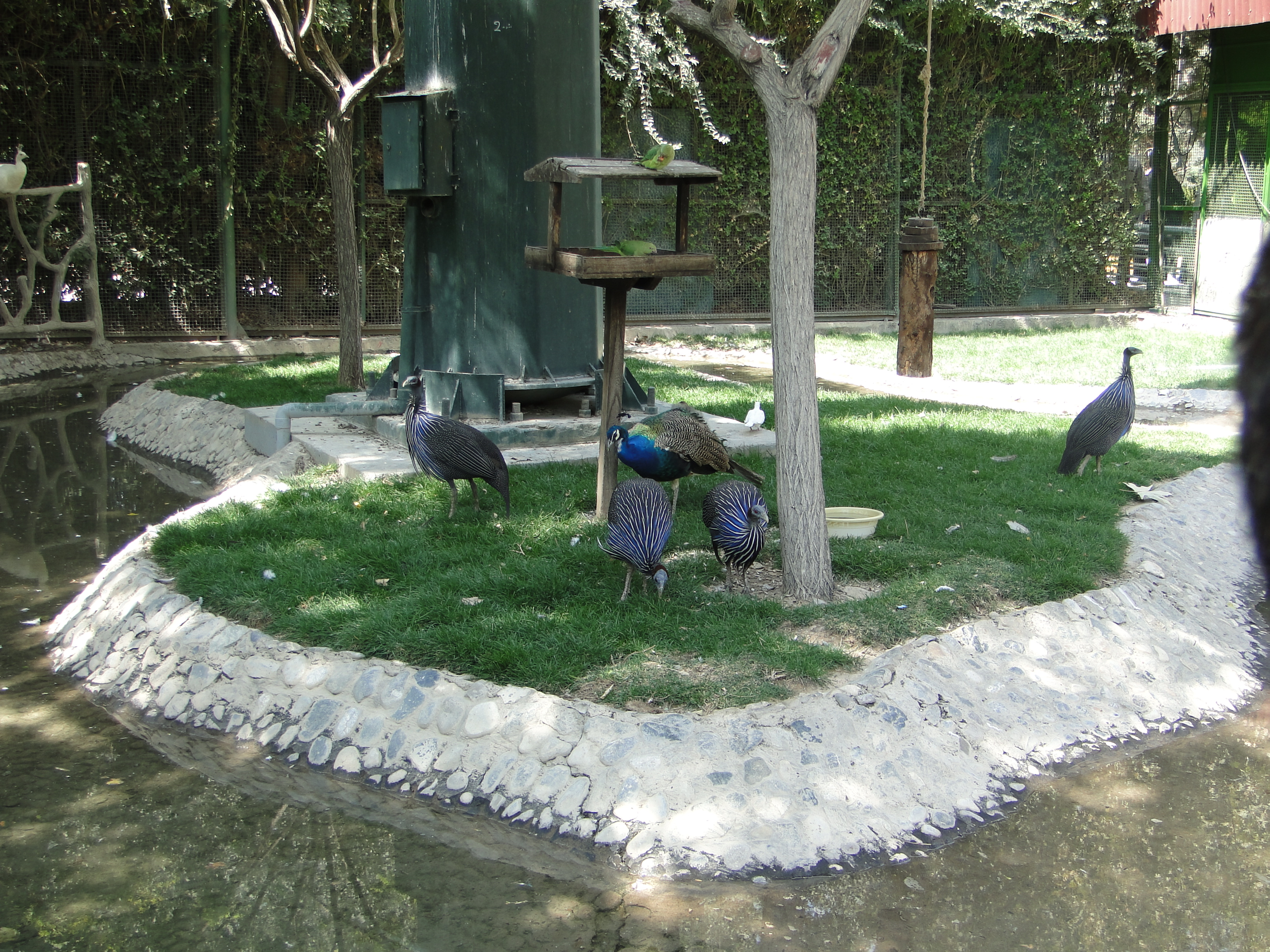
- Interactive map of Bird Garden of Isfahan
- 32°38′27″N 51°36′34″E
- Date opened: 1990s
- Location: Isfahan, Iran
- Land area: 17000 m²
- No. of animals: 5000 birds
- No. of species: 130
- Major exhibits: different species of birds from different parts of Iran and other countries

The Bird Garden of Isfahan (Persian: باغ پرندگان اصفهان) was founded in 1998 by the municipality of Isfahan and it is now under the supervision of the recreation and welfare organization of the municipality. The garden has an area of 17000 m². It's enclosed and covered by a chain-link fence pitched on 16 moveable metal pillars with a height of up to 32 m. More than 5000 birds from 130 different species are kept in the garden. The birds are native to different parts of Iran and also other countries like Australia, Indonesia, China, and Tanzania.
