= Lake Turner =

Lake in Carinthia, Austria

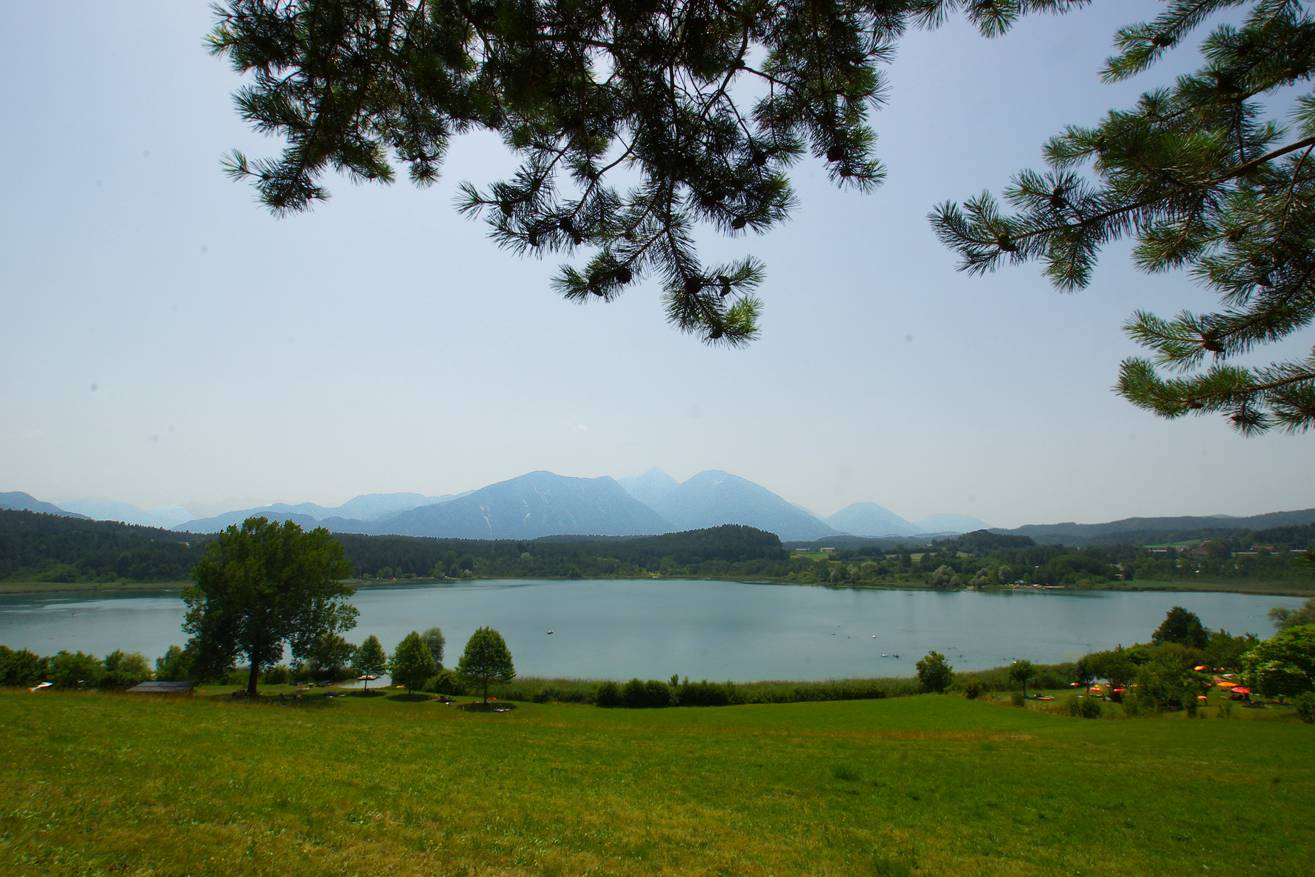

- Location within Kärnten
- Location: Carinthia
- Coordinates: 46°35′4″N 14°34′33″E
- Basin countries: Austria
- Surface area: 44 ha (110 acres)
- Max. depth: 13 m (43 ft)
- Surface elevation: 481 m (1,578 ft)

Lake Turner (German: Turnersee; Slovene: Zablaško jezero) is a lake in the municipality of Sankt Kanzian in Carinthia, Austria.

== Description ==
The lake lies together with Gösselsdorfer See on the Rückersdorfer's plate. It spans over an area of 44 hectares. The lake is covered with Mire and Phragmites. On the shores of Lake Turner grow various flowers, such as Primula farinosa, Menyanthes, Epipactis palustris. the lake is covered with Nymphaea and Nuphar. Various species of fish are found in the lake, such as Percidae, Wels catfish, Northern pike, Tench and Astacus astacus. Among bird species you can see Western yellow wagtail, European stonechat and Northern lapwing.

There are seven swimming areas around the lake with two camping areas and several private tourist accommodations.

== History ==
The original name of the lake was Sablatnigsee. The name was changed to Turnersee in the 20th century.
