= Eberndorf =

Eberndorf Dobrla vas
- Municipality
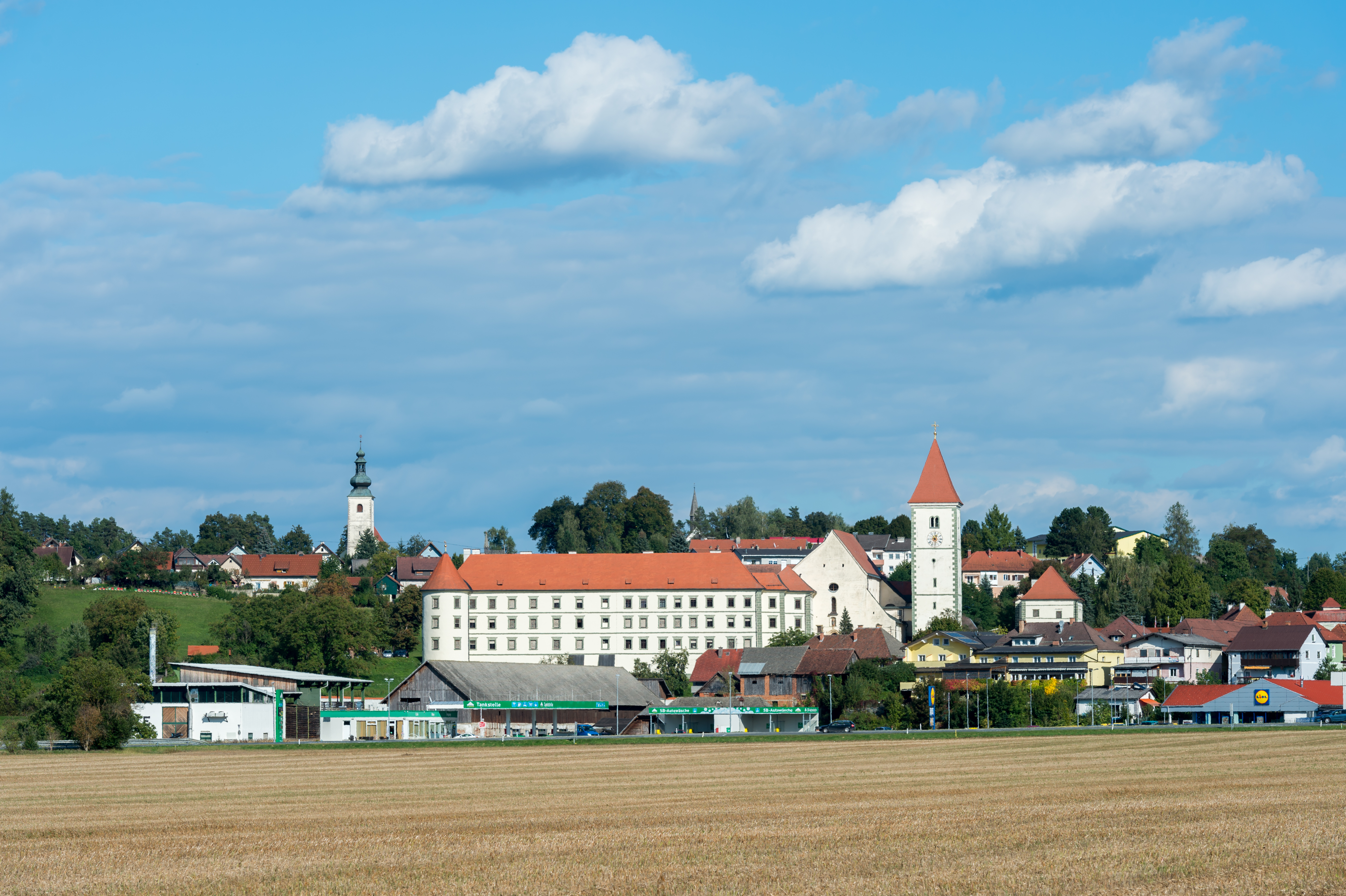
- Eberndorf Abbey

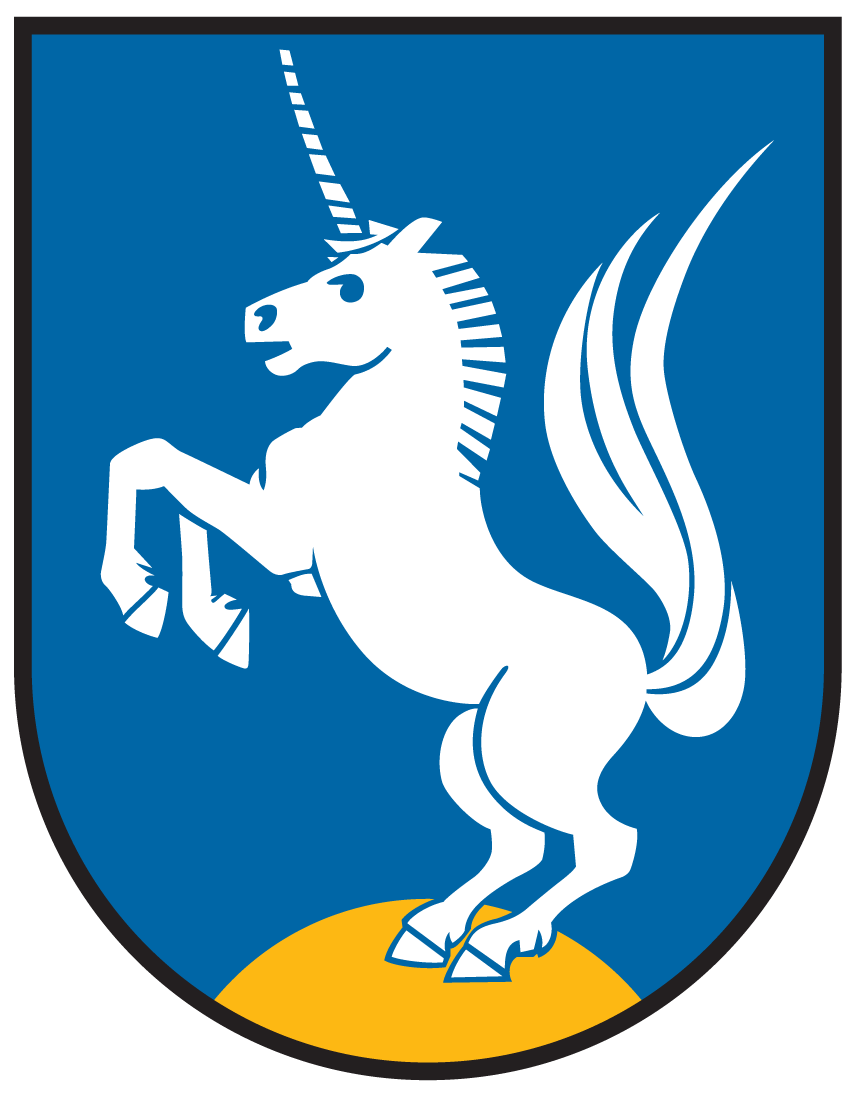
- Coat of arms

- Location within Austria
- Coordinates: 46°35′N 14°38′E
- Country: Austria
- State: Carinthia
- District: Völkermarkt

Government
  - Mayor: Gottfried Wedenig (SPÖ)

Area
  - Total: 67.69 km^{2} (26.14 sq mi)
- Elevation: 516 m (1,693 ft)

Population (2018-01-01)
  - Total: 5,862
  - Density: 86.60/km^{2} (224.3/sq mi)
- Time zone: UTC+1 (CET)
  - Summer (DST): UTC+2 (CEST)
- Postal code: 9141
- Area code: 04236
- Website: www.eberndorf.at

Eberndorf (Slovene: Dobrla vas, archaically Dobrla ves) is a market town of the Völkermarkt District in Carinthia, Austria.

== Geography ==
It is the main settlement in the Jaun (Podjuna) Valley of the Drava River, east of the Carinthian capital Klagenfurt. Here the road from Völkermarkt leads uphill to the Karawanks mountain range and across the Seebergsattel Pass to Slovenia. The nearby lake Gösselsdorfer See is a popular destination for day-trippers in summer.

The municipal area includes the Katastralgemeinden Buchbrunn (Bukovje), Gablern (Lovanke), Gösselsdorf (Goselna vas), Kühnsdorf (Sinča vas), Loibegg (Belovče), Mittlern (Metlova), Mökriach (Mokrije) and Pribelsdorf (Priblja vas). At the 2001 census 8.6% of the population were Carinthian Slovenes.

== History ==
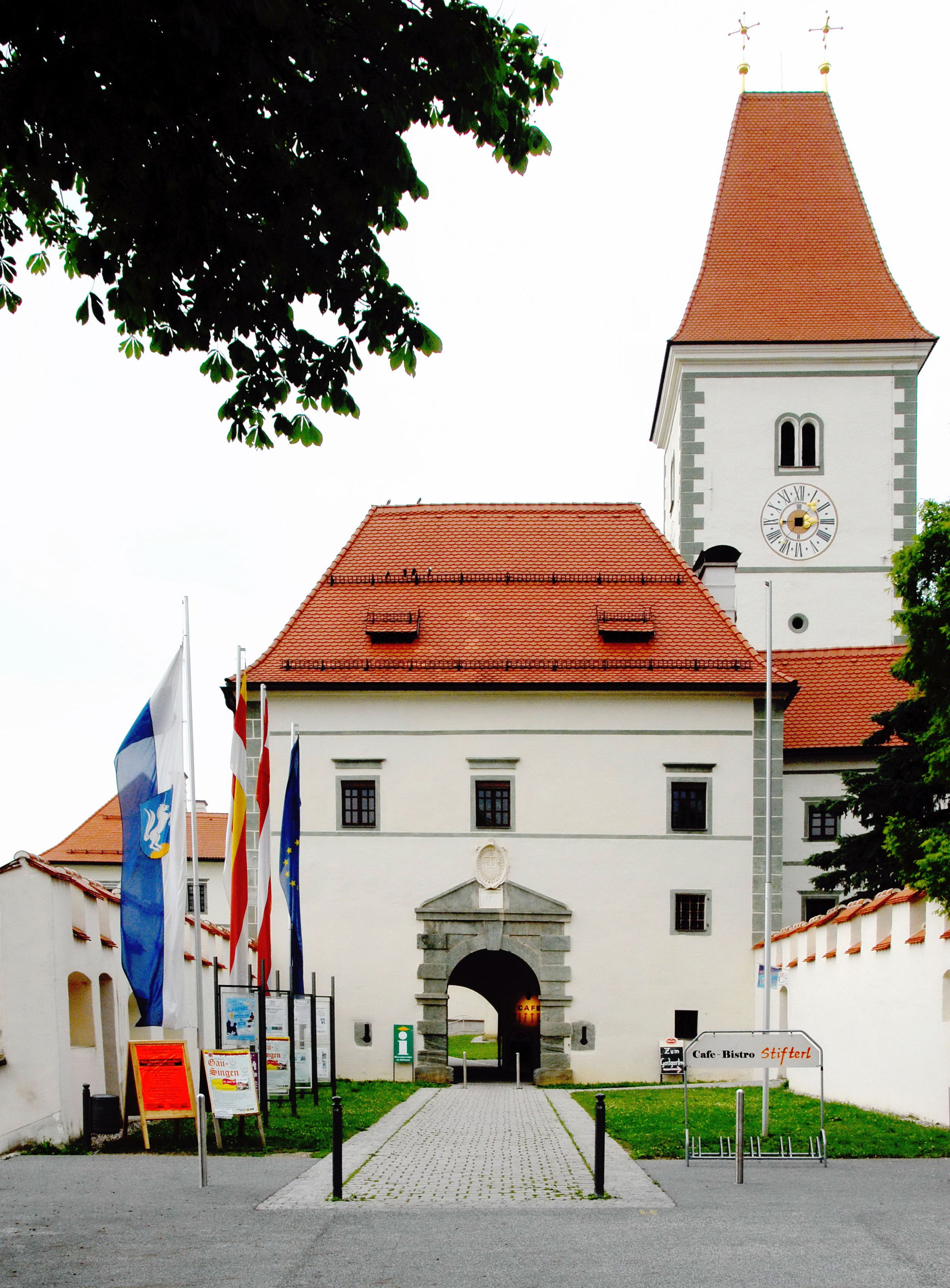
Eberndorf Abbey: gate and parish church

In the late 11th century the Aribonid count Kazelin (Chazelinus) founded Eberndorf Abbey within the Duchy of Carinthia. Patriarch Ulrich von Aquileia confirmed the establishment in an 1106 deed concerning the translation of the count's mortal remains to the newly built monastery church. In the mid 12th century, Patriarch Pilgrim of Aquileia had the premises enlarged as a Canons Regular community. From 1473, the buildings were devastated by Ottoman incursions and a fire, the reconstruction was supervised by Provost Leonhard von Keutschach, the later Prince-Archbishop of Salzburg.

In the course of the Counter-Reformation, the Augustinian community was dissolved by Pope Clement VIII in 1604. The Habsburg archduke Ferdinand II, ruler of the Inner Austrian lands, had urged him to install a Jesuit residence here. The monastery was secularised after the suppression of the Society of Jesus in 1773. In 1809 it was dedicated to the Benedictine St. Paul's Abbey in the Lavanttal.

The present-day municipality was established after the 1848 revolutions. The villages of Globasnitz, Rückersdorf and Sittersdorf were split off in 1876. A narrow-gauge railway line leading from Völkermarkt via Eberndorf to Eisenkappel opened in 1902, it was dismantled in 1971. The municipality received market rights in 1952.

== Politics ==
Seats in the municipal assembly (Gemeinderat) at the 2015 elections:

- Social Democratic Party of Austria (SPÖ): 12
- Austrian People's Party (ÖVP): 5
- Freedom Party of Austria (FPÖ): 3
- Unity List (EL): 3

== Notable people ==
Eberndorf is the birthplace of the Slovene novelist Mimi Malenšek (1919–2012) and the hometown of the prominent lawyer, human rights activist, and politician Rudi Vouk.
