= Bukovje, Dravograd =

Bukovje
- Location in Slovenia
- Coordinates: 46°35′40″N 15°02′35″E
- Country: Slovenia
- Traditional region: Styria
- Statistical region: Carinthia
- Municipality: Dravograd

Area
  - Total: 2.4 km^{2} (0.93 sq mi)

Population (2020)
  - Total: 65
  - Density: 27/km^{2} (70/sq mi)

Bukovje is a village along the road linking the town of Dravograd and the settlement of Trbonje, northeast of Dravograd, along the southern bank of the Drava River, in northeastern Slovenia. The village is part of the traditional region of Styria and is, as part of the Municipality of Dravograd, included in the Carinthia Statistical Region. It was established in 2004, when it ceded from the settlement of Otiški Vrh.

== Landmarks ==
=== Puchenstein Castle ===
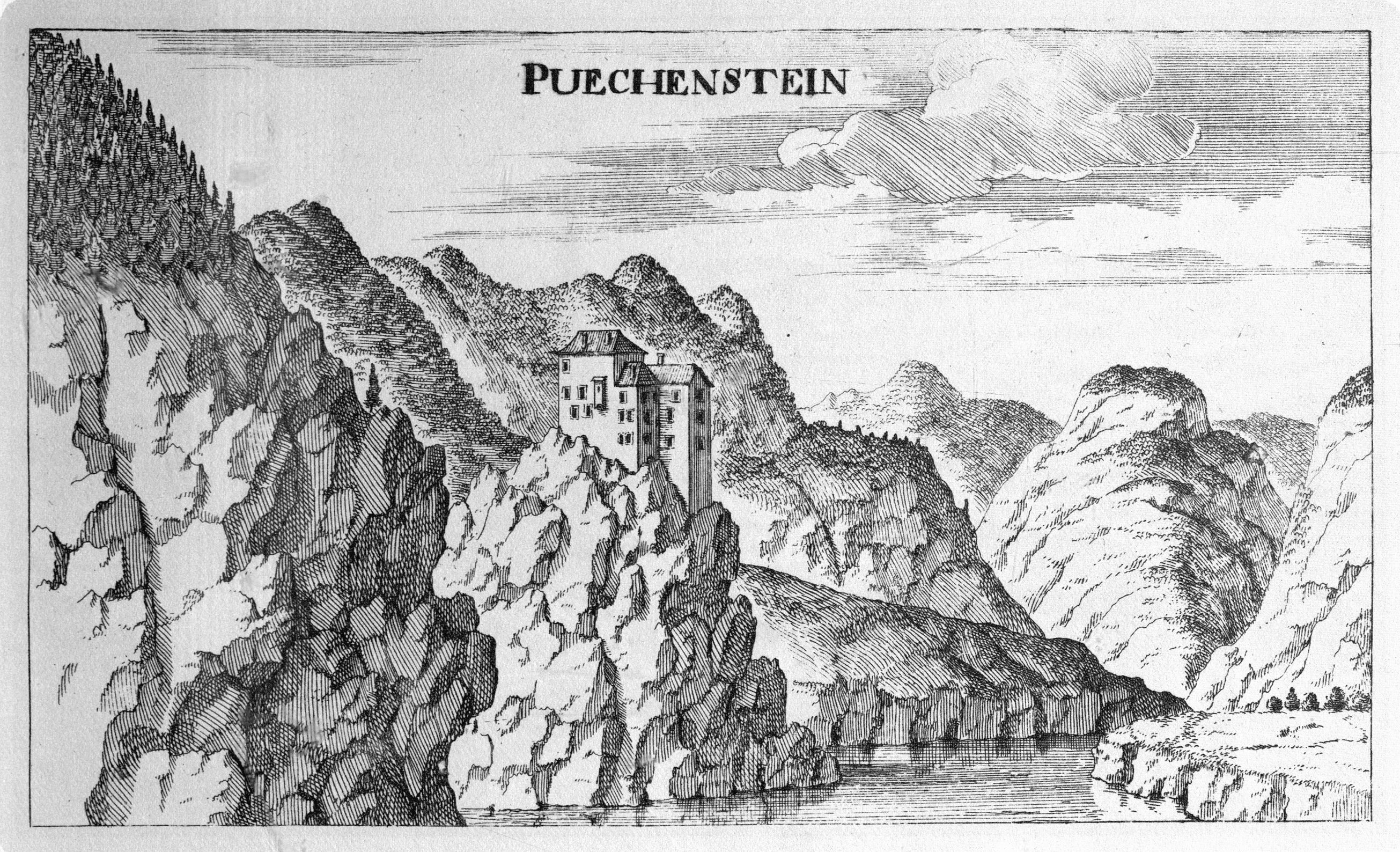
Puchenstein Castle

Puchenstein Castle (Slovene: grad Pukštajn) on Pukštajn Peak (Pukštajnski vrh) dates to the 13th century. It was severely damaged in a 1706 fire. Only ruins have been preserved until today.

=== Puchenstein Mansion ===
The Baroque Puchenstein Mansion (dvorec Pukštajn) in the settlement dates to ca. 1710. Today, it is used for wedding ceremonies and as a cultural venue. The chapel of the mansion has been protected as a cultural monument. In Yugoslavia, it was used as barracks of the Yugoslav People's Army, and was owned by the Slovenian Ministry of Defence until 2008.
