= Podklanc =

- Location in Slovenia
- Coordinates: 46°34′33.92″N 15°1′12.38″E
- Country: Slovenia
- Traditional region: Carinthia
- Statistical region: Carinthia
- Municipality: Dravograd

Area
  - Total: 0.69 km^{2} (0.27 sq mi)
- Elevation: 361.8 m (1,187 ft)

Population (2020)
  - Total: 143
  - Density: 210/km^{2} (540/sq mi)

Podklanc (pronounced [ˈpoːtklants]) is a settlement on the left bank of the Meža River south of Dravograd in the Carinthia region in northern Slovenia.
