= Kozji Vrh nad Dravogradom =

Kozji Vrh nad Dravogradom Kozji Vrh (until 1955)
- Location in Slovenia
- Coordinates: 46°37′34.55″N 15°4′55.76″E
- Country: Slovenia
- Traditional region: Carinthia
- Statistical region: Carinthia
- Municipality: Dravograd

Area
  - Total: 8.37 km^{2} (3.23 sq mi)
- Elevation: 888.1 m (2,914 ft)

Population (2020)
  - Total: 89
  - Density: 11/km^{2} (28/sq mi)

Kozji Vrh nad Dravogradom (pronounced [ˈkoːzji ˈʋəɾx nad ˈdɾaːʋɔɡɾadɔm]) is a dispersed settlement in the hills northeast of Dravograd in the Carinthia region in northern Slovenia, on the border with Austria.

== Name ==
The name of the settlement was changed from Kozji Vrh to Kozji Vrh nad Dravogradom in 1955.

== Churches ==
There are two churches in the settlement. The church south of the settlement, close to the banks of the Drava River, is dedicated to Mary Magdalene and was dedicated in 1384. It belongs to the Parish of Dravograd. The church in the north of the settlement, close to the Austrian border, is dedicated to Saint Urban. It was built in the 1990s on the location of an older church built in 1825.
