= Sveti Danijel =

- Location in Slovenia
- Coordinates: 46°34′49.97″N 15°5′57.98″E
- Country: Slovenia
- Traditional region: Carinthia
- Statistical region: Carinthia
- Municipality: Dravograd

Area
  - Total: 13 km^{2} (5.0 sq mi)
- Elevation: 409.1 m (1,342 ft)

Population (2020)
  - Total: 486
  - Density: 37/km^{2} (97/sq mi)

Sveti Danijel (pronounced [ˈsʋeːti ˈdaːnijɛl]) is a dispersed settlement in the hills east of Dravograd in the Carinthia region in northern Slovenia.

The local church, from which the settlement gets its name, is dedicated to the Prophet Daniel. It was built in 1625 on the site of an earlier Gothic church. It was also extensively rebuilt after fires in 1644 and in 1780. It belongs to the Parish of Trbonje.
