= Sveti Duh, Dravograd =

Sveti Duh
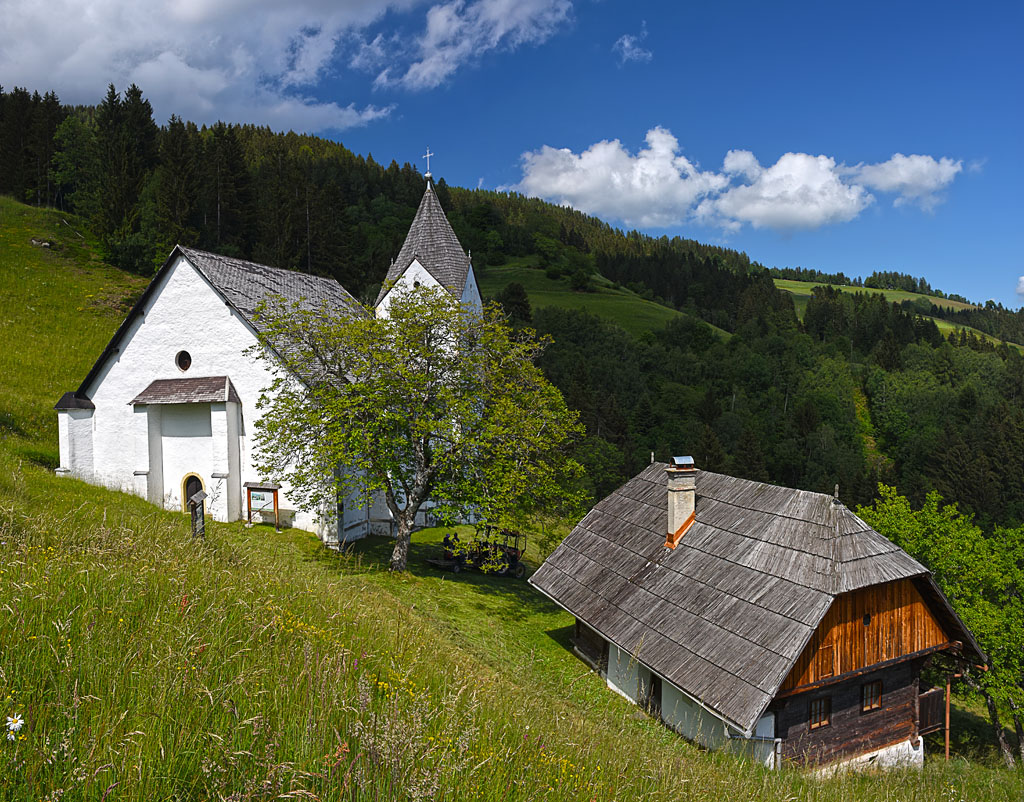

- Location in Slovenia
- Coordinates: 46°37′3.52″N 15°3′5.25″E
- Country: Slovenia
- Traditional region: Carinthia
- Statistical region: Carinthia
- Municipality: Dravograd

Area
  - Total: 4.81 km^{2} (1.86 sq mi)
- Elevation: 820.5 m (2,692 ft)

Population (2020)
  - Total: 101
  - Density: 21.0/km^{2} (54.4/sq mi)

Sveti Duh (pronounced [ˈsʋeːti ˈduːx]) is a dispersed settlement in the hills northeast of Dravograd in the Carinthia region in northern Slovenia.

== Church ==
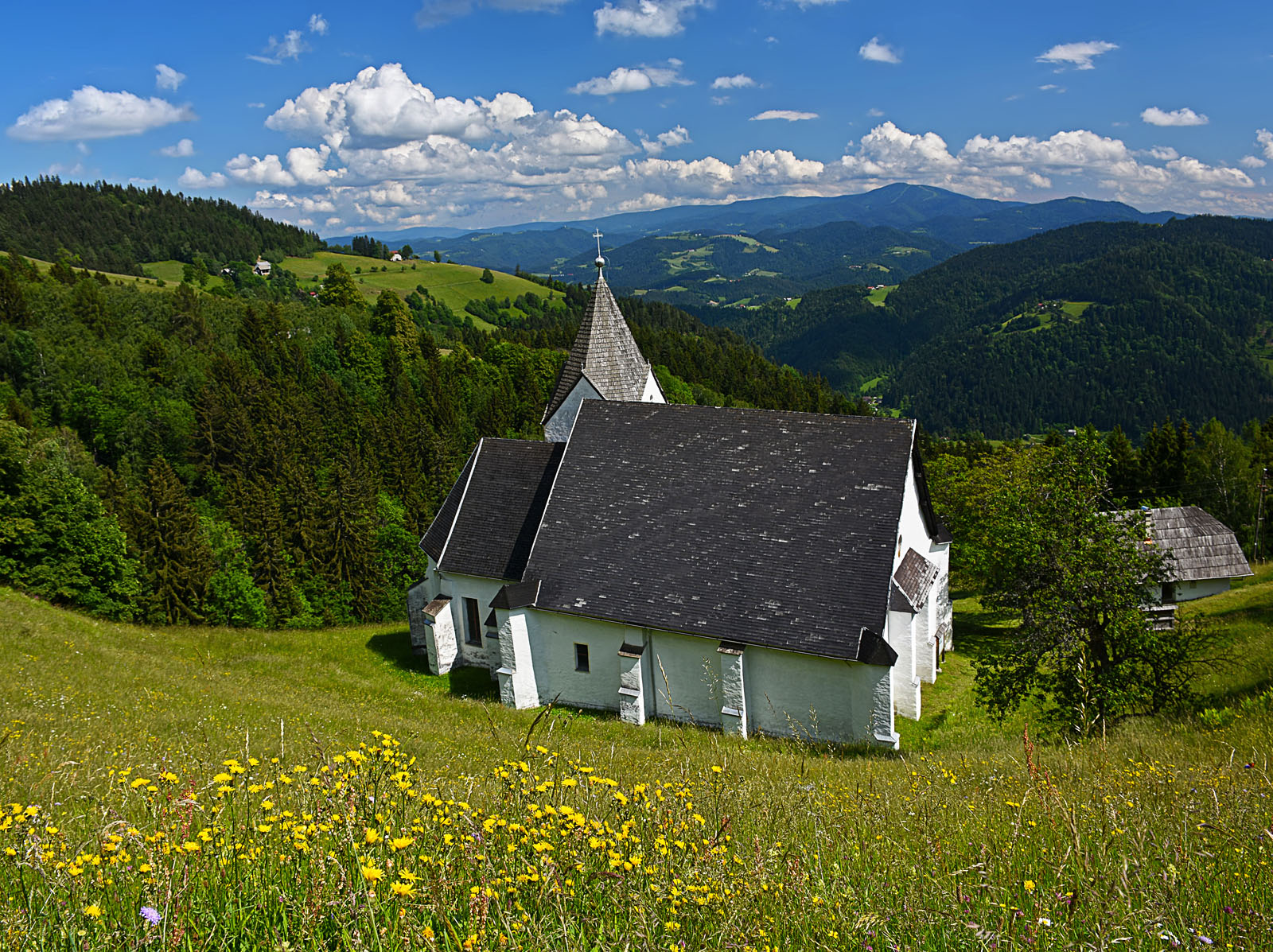
Holy Spirit Church

The local church, from which the settlement gets its name, is dedicated to the Holy Spirit (Slovene: Sveti Duh). It was first mentioned in written documents dating to 1616. It is an early 16th-century building with an early 17th-century painted wooden ceiling that belongs to the Parish of Ojstrica.
