= Tribej =

- Location in Slovenia
- Coordinates: 46°35′51.01″N 14°58′47.22″E
- Country: Slovenia
- Traditional region: Carinthia
- Statistical region: Carinthia
- Municipality: Dravograd

Area
  - Total: 1.81 km^{2} (0.70 sq mi)
- Elevation: 392.3 m (1,287 ft)

Population (2020)
  - Total: 111
  - Density: 61.3/km^{2} (159/sq mi)

Tribej (pronounced [ˈtɾiːbɛi̯]) is a small settlement on the right bank of the Drava River west of Dravograd in the Carinthia region in northern Slovenia, next to the border with Austria.
