= Črneče =

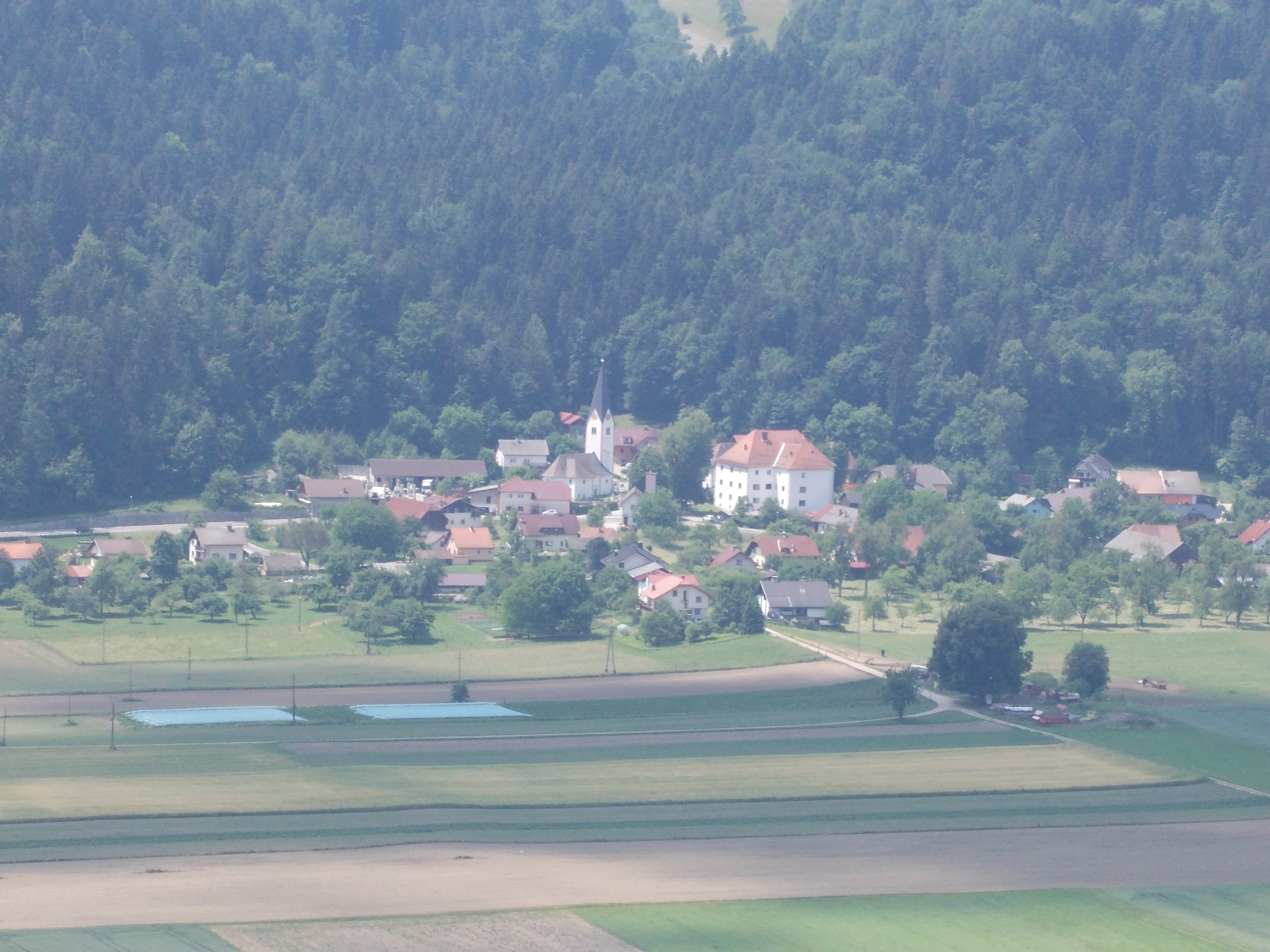
- Črneče from Dravograd Castle

- Location in Slovenia
- Coordinates: 46°35′6.32″N 15°0′15.09″E
- Country: Slovenia
- Traditional region: Carinthia
- Statistical region: Carinthia
- Municipality: Dravograd

Area
  - Total: 2.35 km^{2} (0.91 sq mi)
- Elevation: 350.4 m (1,150 ft)

Population (2020)
  - Total: 648
  - Density: 276/km^{2} (714/sq mi)

Črneče (pronounced [tʃəɾˈneːtʃɛ]) is a village on the right bank of the Drava River in the Municipality of Dravograd in the Carinthia region in northern Slovenia.

== Church ==
The local church in the centre of the settlement is dedicated to Saint Andrew and Saint James and dates to the early 15th century with some later rebuilding.

== Castle ==
Close to the church there is a castle from the 15th century, first mentioned in 1408. In 1432, the castle was mentioned under the name Tscherberg. In the second half of the 17th century, the castle was owned by Adam Seyfrid Waldner. In 1936, ownership was transferred to Catholic nuns from Slovenska Bistrica. After the Second World War it was nationalized, and a cultural hall and apartments were arranged in the castle.

== Lake Dravograd ==
Lake Dravograd (Slovene: Dravograjsko jezero, Črneško jezero) lies east of the village. This reservoir was created after the Dravograd Hydroelectric Power Plant was built in 1944 and is located between Črneče and Dravograd. The shallow southern part on the Črneče side contains several shallow branches of the Drava River with reed-covered islands, and the main course of the river is to the north, below Dravograd.

The southern wetlands are an important natural habitat, because of which the area of Lake Dravograd was included in Natura 2000 as a protected area. More than 150 bird species have been observed here, the most common including the mute swan, grey heron, mallard Eurasian coot, sedge warbler, great reed warbler, common moorhen, and great crested grebe. The lake is an important stop for migrating birds, and a spawning ground for native fish and amphibians. Common fish species found here are the tench, common carp, European chub, common bream, common barbel, and northern pike. Fishing is widespread in the area and is also allowed around the lake. Typical amphibians of the region include the common toad, common frog, and European tree frog. Reptile species commonly found in the region include the grass snake, dice snake, horned viper, Aesculapian snake, European green lizard, and common wall lizard. Around 2000, the Eurasian beaver spread from lower parts of the Drava River and settled around the lake.

The flora is also diverse, and more than 160 plant species are known in the area. The dominant plant on the islands between the main flow and branches is reeds, forming extensive reed beds. Other typical plants from the area include Rumex aquaticus, yellow iris, celery-leaved buttercup, sweet flag, cowbane, common bulrush, willow, and common aspen.

== History ==
During World War II, German forces attacked the Kingdom of Yugoslavia on April 6, 1941. On April 10, German forces reached Dravograd, crossed the Drava River on April 11, and continued their breakthrough towards Slovenj Gradec and Celje. Resistance was provided by scant Yugoslav forces along the Rupnik Line, which crossed Črneče and Dravograd, and could not significantly delay the advance of the Germans.

Later during the war, Russian prisoners of war building the Dravograd Hydroelectric Power Plant were stationed near Črneče. About 400 prisoners were transferred here from the POW camp in Wolfsberg. The prisoners lived in poor conditions and more of 100 of them died in just two months due to hunger and exhaustion. A memorial to 197 Russian prisoners is located in Črneče.

== Notable people ==
Notable people that were born or lived in Črneče include:

- Berta Jereb (born 1925), pediatric oncologist
