= Dobrova pri Dravogradu =

Dobrova pri Dravogradu Dobrova (until 1955)
- Location in Slovenia
- Coordinates: 46°34′37.17″N 15°0′51.72″E
- Country: Slovenia
- Traditional region: Carinthia
- Statistical region: Carinthia
- Municipality: Dravograd

Area
  - Total: 1.72 km^{2} (0.66 sq mi)
- Elevation: 409.3 m (1,343 ft)

Population (2020)
  - Total: 169
  - Density: 98.3/km^{2} (254/sq mi)

Dobrova pri Dravogradu (pronounced [ˈdoːbɾɔʋa pɾi ˈdɾaːʋɔɡɾadu]) is a village south of Dravograd in the Carinthia region in northern Slovenia.

== Name ==
The name of the settlement was changed from Dobrova to Dobrova pri Dravogradu in 1955.

== Church ==
The local church is built on a small hill south of the main settlement. It is dedicated to the Holy Cross. It was built in 1845.
