= Črneška Gora =

- Location in Slovenia
- Coordinates: 46°35′13.12″N 14°58′36.9″E
- Country: Slovenia
- Traditional region: Carinthia
- Statistical region: Carinthia
- Municipality: Dravograd

Area
  - Total: 5.9 km^{2} (2.3 sq mi)
- Elevation: 693.3 m (2,275 ft)

Population (2020)
  - Total: 48
  - Density: 8.1/km^{2} (21/sq mi)

Črneška Gora (pronounced [tʃəɾˈneːʃka ˈɡɔːɾa]) is a dispersed settlement in the hills above the left bank of the Drava River in the Municipality of Dravograd in the Carinthia region in northern Slovenia.
