= Libeliška Gora =

- Location in Slovenia
- Coordinates: 46°36′26.6″N 14°56′37.5″E
- Country: Slovenia
- Traditional region: Carinthia
- Statistical region: Carinthia
- Municipality: Dravograd

Area
  - Total: 6.22 km^{2} (2.40 sq mi)
- Elevation: 516.7 m (1,695 ft)

Population (2020)
  - Total: 176
  - Density: 28.3/km^{2} (73.3/sq mi)

Libeliška Gora (pronounced [libɛˈliːʃka ˈɡɔːɾa]) is a dispersed settlement in the hills south of Libeliče in the Municipality of Dravograd in the Carinthia region in northern Slovenia, right on the border with Austria.
