= Goriški Vrh =

- Location in Slovenia
- Coordinates: 46°37′20.73″N 15°0′58.82″E
- Country: Slovenia
- Traditional region: Carinthia
- Statistical region: Carinthia
- Municipality: Dravograd

Area
  - Total: 10.47 km^{2} (4.04 sq mi)
- Elevation: 1,005.9 m (3,300 ft)

Population (2020)
  - Total: 266
  - Density: 25.4/km^{2} (65.8/sq mi)

Goriški Vrh (pronounced [ɡɔˈɾiːʃki ˈʋəɾx]) is a dispersed settlement in the hills north of Dravograd in the Carinthia region in northern Slovenia, right on the border with Austria.
