= Velka =

- Location in Slovenia
- Coordinates: 46°37′45.3″N 15°3′13.29″E
- Country: Slovenia
- Traditional region: Carinthia
- Statistical region: Carinthia
- Municipality: Dravograd

Area
  - Total: 4.18 km^{2} (1.61 sq mi)
- Elevation: 1,010.1 m (3,314 ft)

Population (2020)
  - Total: 44
  - Density: 11/km^{2} (27/sq mi)

Velka (pronounced [ˈʋeːlka]) is a dispersed settlement in the hills to the northeast of Dravograd in the Carinthia region in northern Slovenia, next to the border with Austria.
