= Vič, Dravograd =

Vič
- Location in Slovenia
- Coordinates: 46°36′5.27″N 14°59′55.83″E
- Country: Slovenia
- Traditional region: Carinthia
- Statistical region: Carinthia
- Municipality: Dravograd

Area
  - Total: 2.02 km^{2} (0.78 sq mi)
- Elevation: 417.1 m (1,368 ft)

Population (2020)
  - Total: 279
  - Density: 138/km^{2} (358/sq mi)

Vič (pronounced [ˈʋiːtʃ]) is a village on the left bank of the Drava River in the Municipality of Dravograd in the Carinthia region in northern Slovenia, next to the border with Austria.

The local church in the centre of the village is dedicated to Saint Leonard. It was first mentioned in written documents dating to 1493. The current building is a combination of a belfry built in 1528, an early 18th-century nave, and two later chapels. It belongs to the Parish of Dravograd.
