= Sveti Boštjan =

- Location in Slovenia
- Coordinates: 46°36′4.57″N 15°3′20.7″E
- Country: Slovenia
- Traditional region: Carinthia
- Statistical region: Carinthia
- Municipality: Dravograd

Area
  - Total: 0.55 km^{2} (0.21 sq mi)
- Elevation: 350.4 m (1,150 ft)

Population (2020)
  - Total: 115
  - Density: 210/km^{2} (540/sq mi)

Sveti Boštjan (pronounced [ˈsʋeːti bɔˈʃtjaːn]) is a small village on the right bank of the Drava River in the Municipality of Dravograd in the Carinthia region in northern Slovenia.

The local church, from which the settlement gets its name, is dedicated to Saint Sebastian (Slovene: sveti Boštjan) and Saint Roch. The originally Late Gothic church was extended in the 16th and 17th centuries. It belongs to the Parish of Dravograd.
