= Jereb =

Jereb is a surname. Notable people with the surname include:

- Andraž Jereb (born 1992), Slovenian judoka
- Berta Jereb (born 1925), Slovenian oncologist and radiotherapist
- Sašo Jereb (born 1983), Slovenian judoka
- Žana Jereb (born 1984), Slovenian long-distance runner
