= Gorče =

- Location in Slovenia
- Coordinates: 46°37′17.14″N 14°57′13.65″E
- Country: Slovenia
- Traditional region: Carinthia
- Statistical region: Carinthia
- Municipality: Dravograd

Area
  - Total: 2.78 km^{2} (1.07 sq mi)
- Elevation: 423.5 m (1,389 ft)

Population (2020)
  - Total: 122
  - Density: 43.9/km^{2} (114/sq mi)

Gorče (pronounced [ˈɡɔːɾtʃɛ]) is a small settlement on a river terrace above the right bank of the Drava River in the Municipality of Dravograd in the Carinthia region in northern Slovenia, right on the border with Austria.
