= Bukovska Vas =

- Location in Slovenia
- Coordinates: 46°32′56.4″N 15°2′59.85″E
- Country: Slovenia
- Traditional region: Carinthia
- Statistical region: Carinthia
- Municipality: Dravograd

Area
  - Total: 1.32 km^{2} (0.51 sq mi)
- Elevation: 363 m (1,191 ft)

Population (2020)
  - Total: 355
  - Density: 269/km^{2} (697/sq mi)

Bukovska Vas (pronounced [buˈkoːu̯ska ˈʋaːs]; Slovene: Bukovska vas, German: Buchdorf) is a settlement on the left bank of the Mislinja River in the Municipality of Dravograd in the Carinthia region in northern Slovenia. It includes the hamlet of Sveta Jedrt (or Sveta Jedert).

== Name ==
Bukovska Vas was first mentioned in written sources in 1168 as Půchdorf. The name is interpreted locally as referring to former forests of beech trees (Slovene: bukev) or to large farms where unschooled writers lived (Slovene: bukovniki).

== History ==
In the 12th century, Bukovska Vas was a possession of St. Paul's Abbey in the Lavant Valley. In the 16th century, the settlement belonged to Püchenstein Castle (Slovene: Puhštanj, Puhenštanj, Pukštanj) and it had 15 farms and a mill along the Mislinja River.

=== Mass grave ===
Bukovska Vas is the site of a mass grave from the period immediately after the Second World War. The House No. 35 Mass Grave (Slovene: Grobišče pri hiši 35) is located in the woods south of the village. It contains the remains of a number of Croatians murdered in the second half of May 1945.

== Church ==
The church in Bukovska Vas is dedicated to Saint Gertrude (Slovene: sveta Jedrt). It was first mentioned in written sources in 1278. It is furnished in the Baroque style and has a late Romanesque rectangular rib-vaulted chancel. A Gothic sculpture of Saint Gertrude dates to circa 1440, and a sculpture of the Lamb of God in a side niche to circa 1300.
