= Ojstrica, Dravograd =

Ojstrica
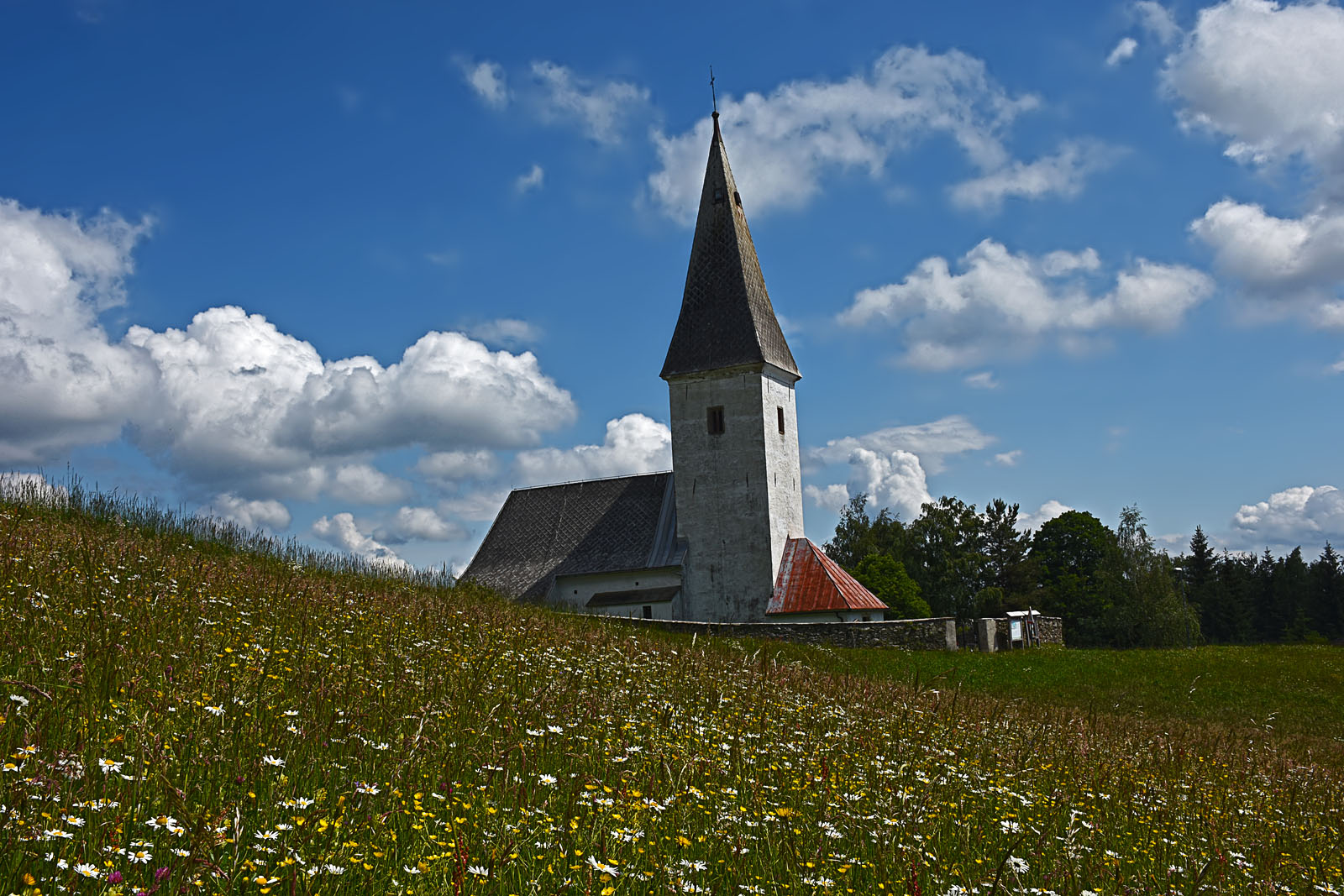

- Location in Slovenia
- Coordinates: 46°37′9.05″N 15°2′9.32″E
- Country: Slovenia
- Traditional region: Carinthia
- Statistical region: Carinthia
- Municipality: Dravograd

Area
  - Total: 6.36 km^{2} (2.46 sq mi)
- Elevation: 982.5 m (3,223 ft)

Population (2020)
  - Total: 101
  - Density: 15.9/km^{2} (41.1/sq mi)

Ojstrica (pronounced [ˈoːi̯stritsa]) is a dispersed settlement in the hills north of Dravograd in the Carinthia region in northern Slovenia.

The parish church in the settlement is dedicated to John the Baptist and belongs to the Roman Catholic Archdiocese of Maribor. It dates to 1480 with various later additions.

== Gallery ==
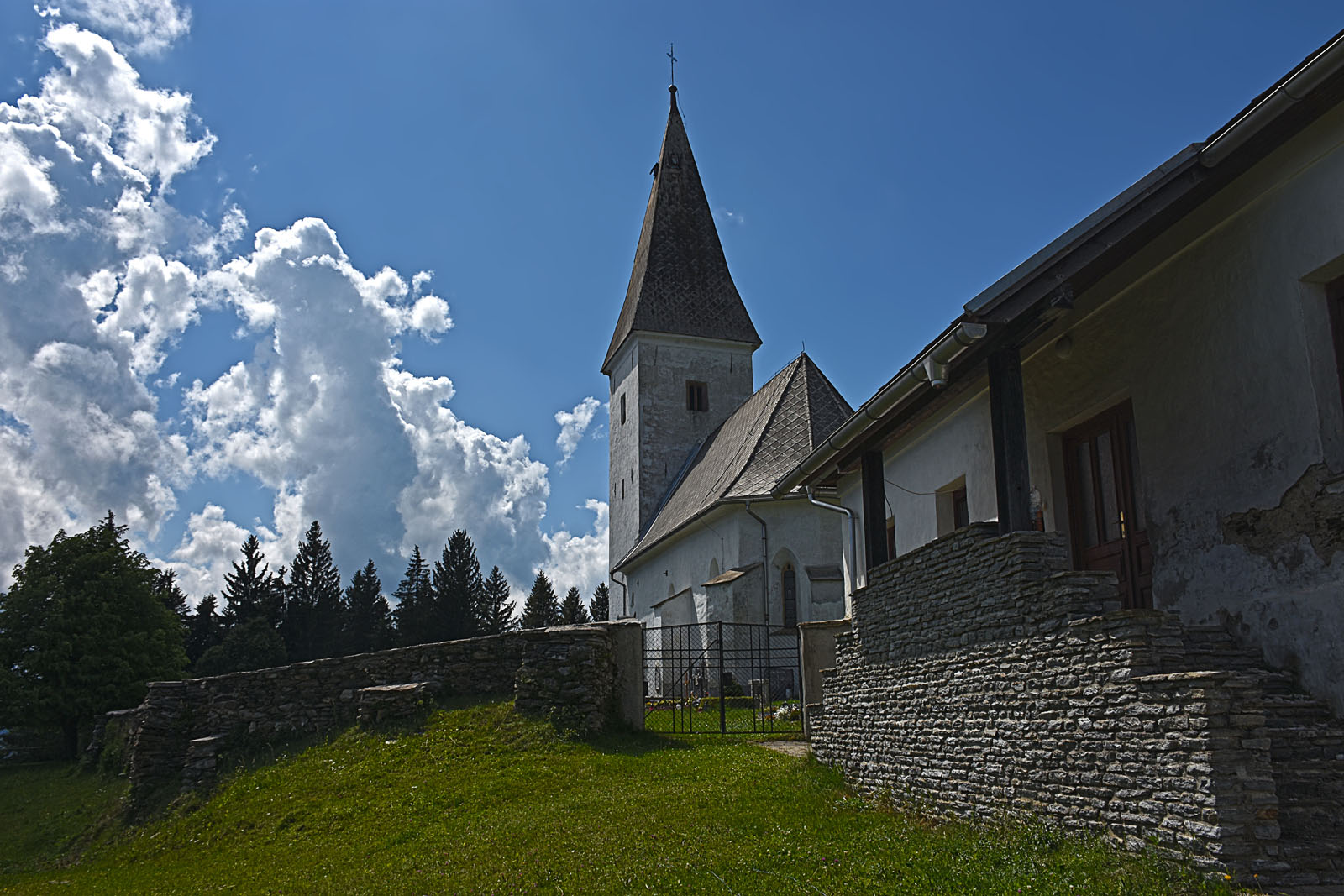
St. John the Baptist Church
