= Otiški Vrh =

- Location in Slovenia
- Coordinates: 46°34′18.69″N 15°2′5.45″E
- Country: Slovenia
- Traditional region: Styria
- Statistical region: Carinthia
- Municipality: Dravograd

Area
  - Total: 11.12 km^{2} (4.29 sq mi)
- Elevation: 345.7 m (1,134 ft)

Population (2020)
  - Total: 896
  - Density: 80.6/km^{2} (209/sq mi)

Otiški Vrh (pronounced [ɔˈtiːʃki ˈʋəɾx], in older sources also Otišni vrh, German: Ottischnigberg) is a dispersed settlement in the hills southeast of Dravograd in the Styria region in northern Slovenia.

== Geography ==
The Mislinja River joins the Meža River from the right north of the village of Otiški Vrh, only a couple of hundred meters before the Meža joins the Drava River.

== History ==
In 2004, the settlement of Bukovje was administratively separated from Otiški Vrh.

=== Mass grave ===
Otiški Vrh is the site of a mass grave associated with the Second World War. The Bavh Mass Grave (Slovene: Grobišče Pod Bavhom) is located below the Bavh farm in the western part of the settlement, 300 meters (980 ft) northeast of the main road, on the steep edge of a wooded slope by a large pine tree. It contains the remains of unidentified victims.

== Church ==
The parish church in the settlement is a pilgrimage church dedicated to Saint Peter. It is built on a hill known as Kronska gora, high above the Mislinja Valley. It is a Baroque building with a two-storey entrance facade and a double belfry built between 1745 and 1750. A second church to the east of the settlement is dedicated to Saint Oswald. It is a Late Gothic church with 17th-century wall paintings.
