= Šentjanž pri Dravogradu =

- Location in Slovenia
- Coordinates: 46°33′32.36″N 15°2′28.42″E
- Country: Slovenia
- Traditional region: Styria
- Statistical region: Carinthia
- Municipality: Dravograd

Area
  - Total: 1.47 km^{2} (0.57 sq mi)
- Elevation: 354.1 m (1,162 ft)

Population (2020)
  - Total: 507
  - Density: 345/km^{2} (893/sq mi)

Šentjanž pri Dravogradu (pronounced [sɛnˈtjaːnʃ pɾi ˈdɾaːʋɔɡɾadu] or [sənˈtjaːnʃ pɾi ˈdɾaːʋɔɡɾadu]) is a settlement on the left bank of the Mislinja River south of Dravograd in northern Slovenia, in the traditional region of Styria.

== Mass graves ==
Šentjanž pri Dravogradu is the site of two known mass graves associated with the Second World War. The Škitek 1 Mass Grave (Slovene: Grobišče Škitek 1) is located in a meadow 300 meters (980 ft) west of the church. It contains the remains of an unknown number of Croatian soldiers. The Škitek 2 Mass Grave (Grobišče Škitek 2) is located among some bushes next to a creek in a meadow 250 meters (820 ft) west of the church. It contains the remains of at least 62 Croatian soldiers.

== Church ==
The local parish church, from which the settlement gets its name, is dedicated to the John the Baptist. It was first mentioned in written documents dating to 1305. The current building dates to the 15th century with some later adaptations. It belongs to the Roman Catholic Archdiocese of Maribor.
