= Vrata, Dravograd =

Vrata
- Location in Slovenia
- Coordinates: 46°36′30.69″N 15°6′3.34″E
- Country: Slovenia
- Traditional region: Styria
- Statistical region: Carinthia
- Municipality: Dravograd

Area
  - Total: 3.2 km^{2} (1.2 sq mi)
- Elevation: 382.4 m (1,255 ft)

Population (2020)
  - Total: 108
  - Density: 34/km^{2} (87/sq mi)

Vrata (pronounced [ˈwɾaːta]) is a dispersed settlement in the hills above the left bank of the Drava River in the Municipality of Dravograd, historically part of the Styria, and now included in the Carinthia Statistical Region in northern Slovenia.
