= Selovec =

- Location in Slovenia
- Coordinates: 46°32′34.4″N 15°2′6.32″E
- Country: Slovenia
- Traditional region: Carinthia
- Statistical region: Carinthia
- Municipality: Dravograd

Area
  - Total: 7.59 km^{2} (2.93 sq mi)
- Elevation: 508 m (1,667 ft)

Population (2020)
  - Total: 501
  - Density: 66.0/km^{2} (171/sq mi)

Selovec (pronounced [sɛˈlɔːʋəts] or [sɛˈloːʋəts]) is a dispersed settlement in the hills south of Dravograd in the Carinthia region in northern Slovenia.

== Mass graves ==
Selovec is the site of three known mass graves or clandestine graves associated with the Second World War. The Jeglijenek Meadow Mass Grave (Slovene: Grobišče Jeglijenkov travnik) is located in a meadow 50 meters (160 ft) southeast of the house at Selovec no. 16. It is a clearly visible mound containing the remains of two soldiers: a Croatian and a Cossack. The Bricl Mass Grave (Grobišče Bricl) lies in a meadow 50 meters (160 ft) west of the Bricelj farm at Selovec no. 13. It contains the remains of five to 12 Croatian soldiers. The Zdih Woods Grave (Grobišče Zdihov gozd) is located 400 meters (1,300 ft) southwest of the house at Selovec no. 15. It contains the remains of one Croatian soldier.
