= Municipality of Dravograd =

Municipality of Slovenia

Municipality of Dravograd Občina Dravograd
- Municipality
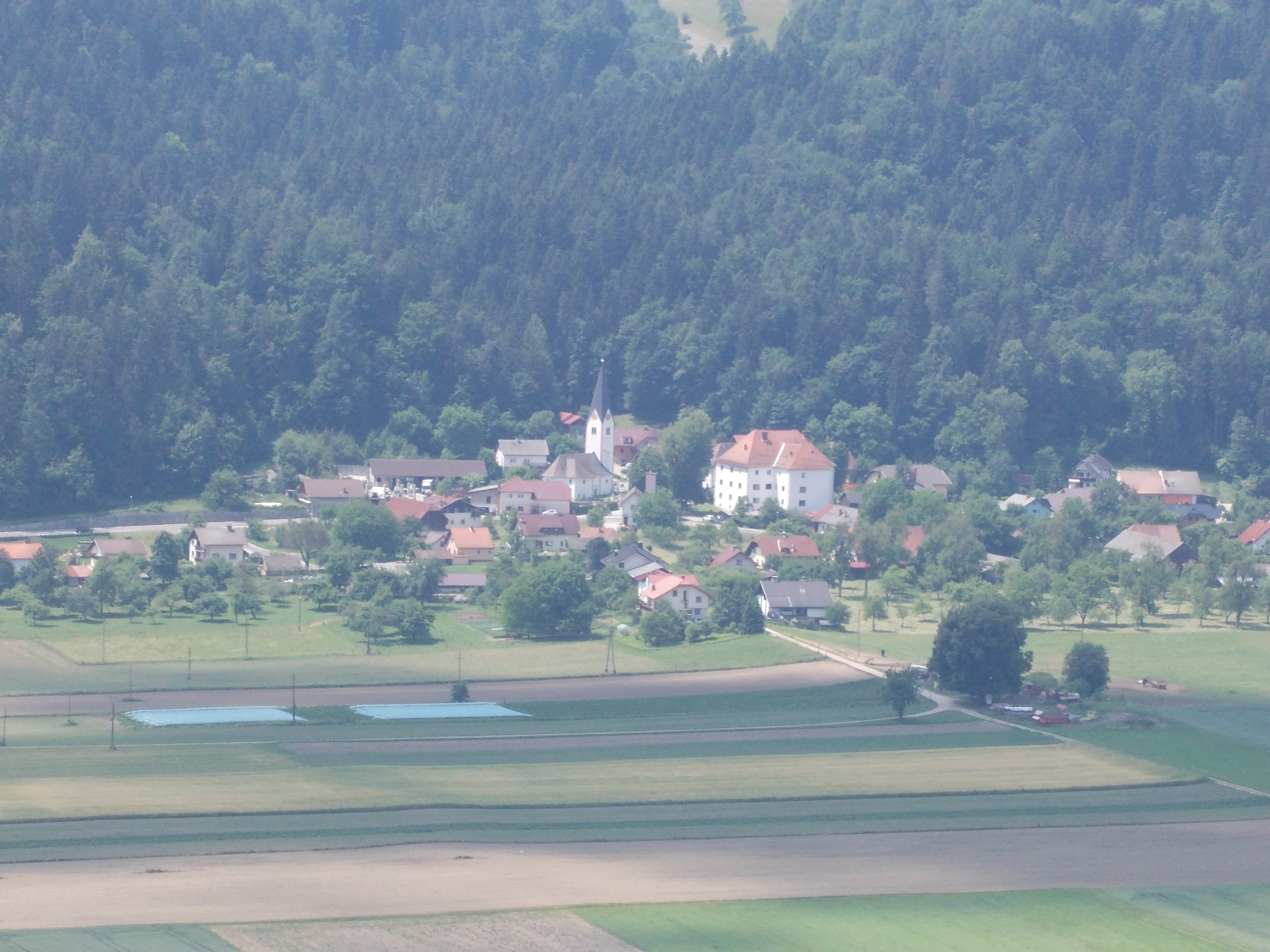

- Location of the Municipality of Dravograd in Slovenia
- Coordinates: 46°35′N 15°01′E
- Country: Slovenia

Government
  - Mayor: Anton Preksavec (Independent)

Area
  - Total: 105.0 km^{2} (40.5 sq mi)

Population (2002)
  - Total: 8,863
  - Density: 84.41/km^{2} (218.6/sq mi)
- Time zone: UTC+01 (CET)
  - Summer (DST): UTC+02 (CEST)
- Website: www.dravograd.si

The Municipality of Dravograd (pronounced [ˈdɾaːʋɔɡɾat]; Slovene: Občina Dravograd) is a municipality in northern Slovenia, on the border with Austria. The seat of the municipality is the town of Dravograd. The Drava River runs through the middle of the municipality. Most of its territory is part of the traditional Slovenian province of Carinthia, but a large southern and eastern part of its territory is part of the traditional Slovenian province of Styria. It is also part of the larger Carinthia Statistical Region.

== Settlements ==
In addition to the municipal seat of Dravograd, the municipality also includes the following settlements:

- Bukovje
- Bukovska Vas
- Črneče
- Črneška Gora
- Dobrova pri Dravogradu
- Gorče
- Goriški Vrh
- Kozji Vrh nad Dravogradom
- Libeliče
- Libeliška Gora
- Ojstrica
- Otiški Vrh
- Podklanc
- Selovec
- Šentjanž pri Dravogradu
- Sveti Boštjan
- Sveti Danijel
- Sveti Duh
- Tolsti Vrh pri Ravnah na Koroškem
- Trbonje
- Tribej
- Velka
- Vič
- Vrata

These settlements are grouped into five local communities: Dravograd, Črneče, Libeliče, Šentjanž pri Dravogradu, and Trbonje.
