= Poljana, Prevalje =

Poljana
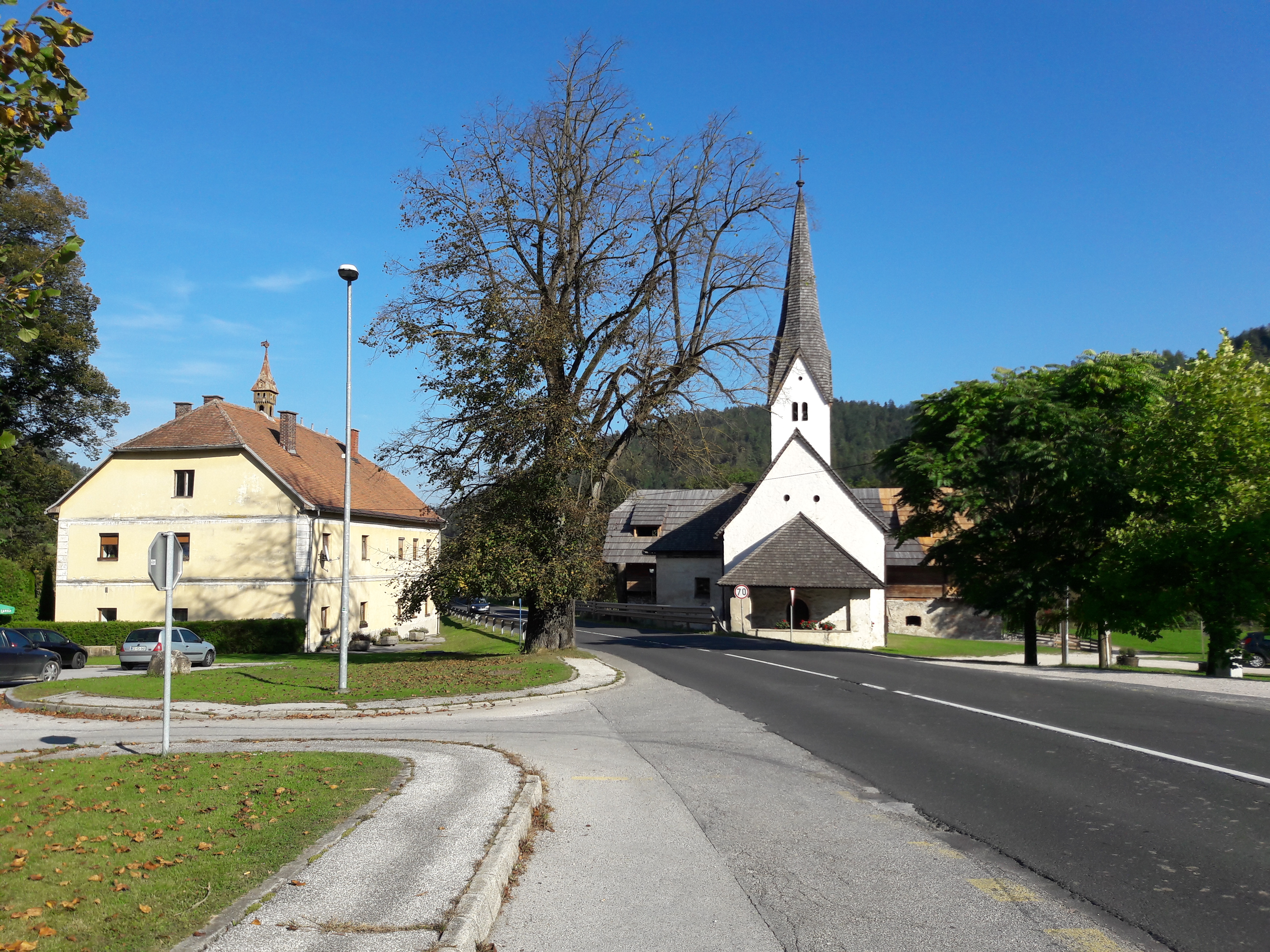

- Location in Slovenia
- Coordinates: 46°32′40″N 14°52′25.19″E
- Country: Slovenia
- Traditional region: Carinthia
- Statistical region: Carinthia
- Municipality: Prevalje

Area
  - Total: 2.31 km^{2} (0.89 sq mi)
- Elevation: 446.2 m (1,464 ft)

Population (2002)
  - Total: 139

Poljana (pronounced [pɔˈljaːna]) is a settlement on the left bank of the Meža River in the Municipality of Prevalje in the Carinthia region in northern Slovenia, close to the border with Austria.

== History ==
Poljana was the site of the Battle of Poljana in May 1945, the last significant clash of arms of World War II in the European theater.

=== Mass grave ===
Poljana is the site of a mass grave from the end of the Second World War. The Poljana Mass Grave (Slovene: Grobišče Poljana) is located southwest of the village, between the road and the Meža River. It contains the remains of an undetermined number of Croatian soldiers killed in the Battle of Poljana and possibly also civilians that were liquidated after the surrender on 15 May 1945.

== Church ==
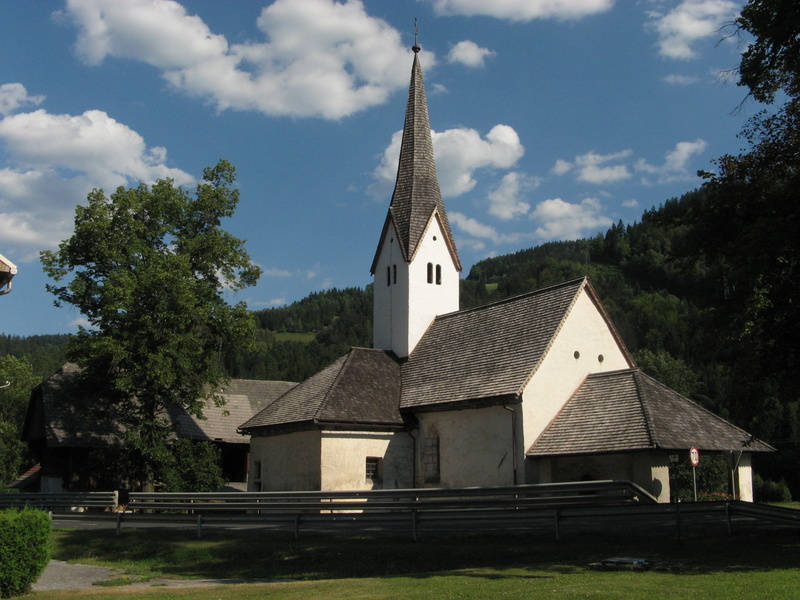
St. John the Baptist Church in Poljana

The local church is dedicated to John the Baptist. It dates to the early 14th century and is an early Gothic church preserved with very few adaptations. Its internal furnishings date to 1640. It belongs to the Parish of Prevalje.
