= Trbonje =

- Location in Slovenia
- Coordinates: 46°36′3.14″N 15°6′18.32″E
- Country: Slovenia
- Traditional region: Styria
- Statistical region: Carinthia
- Municipality: Dravograd

Area
  - Total: 2.2 km^{2} (0.85 sq mi)
- Elevation: 392 m (1,286 ft)

Population (2020)
  - Total: 215
  - Density: 98/km^{2} (250/sq mi)

Trbonje (pronounced [təɾˈboːnjɛ]) is a village on the right bank of the Drava River east of Dravograd in the Slovenia Styria region in northern Slovenia.

== Name ==
Trbonje was mentioned in written sources in 1251 as in Trebv̊enne (and as Trefunn in 1345, ze Trafim in 1376, zu Traffn in 1377, and datz Trafnn in 1378). The Slovene name is a feminine plural noun today, but this is not confirmed by the medieval sources. It is therefore hypothesized that the name is a deadjectival derived through ellipsis from *Trěbon′e selo (literally, 'Trěbonъ's village'), referring to an early inhabitant of the place.

== Church ==
The local parish church is dedicated to the Holy Cross. It was built in 1642 and extended in 1759 and belongs to the Roman Catholic Archdiocese of Maribor.
