= Libeliče =

- Village
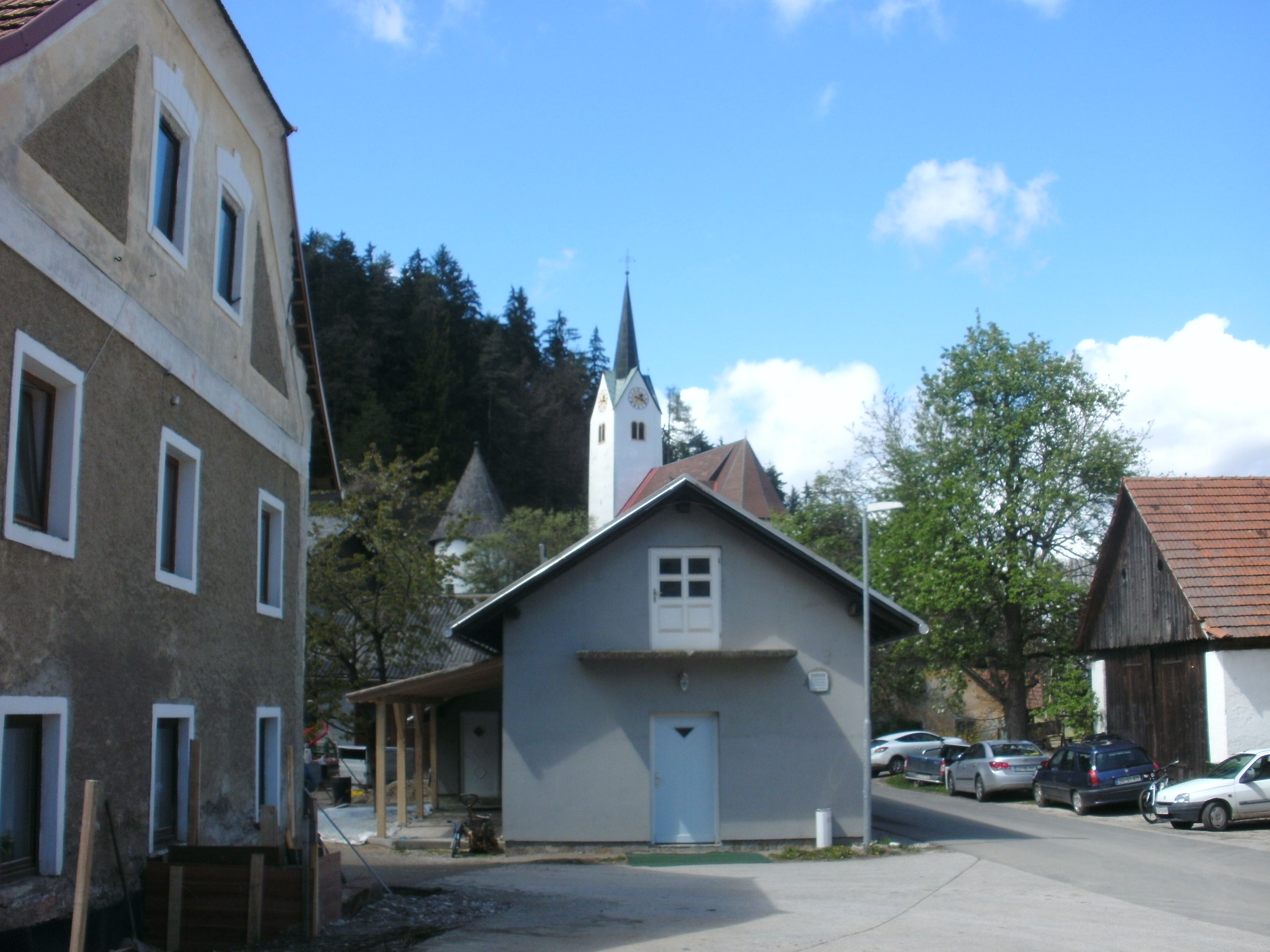
- Libeliče
- Interactive map of Libeliče
- Location in Slovenia Libeliče (Austria)
- Coordinates: 46°37′10.33″N 14°56′48.74″E
- Country: Slovenia
- Traditional region: Carinthia
- Statistical region: Carinthia
- Municipality: Dravograd

Area
  - Total: 0.54 km^{2} (0.21 sq mi)
- Elevation: 449.2 m (1,474 ft)

Population (2020)
  - Total: 201
  - Density: 370/km^{2} (960/sq mi)

Leifling
- Location in Austria
- Country: Austria
- State: Carinthia
- District: Völkermarkt
- Municipality: Neuhaus

Population (2024)
  - Total: 20

Libeliče (pronounced [libɛˈliːtʃɛ]; in older sources also Ljibeliče, German: Leifling) is a village in the Municipality of Dravograd in the Carinthia region in northern Slovenia, on the border with Austria. A small number of houses on the northern edge of the village, and Leifling Castle, are on the Austrian side of the border, in Neuhaus municipality in Austrian Carinthia.

The parish church in the settlement is dedicated to Saint Martin and belongs to the Roman Catholic Archdiocese of Maribor. It was first mentioned in written documents dating to 1106, but the current building was built in the second half of the 18th century. Next to the church is a 12th-century two-story ossuary.

== History ==
=== 1920 Carinthian plebiscite ===
Libeliče was in Zone A, an area of Carinthia subject to a 1920 plebiscite on whether to be part of Austria or Yugoslavia. The residents of Libeliče were pro-Yugoslav and helped organize pro-Yugoslav rallies prior to the plebiscite. On the day of the plebiscite, a large majority of the village voted for Yugoslavia; however Zone A as a whole voted voted for remaining in Austria, so Libeliče was to remain in Austria. The people of the village were unwilling to accept the outcome. After protests, the governments of Austria and Yugoslavia managed to agree on a territorial exchange: Austria ceded to Yugoslavia the territory of Libeliče and received in compensation an equally sized area with predominantly German-speaking settlements. The handover of the territories took place on October 1, 1922. This was the final demarcation between Austria and Yugoslavia (and its current legal successor Slovenia), still effective as of today.
