= Andrej Pečnik =

Slovenian footballer (born 1981)

Personal information
- Date of birth: 27 September 1981 (age 45)
- Place of birth: Dravograd, SFR Yugoslavia
- Height: 1.86 m (6 ft 1 in)
- Position: Defender

Team information
- Current team: Dravograd

Youth career
- Dravograd

Senior career*
Years	Team	Apps	(Gls)
2000–2001	Dravograd	24	(5)
2001–2004	Celje	25	(2)
2004–2006	Sigma Olomouc	21	(0)
2006–2007	Maribor	37	(1)
2008–2009	Politehnica Iaşi	46	(0)
2010–2011	Slovan Bratislava	3	(0)
2011–2013	Volgar	38	(1)
2013–2014	SAK Klagenfurt	24	(1)
2014–2017	FC Großklein	70	(2)
2017–2018	Dravograd	21	(1)
2025–	Dravograd		

International career
2005–2006	Slovenia	4	(0)
- * Club domestic league appearances and goals

Andrej Pečnik (born 27 September 1981) is a Slovenian footballer who plays as a defender for Dravograd.

== International career ==
Pečnik played four times for the Slovenia national team between 2005 and 2006.

== Personal life ==
He is the brother of Nejc Pečnik.

== Honours ==
Slovan Bratislava

- Corgoň liga: 2010–11
- Slovak Cup: 2010–11
