= Mislinja (river) =

River in Slovenia

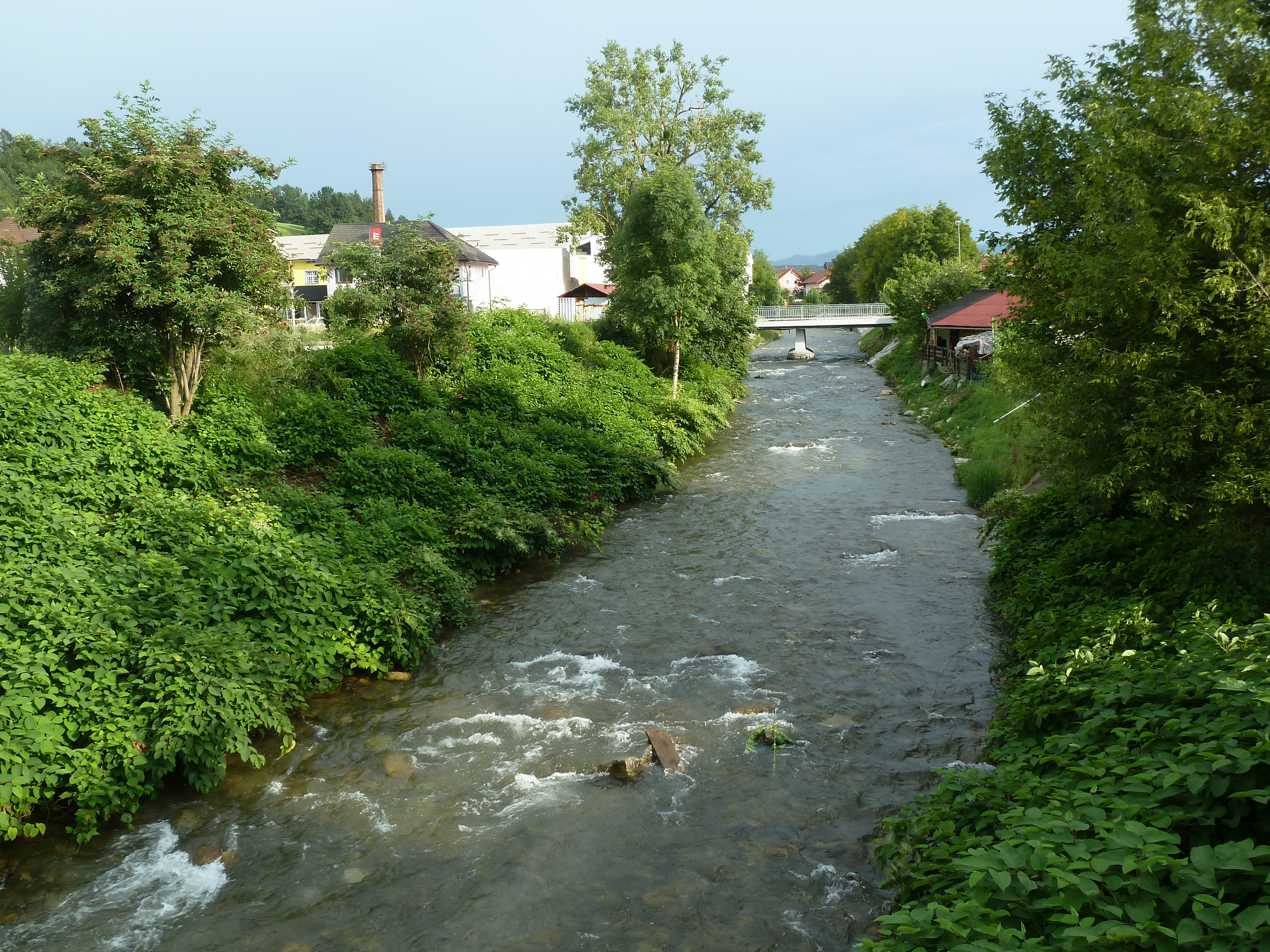
- The Mislinja in Slovenj Gradec

Location
- Country: Slovenia

Physical characteristics
- Mouth
  - location: Meža
  - coordinates: 46.5766°N 15.0252°E
- Length: 36 km (22 mi)
- Basin size: 238 km^{2} (92 sq mi)

Basin features
- Progression: Meža→ Drava→ Danube→ Black Sea

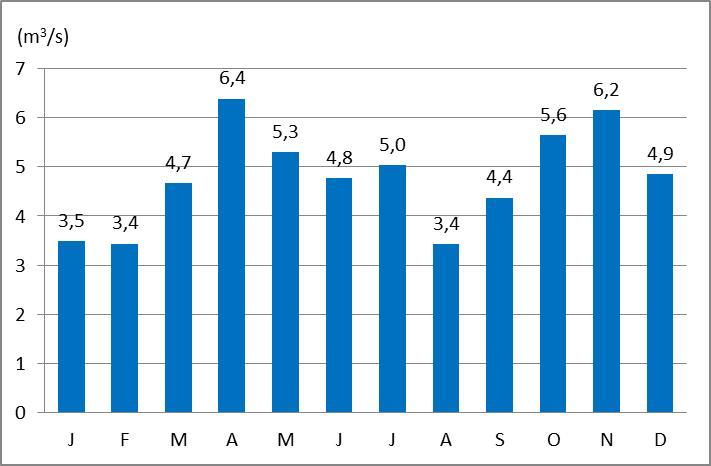
The average monthly discharge of the Mislinja at Otiški Vrh (1971–2000)

The Mislinja (pronounced [miˈsliːnja]) is a river in the northern part of Slovenia. It is 36 km (22 mi) long. It flows through Mislinja and Slovenj Gradec and empties from the right into the Meža River north of the village of Otiški Vrh near Dravograd, only a couple hundred meters before the Meža joins the Drava River.

== Name ==
The name Mislinja is derived from the phrase *Myslin'a (voda) (literally, 'Myslinъ's creek'), thus referring to a person or people living along the watercourse. The hypocorism *Myslinъ is derived from the personal name *Myslь. The town of Mislinja is named after the river.

== Description ==
Flowing from the crest of Pohorje across northern Carinthia to the Drava basin, the Mislinja is a vigorous upland stream—36 km long with a drainage area of 238 km^{2}—that exerts a disproportionately large geomorphic and hydrological influence for its modest size. It rises at around 1,150 m elevation in the boggy Šiklarica Saddle, where faults have opened the 10 km long Mislinja Graben (Slovene: Mislinjski graben)—an over-deepened trench that bisects the granodiorite dome of the central Pohorje Hills. From there the river cuts southwest through steep, densely forested ravines before swinging northwest into the wide Mislinja Valley, a glacio-fluvial trough floored with Late Quaternary sands and silty gravels. The valley floor carries the A169 road and the historic Mislinja railway formation, tying the settlement of Mislinja and the small city of Slovenj Gradec into a single ribbon of development. Downstream from Slovenj Gradec, the river incises once more, negotiating slate and gneiss ledges before debouching at 360 m elevation into the Meža just above its own confluence with the Drava at Dravograd. Ivan Gams notes that the gorge-and-valley alternation reflects successive phases of tectonic uplift, landslide damming, and headward capture along the active Labot Fault system; he calls the Mislinja Graben "the deepest longitudinal trench on Pohorje".

== Hydrology ==
Hydrologically, the Mislinja shows a classic snow-melt/autumn-rain regime: spring freshets driven by the Pohorje Hills thaw peak again in November, when Atlantic fronts sweep inland. Mean daily discharge at the Otiški Vrh gauge, 2 km above the mouth, hovers around 4 to 5 cubic metres per second (m³ s⁻¹) but can leap an order of magnitude during convective storms; the automatic station recorded 106 cm stage and 14 m³ s⁻¹ on 30 April 2025 after a 70 mm cloudburst. Water temperatures track the alpine rivers north of the Drava—4.4 °C in February 2025, roughly 0.8 °C above the 1991–2020 average—but rarely surpass 20 °C even in high summer, giving the channel a cold-water fish assemblage dominated by brown trout and grayling. Chemical and ecological status are officially good along both designated water bodies (upper headwaters and Slovenj Gradec–Otiški Vrh reaches), with mercury and brominated-ether exceedances absent and nutrient levels low. Forestry runoff, flash flood gravel pulses, and occasional log jams remain the chief management issues; nonetheless, the river's steep gradient, intact riparian forest, and visible tectonic imprint make it a textbook field stop for students examining the interplay of alpine uplift, bedrock structure, and high-energy fluvial processes in the southeastern Alps.
