= Berta Jereb =

Slovenian oncologist and radiotherapist

Berta Jereb (born 25 May 1925 in Črneče) is a Slovenian oncologist and the first Slovenian radiotherapist. She studied medicine in Vienna, Ljubljana, and Belgrade, and she received her bachelor's degree from the University of Ljubljana in 1950. In 1955, she specialised in radiotherapy and defended her master's thesis at the Karolinska Institute in Stockholm. In 1973, she went to the United States, where she worked at the Memorial Sloan–Kettering Cancer Center from 1973 to 1975 and from 1977 to 1984. For many years, she also worked at the Ljubljana Oncology Institute. Since 1993, she has been a full professor at the Faculty of Medicine of the University of Ljubljana. Her main work has centred on pediatric oncology, especially nephroblastoma. She was a founding member of the International Society of Paediatric Oncology (SIOP) and its president from 1976 to 1980.
