= Meža =

Meža Mieß
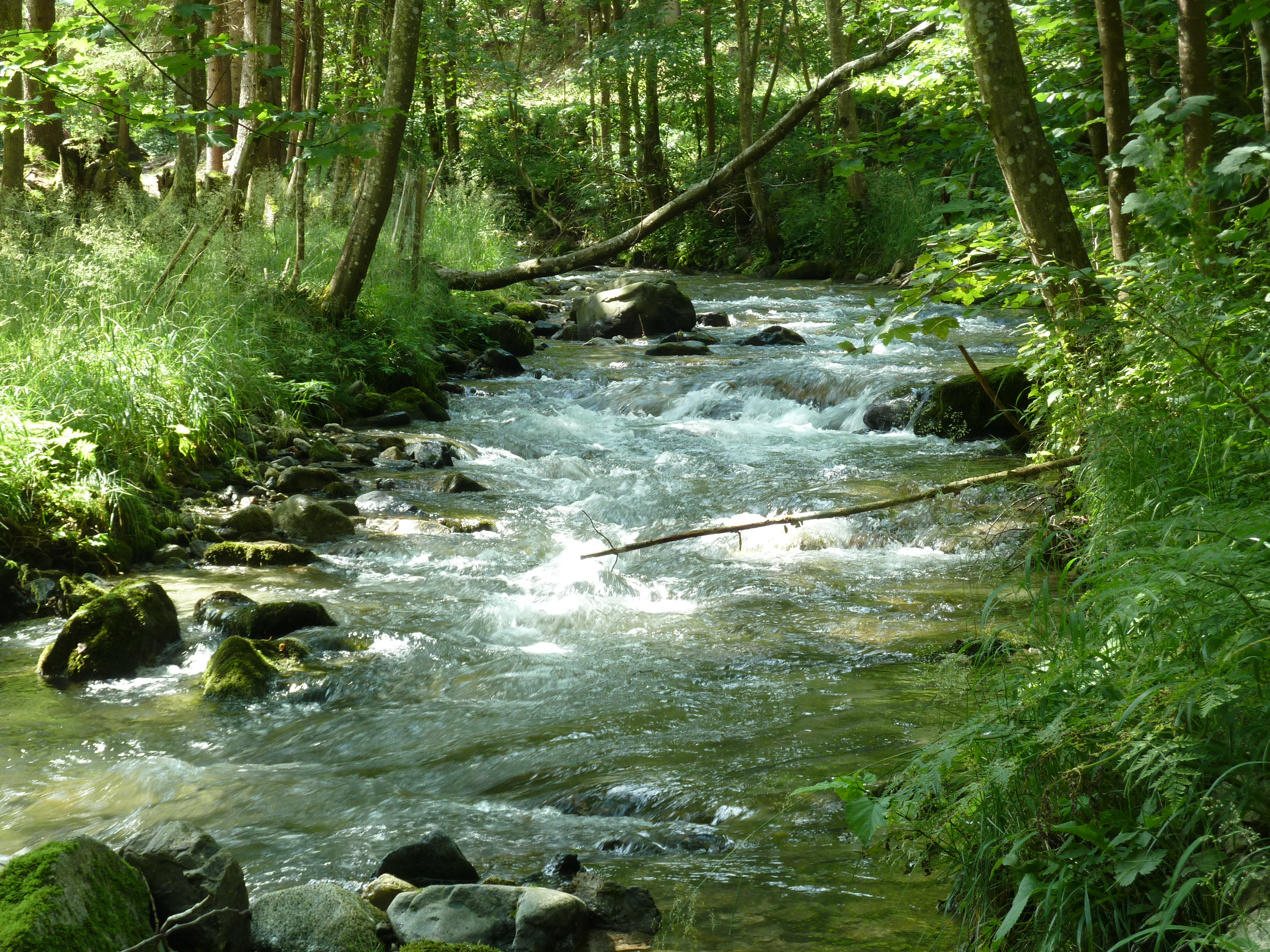
- Upper Meža near Črna

Location
- Countries: Austria and Slovenia
- Regions: Carinthia, Austria; Carinthia, Slovenia

Physical characteristics
- Source
  - location: Mt. Olševa near Eisenkappel
  - coordinates: 46°28′9″N 14°41′13″E
  - elevation: 1,358 m (4,455 ft)
- Mouth
  - location: Drava near Dravograd
  - coordinates: 46°35′11″N 15°1′20″E
- Length: 43 km (27 mi)
- Basin size: 551.7 km^{2} (213.0 sq mi)

Basin features
- Progression: Drava→ Danube→ Black Sea

The Meža (Slovene) or Mieß (German; pronounced [miːs]) is a river in the Austrian state of Carinthia and in Slovenia, a right tributary of the Drava. It is 43 kilometers (27 mi) long, of which 42 kilometers (26 mi) are in Slovenia. Its catchment area is 551.7 square kilometers (213.0 sq mi), of which 543 square kilometers (210 sq mi) in Slovenia.

== Name ==
The Meža River was attested as Mis in 1361, Mys in 1424, and Miß in 1476. The name is etymologically related to Czech Mže and the Russian river names Mzha and Mozha, derived from Slavic *mьz′a 'dripping, drizzling'.

== Course ==
It has its source on the Austrian side of the border north of Mount Olševa in the Karawanks range, becomes subterranean a kilometre from its source, and reappears on the surface in Koprivna west of Črna na Koroškem in Slovenia. From Črna the river turns northwards and flows between the slopes of the Peca massif and the St. Ursula Mountain to Mežica and Poljana. From here the river again flows eastwards to Prevalje, and Ravne na Koroškem, and into the Drava at Dravograd.

In its first part the Meža falls rapidly and is a typical Alpine river with its tributaries from the Kamnik Alps and the Karawanks mountain range. After Črna it becomes a slow meandering lowland river. Its main tributary is the Mislinja River, which joins the Meža River northwest of the village of Otiški Vrh near Dravograd, only a couple hundred meters before the Meža joins the Drava River.

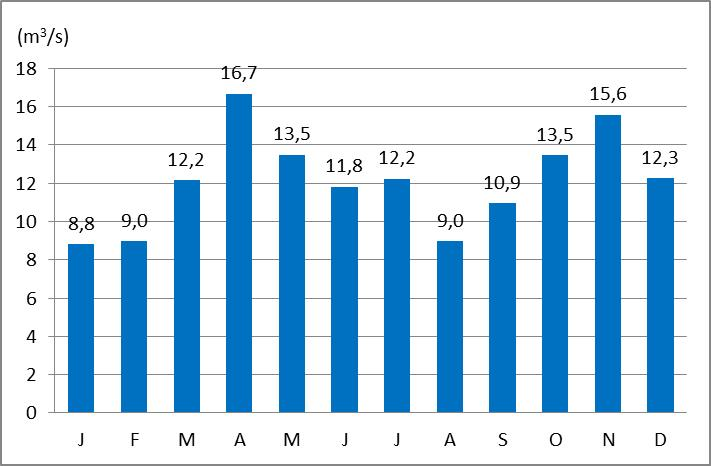
The average monthly discharge of the Meža at Otiški Vrh (1971–2000)

The Meža Valley (Mežiška dolina or Mießtal) within the southern Karawanks range was part of the Austrian Duchy of Carinthia up to 1919, before it was ceded to the Kingdom of Serbs, Croats and Slovenes according to the Treaty of Saint-Germain-en-Laye. Together with the adjacent Mislinja Valley and Upper Drava Valley, it has formed the traditional Carinthia (Koroška) region of independent Slovenia since 1991.

The Meža has been the most polluted river in Slovenia. In 1982 the singer-songwriter Marijan Smode wrote a song about it titled "Mrtva reka" (The Dead River). This song has even been published in primary school textbooks. The main polluter has been the Mežica lead mine and the Ravne Steelworks (Železarna Ravne) conglomerate.
