= Carinthia (Slovenia) =

Traditional region of Slovenia

Coordinates: 46°32′0″N 15°10′0″E

Carinthia (Slovenia) Koroška
- Traditional region
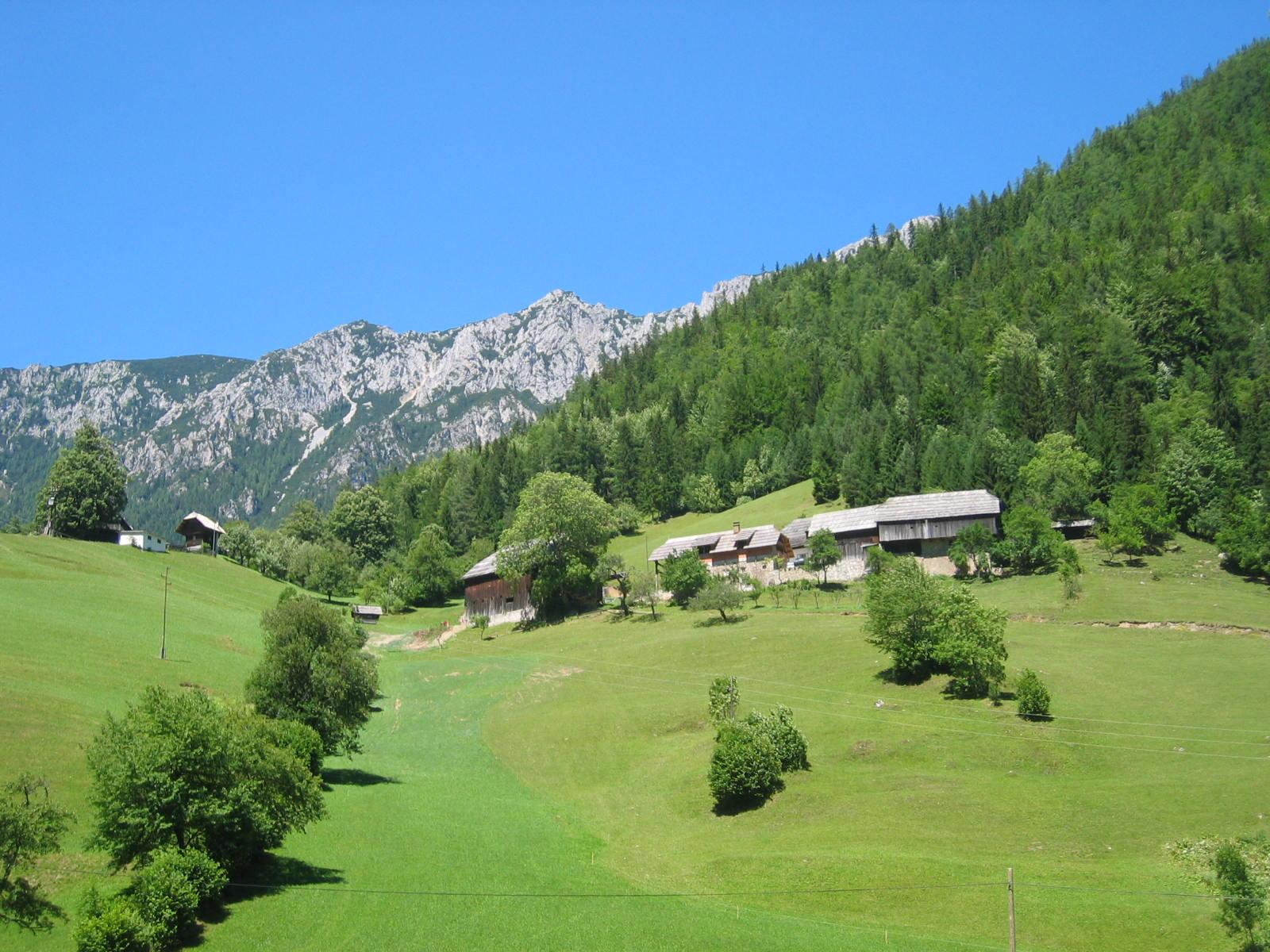
- Typical rural Carinthian landscape in Topla

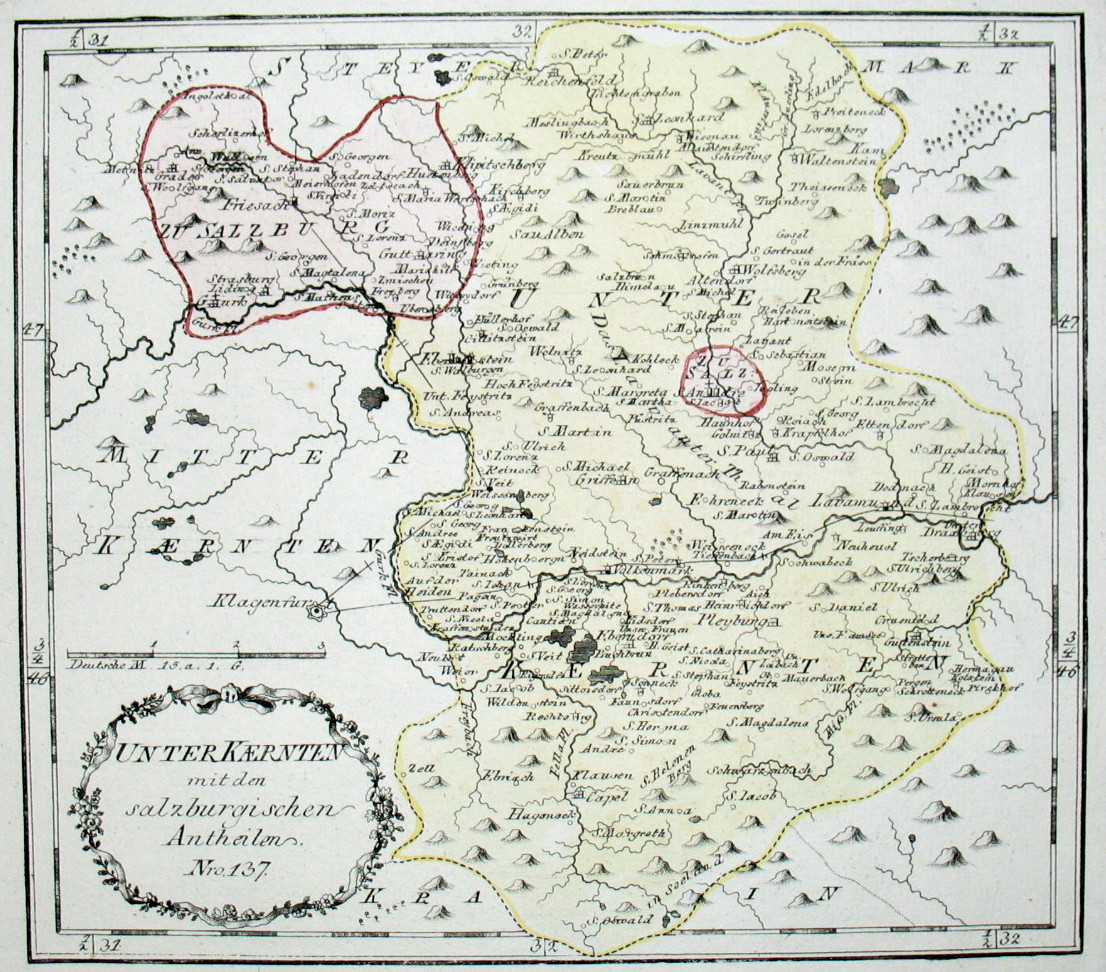
- 1791/92 map of Lower Carinthia
- Country: Slovenia
- Elevation: 400 m (1,300 ft)
- Demonym: Carinthian

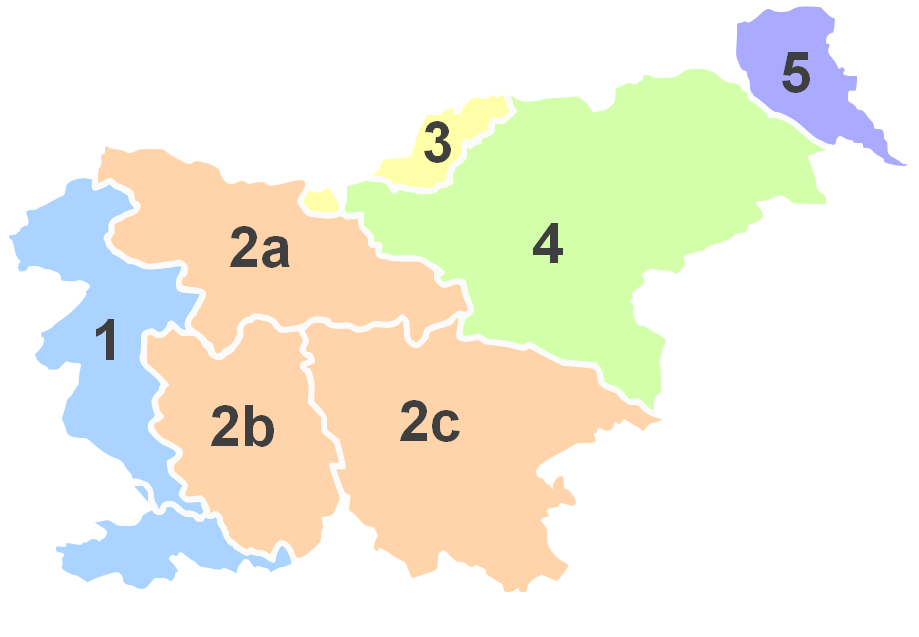
Traditional regions of Slovenia.: 1. Littoral; 2. Carniola: 2a Upper, 2b Inner, 2c Lower; 3. Carinthia; 4. Styria; 5. Prekmurje

Carinthia (Slovene: Koroška [kɔˈɾóːʃka]; German: Kärnten), also Slovene Carinthia or Slovenian Carinthia (Slovenska Koroška), (Note: In geographic sources, the terms Pohorje Drava Region (Pohorsko Podravje), Upper Drava Region (Zgornje Podravje), and Hilly Drava Region (Gorato Podravje) have been used as well. In popular sources, the most prominent has been the name Carinthian region (Koroška pokrajina), particularly from 1955 until 1994.) is a traditional region in northern Slovenia. (Note: The term Slovene Carinthia may also refer to the southern part of the Austrian State of Carinthia settled by Slovenes. In this case, the term Southeastern Carinthia has been used, encompassing Carinthia in Slovenia and the Jaun Valley (Slovene: Podjuna) in Austria.) The term refers to the small southeasternmost area of the former Duchy of Carinthia, which after World War I was allocated to the State of Slovenes, Croats and Serbs according to the 1919 Treaty of Saint-Germain. It has no distinct centre, but a local centre in each of the three central river valleys among the heavily forested mountains. Towns that make urban centers include Ravne, Prevalje, Mežica and Dravograd.

Since the entry of Slovenia into the European Union in May 2004, much effort has been made to re-integrate Carinthia as a cultural, tourism, and economic unit. The historical region has no official status within Slovenia and does not territorially correspond to today's Carinthia Statistical Region, but popular identification with Carinthia as an informal province remains common.

== Geography ==
The region lies in the Karawanks mountain range of the Southern Limestone Alps and comprises two spatially divided areas totalling 478 km^{2} (185 mi^{2}):

- the Meža Valley (Mežiška dolina) down to the confluence with the Drava Valley (Dravska dolina), including the municipalities of Črna na Koroškem, Mežica, Prevalje, Ravne na Koroškem, and Dravograd.
- the Municipality of Jezersko south of the Seeberg Saddle mountain pass.

All these municipalities border on the Austrian state of Carinthia in the north.

In 2005, the Carinthia Statistical Region was established, which covers a larger area of about 1,041 km^{2} (402 mi^{2}), parts of which encompass a number of adjacent municipalities belonging to the traditional region of Styria like the town of Slovenj Gradec in the Mislinja Valley or Muta and Radlje down the Drava River, though not Jezersko, which is part of the Upper Carniola Statistical Region.

The landscape of Carinthia is very diverse, with predominance of hilly and mountainous relief, in the Pleistocene transformed by glaciers. The climate is partially an alpine climate, and partially a transitional continental climate. An important element is temperature inversion. Over two thirds of Carinthia is covered by forest and the percentage is still increasing. The predominant tree species are beech, fir, and spruce. The lower areas have been polluted by lead due to a lead mine. Despite this, Carinthia is home to much game (hare, deer, roe deer) and alpine animal species above the timberline, like at Mount Peca or Mount Raduha. The Drava River is home to many fish.

== History ==
The name derives from the early medieval Slavic principality of Carantania, whose territory stretched from the present-day Austrian state of Carinthia down to the Styrian lands on the Sava river. The area was part of the Imperial Carinthian duchy established in 976 and ruled by the House of Habsburg from 1335, which in 1867 became a Cisleithanian crown land of Austria-Hungary. Upon the Austrian defeat in World War I, the newly established Kingdom of Serbs, Croats and Slovenes (later renamed Yugoslavia) in 1919 occupied southern Carinthia. The Meža Valley, the area around Dravograd and Jezersko, which are today the territory of Slovenia, were split off without a referendum, while in the occupied region north and west of this, on 10 October 1920 the voters in the Carinthian Plebiscite determined that those parts should become part of the newly founded First Austrian Republic.

During the 1941 Balkan Campaign of World War II, the area was annexed by Nazi Germany and put under the administration of the Reichsgau of Carinthia, led by Friedrich Rainer. Upon the German Instrument of Surrender in May 1945, Yugoslav Partisans entered the region, killing numerous alleged collaborators during the Bleiburg repatriations. The area around Dravograd (Otiški Vrh, Selovec, Bukovska Vas, Šentjanž) and Prevalje (Leše, Poljana) is the site of several mass graves. After the war, the region formed part of the Yugoslav Socialist Republic of Slovenia, it became part of independent Slovenia after the breakup of Yugoslavia in 1991.

== Demographics ==
Carinthia has uneven settlement and a relatively young population. Nonetheless, due to a low birth rate and shorter life span, the number of inhabitants is decreasing. The biggest employer is the processing industry. Many people are commuters, working in Ljubljana, Maribor, Velenje and Austria. In 2008, there was relatively high unemployment, 10.5% in the mining town of Črna na Koroškem and 11.8% in Ravne na Koroškem, known for its steel industry. Other large settlements are the mining towns of Mežica and Prevalje, and Dravograd along the Maribor-Klagenfurt railway.

== Economy ==
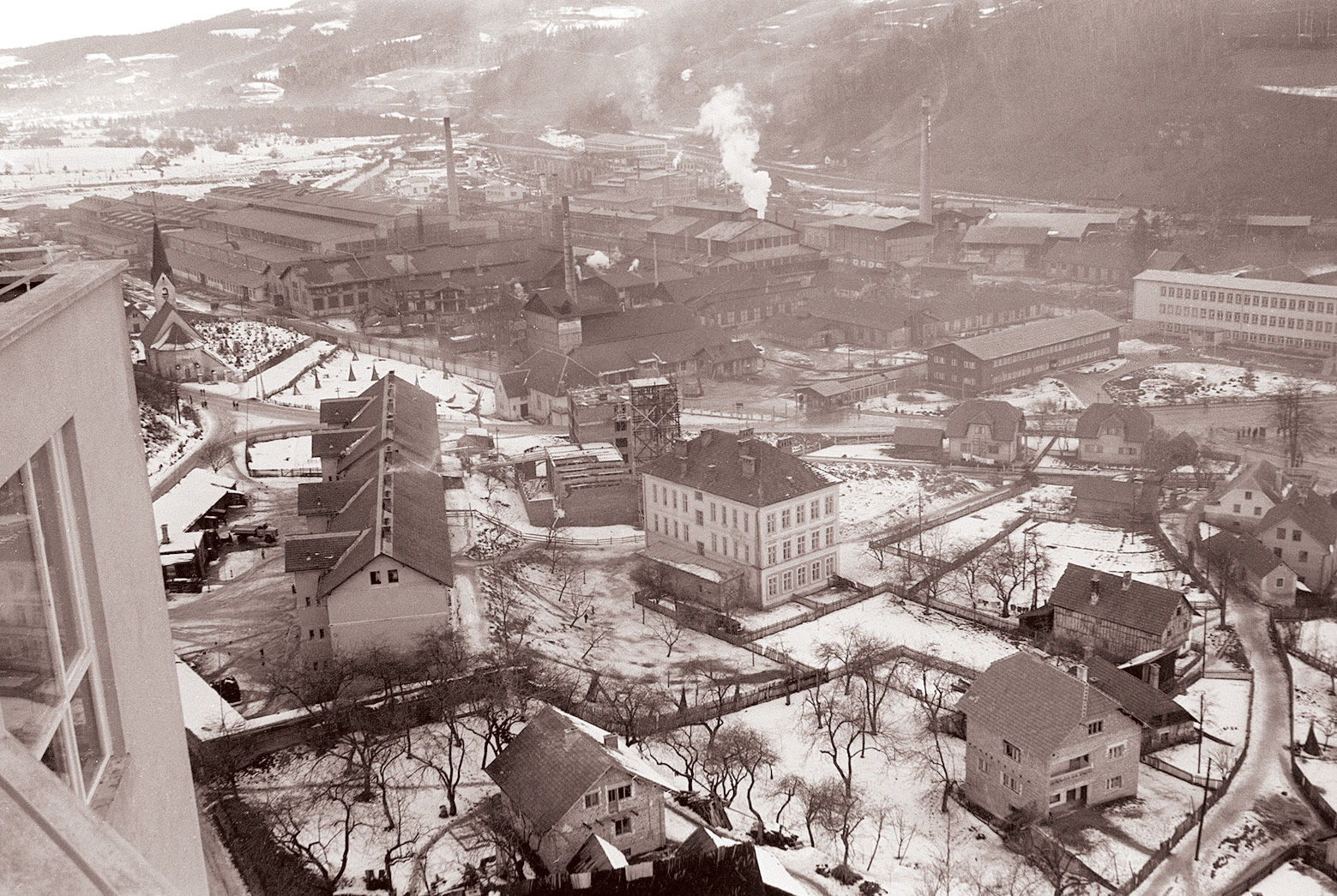
Ravne steelworks, 1960

In the 1990s, the lead and zinc mine in the Meža Valley, the most highly industrialized valley of the region, and the lead smelter in Žerjav were closed down. The only factory in the area around the mine still operating is TAB, a manufacturer of batteries. Metal Ravne, the steel mill at Ravne, which was one of the largest employers in the Duchy of Carinthia in the 19th century, managed to survive and now specializes in alloy steel and machinery components. There are five hydroelectric plants in the Carinthian stretch of the Drava Valley, with a total capacity of about 60 megawatts, and metal products are produced in different places.

== Environment ==
After the shut-down of the zinc mine, the extremely poor environmental situation in the narrow Meža Valley with its centuries-long lead and zinc ore exploitation has slowly been improving. However, the entire area of the Slovene Carinthia continues to suffer from severe damage to its forests. In some areas, up to 40% of the trees are damaged due to heavy sulfur dioxide emissions from the Šoštanj Power Plant and the iron works in Ravne.

Despite the pollution of the Meža and Drava rivers, water supply has never been a problem. Clean water is abundant due to the mountainous terrain with its impermeable rock. Almost every farm in the mountains has its own water supply system, and the settlements in the valleys are connected to municipal water supply systems.

== Education and culture ==
The Dr. Franc Sušnik Central Carinthian Library and the Carinthian museum are in Ravne na Koroškem, but the Carinthian Regional Museum, the Carinthian Gallery of Fine Arts, and the regional radio station are located in Slovenj Gradec (historically part of Styria). In the past, educational establishments and other activities were dispersed among several small towns. There are high schools in Ravne and Muta. Students who wish to continue their tertiary education mostly choose the universities in Maribor and Ljubljana. In Črna na Koroškem, there is a centre for the protection and vocational education of physically and mentally handicapped youth.

== Notable people ==
- Aleš Gorza, skier
- Robert Koren, football player
- Lado Kralj, writer, theatre critic and literary historian
- Alojzij Kuhar, historian, diplomat, journalist and politician
- Mitja Kunc, skier
- Nataša Lačen, cross country skier
- Tina Maze, skier
- Boštjan Nachbar, basketball player
- Vinko Ošlak, essayist, translator, and Christian thinker
- Andrej Pečnik, football player
- Nejc Pečnik, football player
- Danilo Pudgar, skier
- Renata Salecl, philosopher
- Mirnes Šišić, football player
- Adi Smolar, singer-songwriter
- Katarina Srebotnik, tennis player
- Marko Šuler, football player
- Tine Urnaut, volleyball player
- Prežihov Voranc, writer
- Hugo Wolf, composer
- Franc Šegovc, composer, songwriter
