= Drava =

Tributary of the Danube River in south-central Europe

Drava or Drave Drau, Dráva
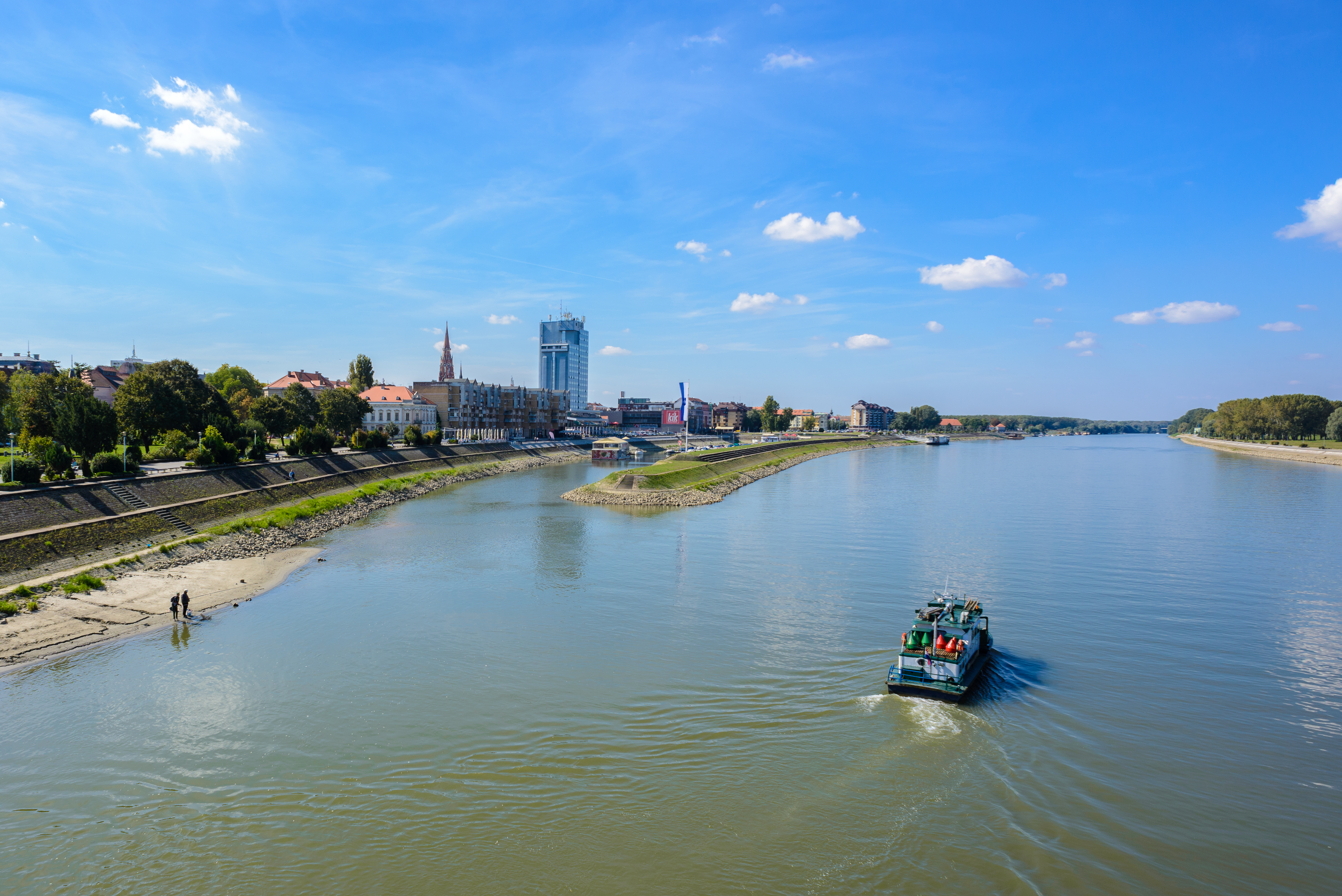
- The Drava in Osijek, Croatia

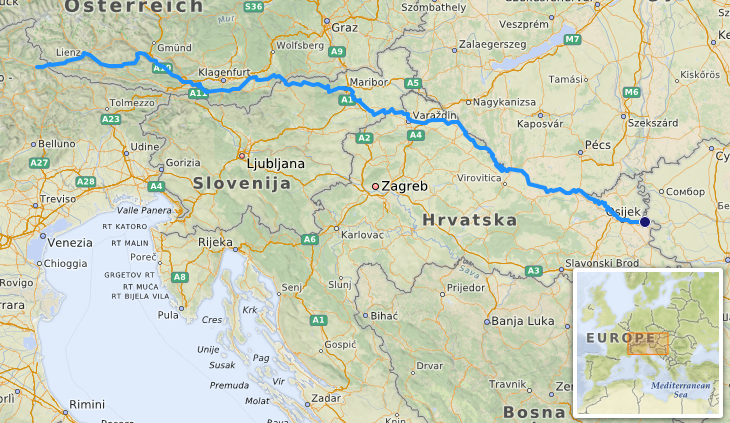
- Map of the Drava

Location
- Countries: Italy; Austria; Slovenia; Croatia; Hungary
- Cities: Lienz; Spittal an der Drau; Villach; Ferlach; Dravograd; Vuzenica; Muta; Ruše; Maribor; Ptuj; Ormož; Varaždin; Barcs; Belišće; Osijek

Physical characteristics
- Source: North of the Neunerkofel/Cima Nove over the Toblacher Feld/Sella di Dobbiaco
  - location: Toblach/Dobbiaco, South Tyrol/Alto Adige, Italy
  - coordinates: 46°43′9″N 12°15′16″E
  - elevation: 1,450 m (4,760 ft)
- Mouth: Danube near Osijek
  - location: Croatia
  - coordinates: 45°32′38″N 18°55′31″E
- Length: 709.8 km (441.0 mi)
- Basin size: 40,154 km^{2} (15,504 mi^{2})
- Discharge
  - location: Osijek, Croatia (19.8 km; 12¼ miles upstream of mouth)
  - average: 552 m^{3}/s (19,500 cu ft/s)
  - minimum: 125 m^{3}/s (4,400 cu ft/s)
  - maximum: 3,000 m^{3}/s (110,000 cu ft/s)
- Discharge
  - location: Belišće, Croatia (53.8 km; 33½ miles upstream of mouth - Basin size: 38,500 km^{2} (14,900 sq mi)
  - average: 544 m^{3}/s (19,200 cu ft/s)
  - minimum: 160 m^{3}/s (5,700 cu ft/s)
  - maximum: 2,232 m^{3}/s (78,800 cu ft/s)
- Discharge
  - location: Barcs, Hungary (154.1 km; 95¾ miles upstream of mouth - Basin size: 33,977 km^{2} (13,119 sq mi)
  - average: 486 m^{3}/s (17,200 cu ft/s) (Period of data: 1896–2014)595 m^{3}/s (21,000 cu ft/s)
  - minimum: 114 m^{3}/s (4,000 cu ft/s) (Period of data: 1896–2014)170 m^{3}/s (6,000 cu ft/s)
  - maximum: 3,040 m^{3}/s (107,000 cu ft/s) (Period of data: 1896–2014)3,070 m^{3}/s (108,000 cu ft/s)
- Discharge
  - location: Ormož, Slovenia (312.8 km; 194¼ miles upstream of mouth - Basin size: 15,379 km^{2} (5,938 sq mi)
  - average: 292 m^{3}/s (10,300 cu ft/s)
  - minimum: 28 m^{3}/s (990 cu ft/s)
  - maximum: 1,994 m^{3}/s (70,400 cu ft/s)
- Discharge
  - location: Lavamünd, Austria (413.3 km; 256¾ miles upstream of mouth - Basin size: 11,052 km^{2} (4,267 sq mi)
  - average: 280 m^{3}/s (9,900 cu ft/s)
  - minimum: 95 m^{3}/s (3,400 cu ft/s)
  - maximum: 2,400 m^{3}/s (85,000 cu ft/s)

Basin features
- Progression: Danube→ Black Sea
- River system: Danube River

The Drava or Drave (German: Drau, pronounced [ˈdʁaʊ]; Slovene: Drava [ˈdɾàːʋa]; Croatian: Drava [drǎːʋa]; Hungarian: Dráva [ˈdraːvɒ]; Italian: Drava [ˈdraːva]), historically known as the Dravis or Dravus, is a river in southern Central Europe. With a length of 710km (441 miles), or 724km (450 miles), if the length of its Sextner Bach source is added, it is the fifth or sixth longest tributary of the Danube, after the Tisza, Sava, Prut, Mureș and likely Siret. The Drava drains an area of about 40,154 square kilometers (15,504 sq. mi.). Its mean annual discharge is seasonally 500m³ (650 cu. yd.) per second to 670m³ (880 cu. yd.) per second. Its source is near the market town of Innichen, in the Puster Valley of South Tyrol, Italy. The river flows eastward through East Tyrol and Carinthia in Austria into the Styria region of Slovenia. It then turns southeast, passing through northern Croatia and, after merging with its main tributary the Mur, forms most of the border between Croatia and Hungary, before it joins the Danube near Osijek, in Croatia.

== Name ==
In ancient times the river was known as Dravus or Draus in Latin, and in Greek as Δράος and Δράβος. Medieval attestations of the name include Dravis (c. AD 670), Drauva (in 799), Drauus (in 811), Trauum (in 1091), and Trah (in 1136). The name is pre-Roman and pre-Celtic, but probably of Indo-European origin, from the root *dreu̯- 'flow'. The river gives its name to the dravite species of tourmaline.

=== Carpis ===
The Carpis (Greek: Κάρπίς) was a river which, according to Herodotus, flowed from the upper country of the Ombricans northward into the Ister (Danube), whence it has been supposed that this river is the same as the Dravus.

== Geography ==
The Drava (along with one of its tributaries, the Slizza) and the Spöl are the only two rivers originating in Italy that belong to the Danube drainage basin. Its main left tributaries (from the north) are the Isel (contributes 39 m^{3}/s), the Möll (25 m^{3}/s), the Lieser (22 m^{3}/s), the Gurk (30 m^{3}/s) and the Lavant (12 m^{3}/s) in Austria, and the Mur (166 m^{3}/s) near Legrad at the Croatian–Hungarian border. Its main right tributaries (from the south) are the Gail (45 m^{3}/s) in Austria, the Meža (12 m^{3}/s) and Dravinja (11 m^{3}/s) in Slovenia, and the Bednja (? m^{3}/s) in Croatia.

Country	Length (km)	Catchment area (km^{2})	Mean flow (m^{3}/s)
Italy	10.6	354 (0.9%)	4
Austria	254.7	22162 (55.2%)	280
Austria–Slovenia	4.2	border	
Slovenia	117.7	4662 (11.6%)	292
Slovenia–Croatia	23.3	border	
Croatia	166.4	6822 (17.0%)	544
Croatia–Hungary	133.0	border	
Hungary	0	6154 (15.3%)	544
Total	709.8	40154 (100%)	544

Mean discharge is for the last station in the country mentioned in the source.

== Course ==
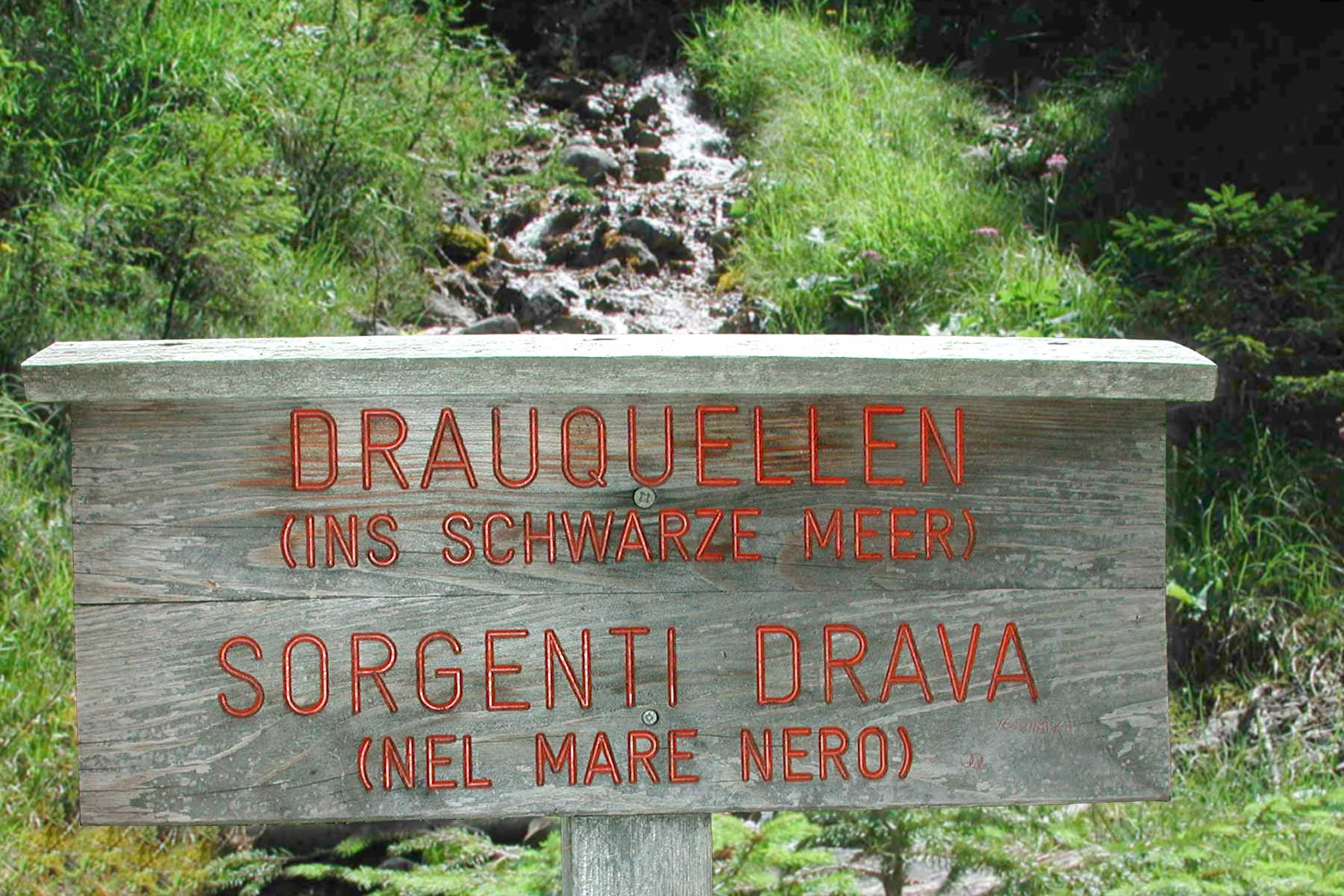
Drava sources, Innichen

The sources of the Drava are located at the drainage divide between the market town of Innichen/San Candido and neighbouring Toblach/Dobbiaco in the west, where the Rienz River rises, a tributary of the Adige/Etsch. At Innichen itself the 16+ km (10 mile) Sextner Bach, originating near the Sextener Rotwand, joins the ~2 km (1¼ mile) long source creek. The river then flows eastwards and after 8 kilometres (5 miles) crosses into East Tyrol in Austria. At Lienz it flows into the Isel, sourced from the glaciers of the Venediger and Glockner Groups. The Isel (average discharge 39 m^{3}/s) is almost three times larger than the Drava (14 m^{3}/s) where they meet and, starting from the source of its tributary Schwarzach under the Rötspitze, the Isel (ca. 64 km; 40 miles) is also longer than the combined Drava and Sextner Bach (ca. 60 km; 35 miles) to that point.

The river then flows east into Carinthia at Oberdrauburg. The river separates the Kreuzeck range of the High Tauern in the north and the Gailtal Alps in the south, passes the Sachsenburg narrows and the site of the ancient city of Teurnia, before it reaches the town of Spittal an der Drau. Downstream of Villach, it runs along the northern slopes of the Karawanks to Ferlach and Lavamünd.

The Drava passes into Slovenia at Gorče near Dravograd, from where it runs for 142 kilometres (88 mi) via Vuzenica, Muta, Ruše, and Maribor to Ptuj and the border with Croatia at Ormož.

The river then passes north of Varaždin, after which it receives the Plitvica and Bednja from the right, and then Mura at the border with Hungary. It continues as a largely border river towards the southeast, receiving Gliboki and Bistra Koprivnička from the right. It passes the city of Barcs in Hungary from the south. It starts to be navigable, for about 90 kilometres (56 mi) in Croatia, from the confluence of the Čađavica to its mouth. It passes Belišće from the north, receives the Karašica from the right, and then passes the city of Osijek from the north. Afterwards, it enters the Kopački Rit wetland and merges into the Danube from its right.

The hydrological parameters of Drava are regularly monitored in Croatia at Botovo, Terezino Polje, Donji Miholjac and Osijek.

== Discharge ==
The Drava's mean annual discharge (Q – m³/s) at Drávaszabolcs (Hungary, 77.7 rkm). Period from 1995 to 2025.

Year	Q	Year	Q
1995	479	2011	442.4
1996	598	2012	528.3
1997	437	2013	638.5
1998	513	2014	714.9
1999	588	2015	459.2
2000	549	2016	269.7
2001	464	2017	359.7
2002	410.6	2018	446.4
2003	348.8	2019	259.8
2004	501.6	2020	535.5
2005	474.1	2021	478.4
2006	326.7	2022	319.1
2007	338	2023	636
2008	483.5	2024	628.2
2009	627.9	2025	369.8
2010	633.4	2026	

== Hydroelectric power plants ==
Currently, there are 22 hydroelectric power plants on the Drava. The power plants are listed beginning at the headwaters:

Dam	Nameplate capacity (MW)	Annual generation (Mio. kwh)
Amlach power station	60	219
Paternion	24	95
Kellerberg	25	96
Villach	25	100
Rosegg-St. Jakob	80	338
Feistritz-Ludmannsdorf	88	354
Ferlach-Maria Rain	75	318
Annabrücke	90	390
Edling	87	407
Schwabeck	79	378
Lavamünd	28	156
Dravograd	26.2	142
Vuzenica	55.6	247
Vuhred	72.3	297
Ožbalt	73.2	305
Fala	58	260
Mariborski Otok	60	270
Zlatoličje	126	577
Formin	116	548
Varaždin	86	476
Čakovec	75.9	400
Dubrava	84	

The Drava is one of the most exploited rivers in the world in terms of hydropower, with almost 100% of its water potential energy being exploited. As the region of the river is a place of exceptional biodiversity, this raises several ecological concerns, together with other forms of exploitation such as use of river deposits.

== Bibliography ==
- Petrić, Hrvoje (2014). "About Drava River Floodings. Some Aspects of the Interrelationship between Humans and the River Drava in the Pre-Industrial Times with an Emphasis on the Late 18th and Early 19th Century.". Man, Nature and Environment Between the Northern Adriatic and the Eastern Alps in Premodern Times. University of Ljubljana. ISBN 978-961-237723-6.
