= History of Slovenia =

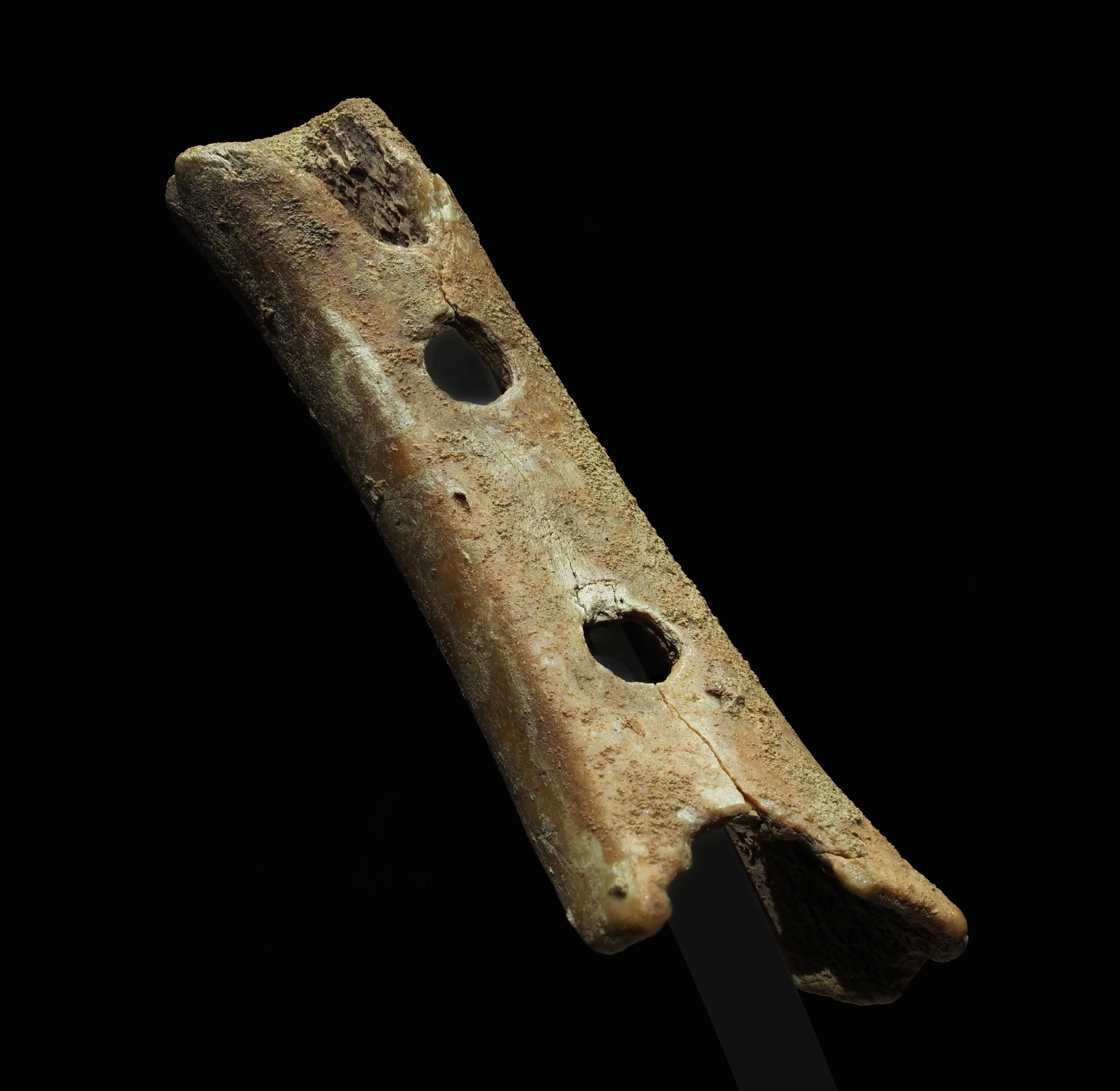
A pierced cave bear bone, possibly a flute made by Neanderthals dating to the Late Pleistocene

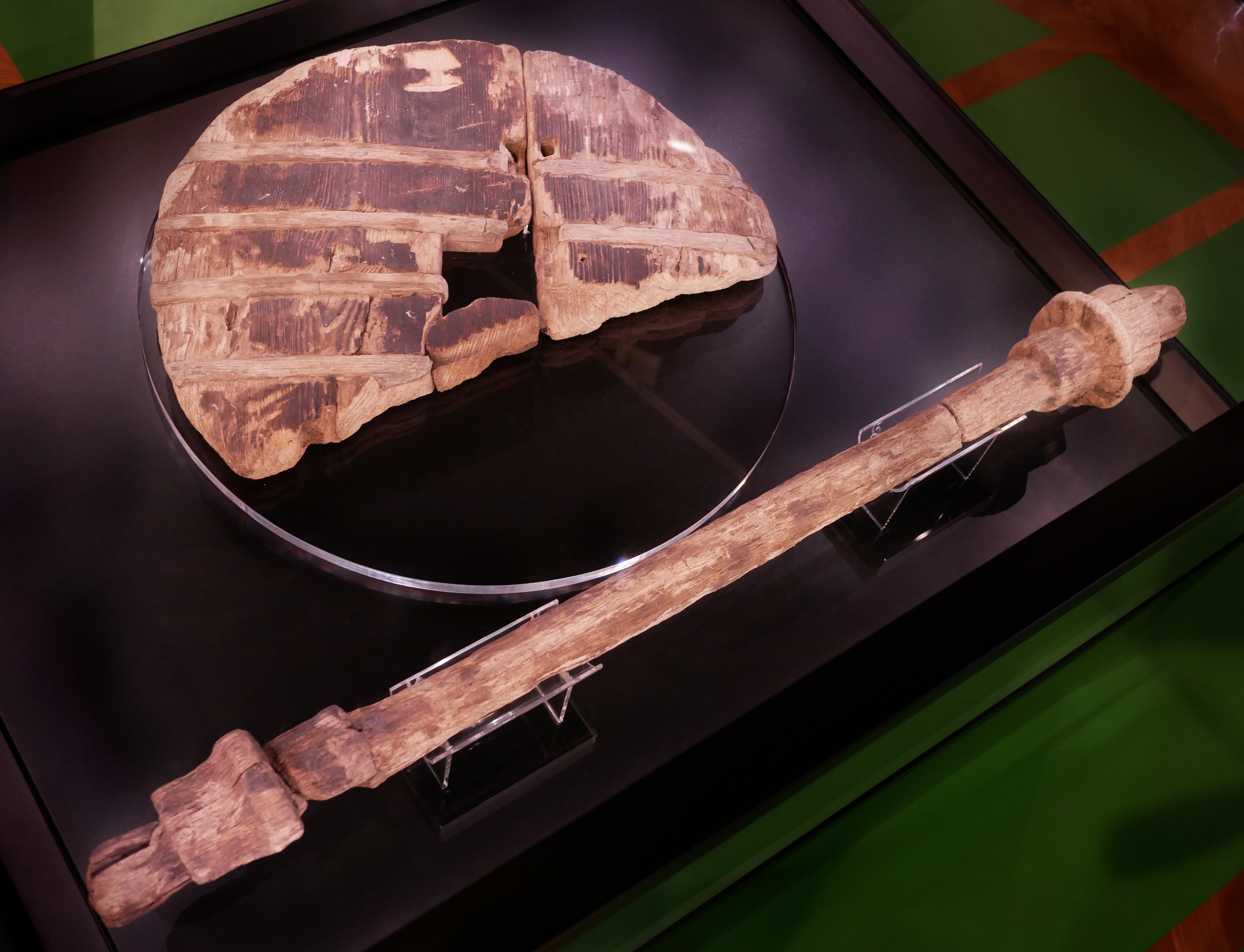
The Ljubljana Marshes Wheel, dating to the Neolithic period, is the oldest wooden wheel yet discovered.

The history of Slovenia chronicles the period of the Slovenian territory from the 5th century BC to the present. In the Early Bronze Age, Proto-Illyrian tribes settled an area stretching from present-day Albania to the city of Trieste. The Slovenian territory was part of the Roman Empire, and it was devastated by the Migration Period's incursions during late Antiquity and the Early Middle Ages. The main route from the Pannonian plain to Italy ran through present-day Slovenia. Alpine Slavs, ancestors of modern-day Slovenians, settled the area in the late 6th Century AD. The Holy Roman Empire controlled the land for nearly 1,000 years. Between the mid-14th century through 1918 most of Slovenia was under Habsburg rule. In 1918, most Slovene territory became part of the Kingdom of Serbs, Croats, and Slovenes, and in 1929 the Drava Banovina was created within the Kingdom of Yugoslavia with its capital in Ljubljana, corresponding to Slovenian-majority territories within the state. The Socialist Republic of Slovenia was created in 1945 as part of federal Yugoslavia. Slovenia gained its independence from Yugoslavia in June 1991, and today it is a member of the European Union and NATO.

== Prehistory to Slavic settlement ==
=== Prehistory ===
The area later known as Slovenia has been inhabited since prehistoric times. There is evidence of human habitation from ~250,000 years ago.

The best-known Neanderthal archaeological site in Slovenia is a cave close to the village of Šebrelje near Cerkno, known as Divje Babe. Here the Divje Babe flute was found in 1995, a perforated bone controversially believed to be a flute. It is believed to date from 41000 ± 700 BC. It is possibly the world's oldest known musical instrument.

In 2002, remains of pile dwellings over 4,500 years old were discovered in the Ljubljana Marsh, later protected as a UNESCO World Heritage Site, along with the Ljubljana Marshes Wooden Wheel, the oldest wooden wheel in the world. It indicates that wooden wheels appeared almost simultaneously in Mesopotamia and Europe. In the 1920s and 1930s, Cro-Magnon artifacts such as pierced bones, bone points, and a needle were found n Potok Cave.

In the transition period between the Bronze Age to the Iron Age, the Urnfield culture flourished. Archaeological remains dating from the Hallstatt period were found particularly in southeastern Slovenia, with important settlements in Most na Soči, Vače, and Šentvid pri Stični, including situlas in Novo Mesto, the "Town of Situlas".

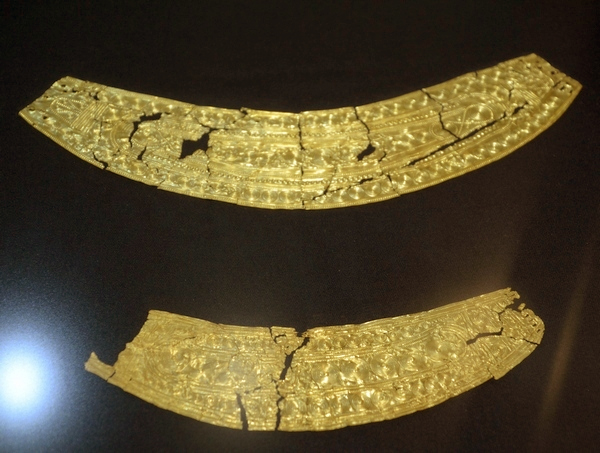
Gold appliqués, Urnfield culture, c. 1200 BC.

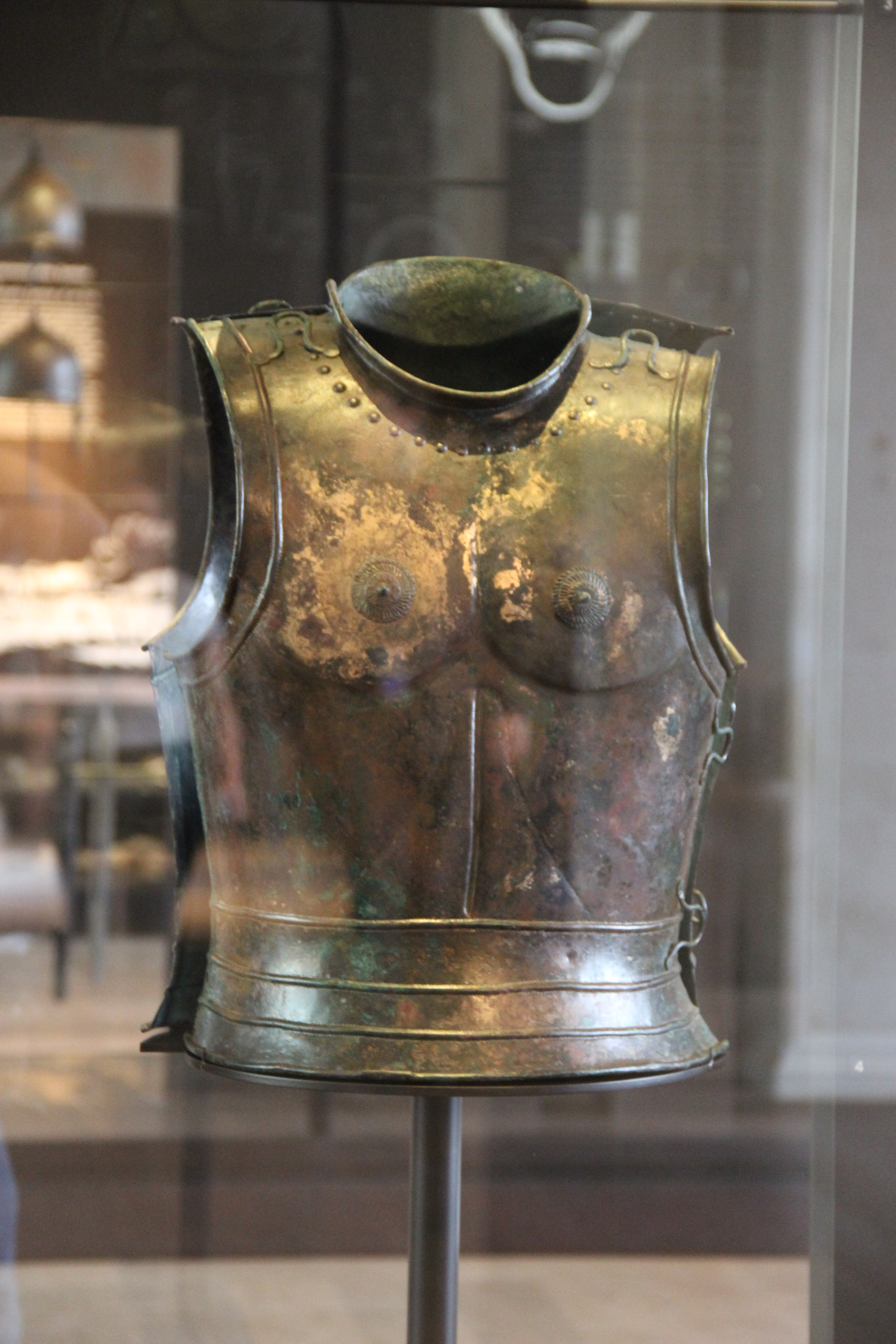
Bronze breastplate, Hallstatt culture, 600 BC

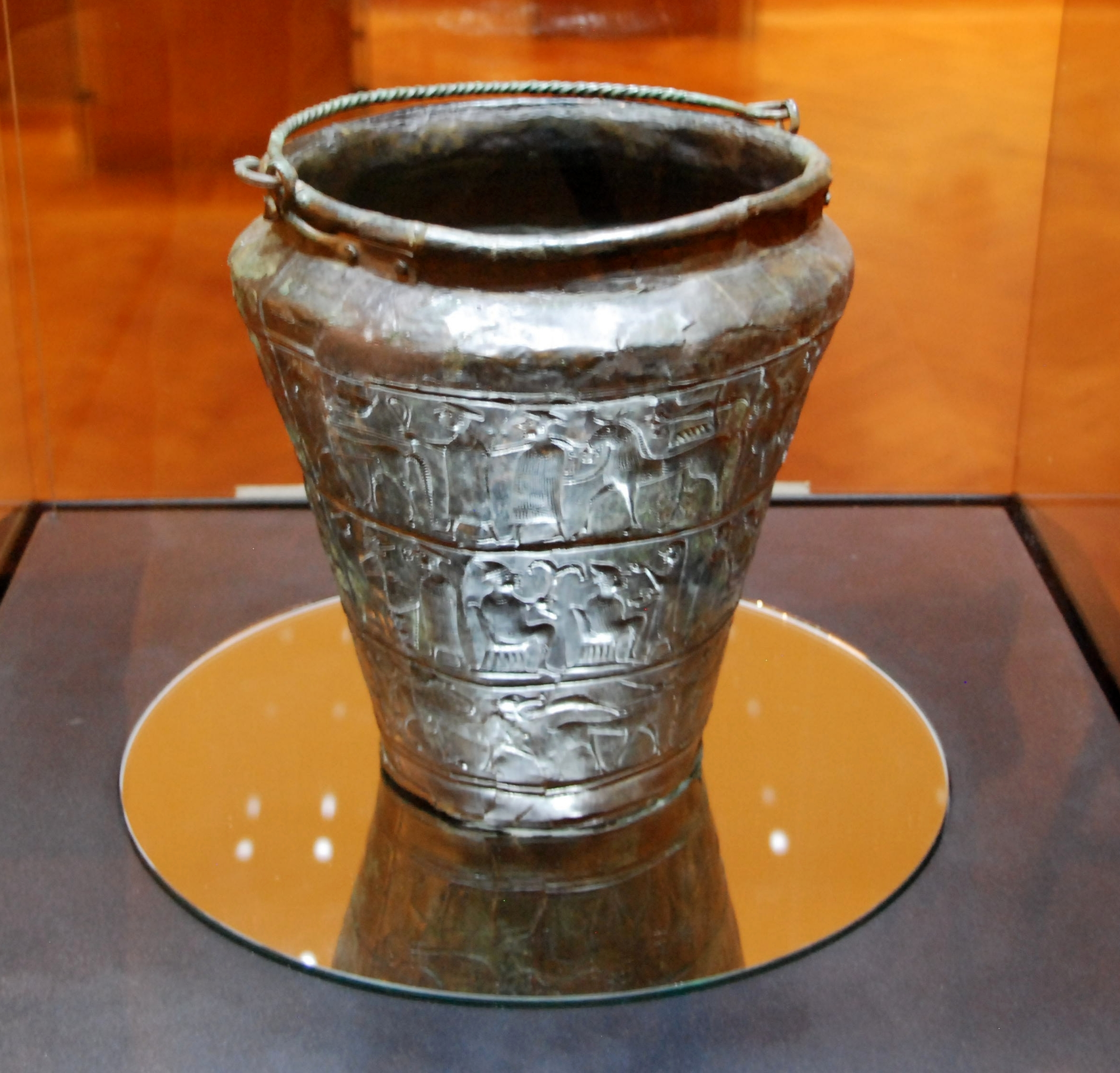
Vače Situla, Hallstatt culture, 5th century BC

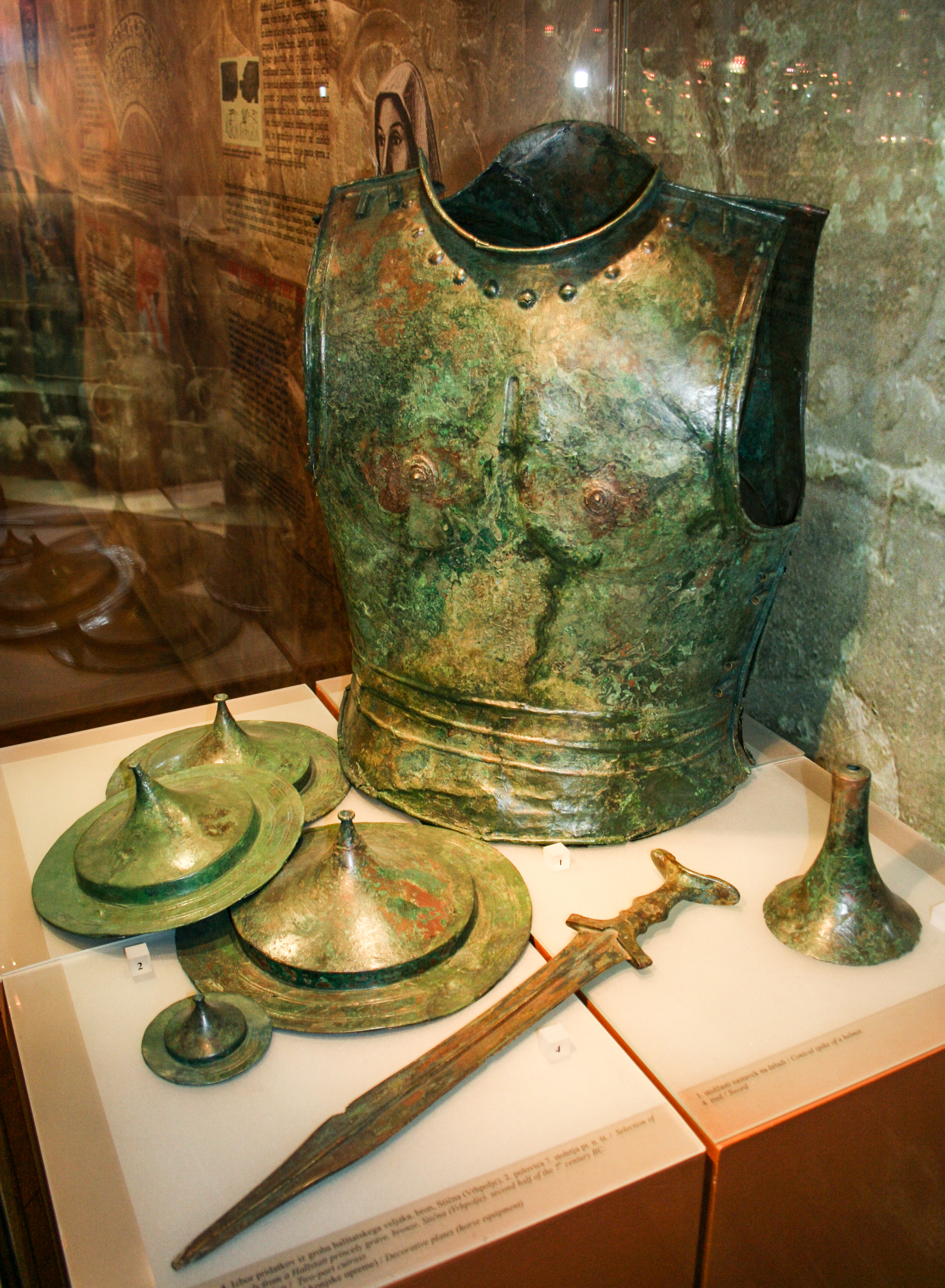
Princely warrior equipment, Hallstatt culture

=== Ancient Celts and Romans ===
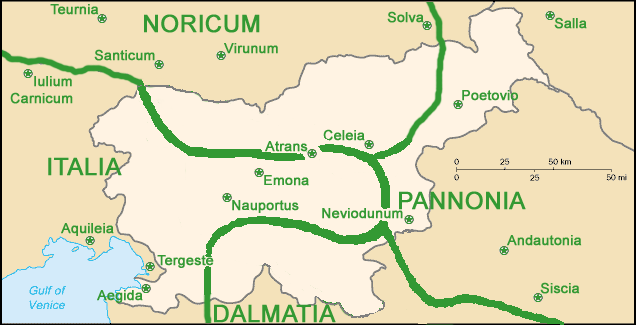
Map of Slovenia with ancient Roman provinces and cities (as of 100 A.D.) in green and present-day frontiers in grey

In the Iron Age, present-day Slovenia was inhabited by Illyrian and Celtic tribes until the 1st century BC, when the Romans conquered the region

During Roman times, the area was divided between Venetia et Histria (region X of Roman Italia in the classification of Augustus) and the imperial provinces Pannonia and Noricum. The Romans established strategic urban posts at Emona (Ljubljana), Poetovio (Ptuj), and Celeia (Celje); and constructed trade and military roads to connect Italy with Pannonia. Important Roman towns there included Emona, Celeia and Poetovio. Other important settlements were Nauportus, Neviodunum, Haliaetum, Atrans, and Stridon.

In 394, the historic Battle of the Frigidus took place in the Vipava Valley, where Eastern Emperor Theodosius I defeated German usurper Eugenius. As the western empire weakened through the 5th and 6th centuries, the area was subject to invasions by the Huns and Germanic tribes during their incursions into Italy. To protect the Italian heartland the Romans built the Claustra Alpium Iuliarum (defensive line of towers and walls).

During the Migration Period (4th-9th century), the region suffered many barbarian invasions, due to its strategic position as the main passage from the Pannonian Plain to the Italian Peninsula. Rome abandoned the region at the end of the 4th century. Most cities were destroyed, while the remaining local population moved to the highland areas, establishing fortified towns. In the 5th century, the region was part of the Ostrogothic Kingdom, and was later contested between the Ostrogoths, the Byzantine Empire and the Lombards.

=== Slavic settlement ===
==== Slavic settlement ====
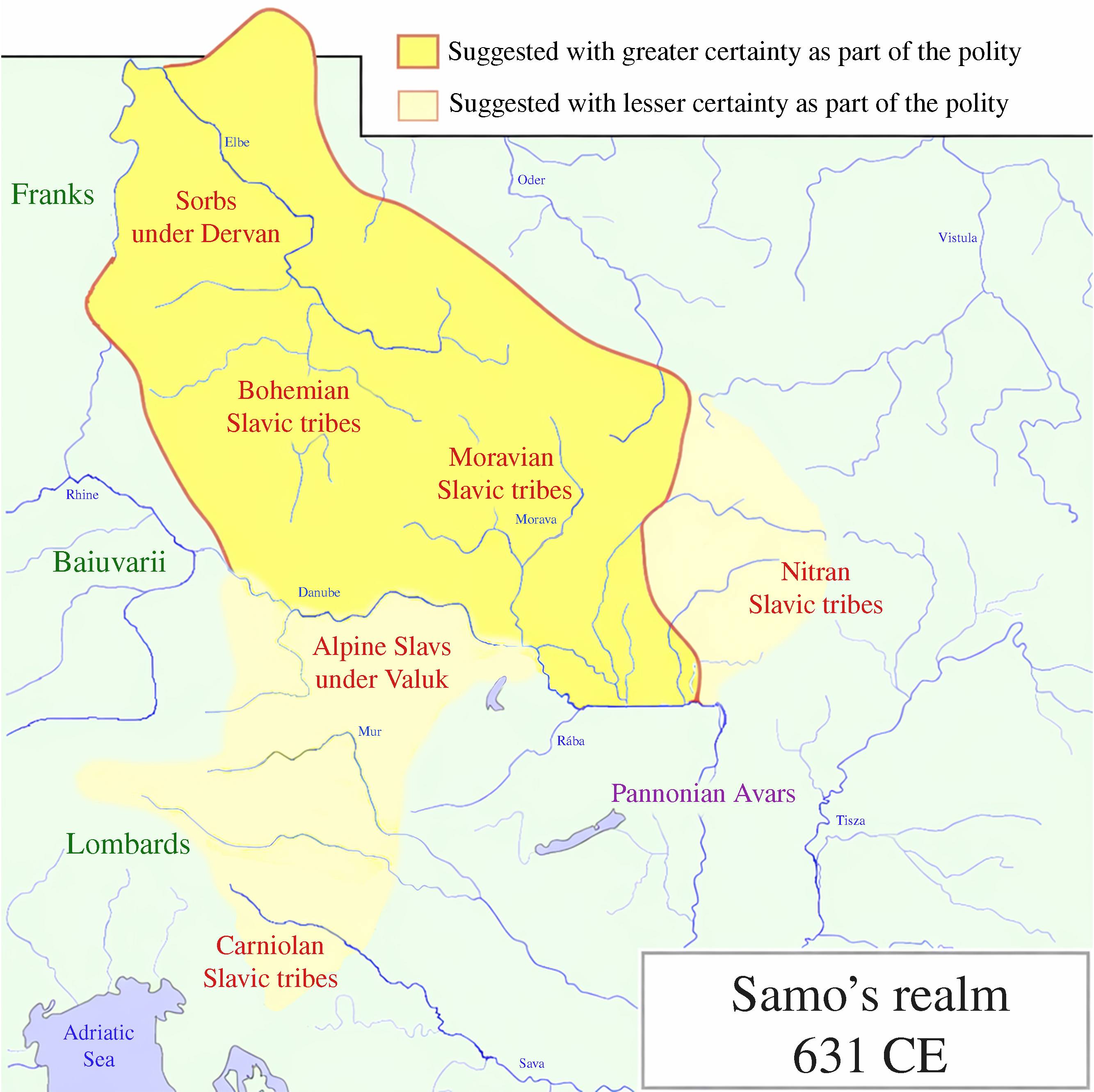
Alpine Slavs in 631 in Samo's realm

The Slavic tribes migrated to the Alpine area after the westward departure of the Lombards (the last Germanic tribe) in 568, and, under intense pressure from Avars, established a Slavic settlement in the Eastern Alps. They came from two directions, North (via today's East Austria and Czech Republic), settling around today's Carinthia and west Styria, and South (via today's Slavonia), settling around what became central Slovenia and became known as the Alpine Slavs.

==== King Samo ====
From 623 to 624 or possibly 626 onwards, King Samo united the Alpine and Western Slavs against both the Avars and Germanic peoples and established what is referred to as Samo's Kingdom. Following Samo's death around 658, they formed independent geopolitical entities: duchy of Carantania, and Carniola, later duchy Carniola. While the Avars temporarily reclaimed surrounding territories, Frankish King Charlemagne decisively defeated them in 803, bringing the entire region under Western European influence.

== Middle Ages ==
=== Carantania to Carinthia ===
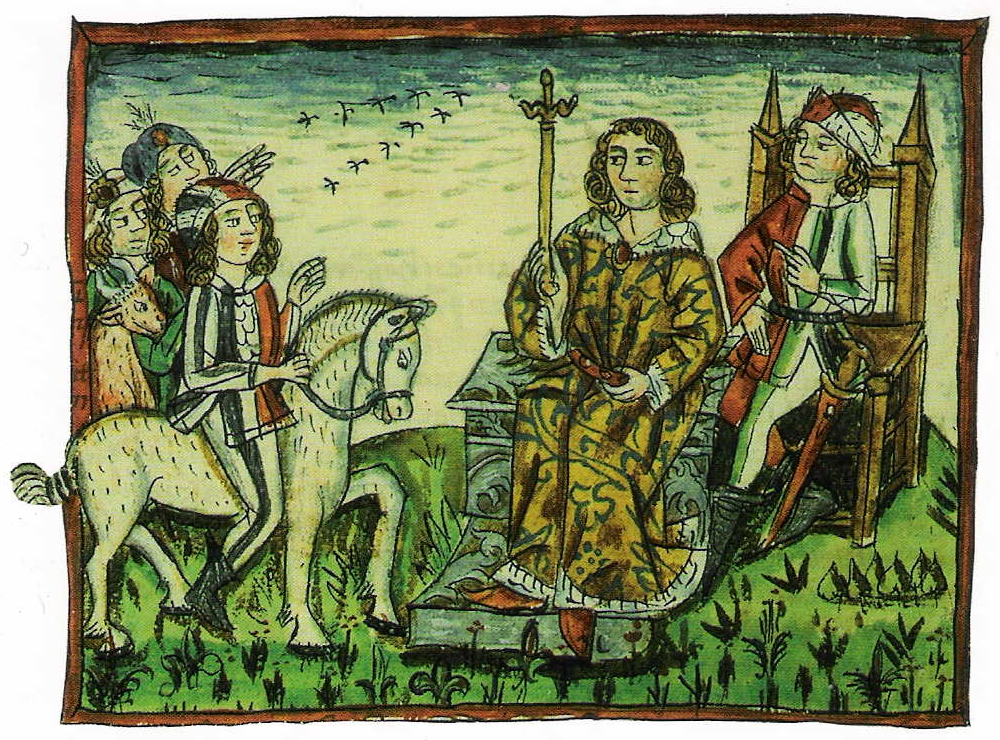
The installation of the Dukes in Carinthia, carried out in an ancient ritual in Slovene until 1414.

In 745, Carantania and the rest of Slavic-populated territories, being pressured by newly consolidated Avar power, submitted to Bavarian overrule and were, together with the Duchy of Bavaria, incorporated into the Carolingian Empire. The Carantanians, particularly the Carinthian Slovenes, were the first Slavic people to accept Christianity. They were mostly Christianized by Irish missionaries, among them Modestus, known as the "Apostle of Carantanians". The eastern part of Carantania was ruled again by Avars between 745 and 795.

Carniola, too, came under the Franks, and was Christianized from Aquileia. Following the anti-Frankish rebellion of Liudewit in 818, the Franks removed the Carantanian princes, replacing them with their own border dukes. Consequently, the Frankish feudal system reached the Slovene territory. Under Emperor Arnulf of Carinthia, Carantania, briefly emerged as a regional power, but was destroyed by the Hungarian invasions in the late 9th century.

Carantania-Carinthia rose again as an autonomous administrative unit in 976, when Emperor Otto I, "the Great", after deposing the Duke of Bavaria, Henry II, "the Quarreller", split the lands held by him and made Carinthia the sixth duchy of the Holy Roman Empire in 976, but old Carantania never developed into a unified realm.

In the late 10th and beginning of the 11th century, primarily because of the Hungarian threat, the southeastern border region of the German Empire was organized into so-called "marks" that organized the development of the Carniola, the Styria and the western Goriška/Gorizia. This consolidation and formation continued into the 14th century, led by feudal families such as the Dukes of Spanheim, the Counts of Gorizia, the Counts of Celje and finally the House of Habsburg.

=== Slovenes as a distinct ethnic group ===
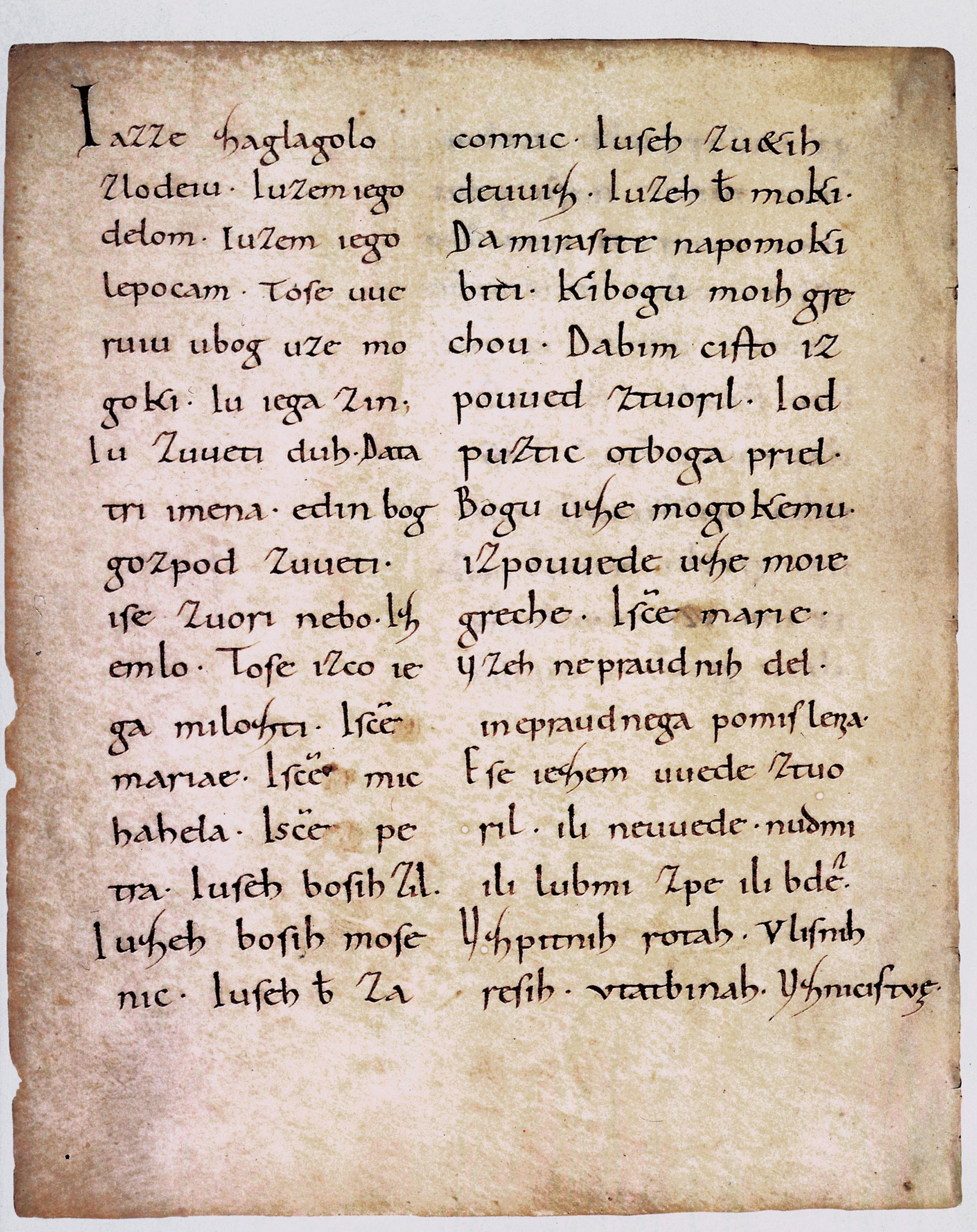
The Freising Manuscripts, dating from the 10th century A.D., most probably written in upper Carinthia, are the oldest surviving documents in Slovene.

The first mentions of a common Slovene ethnic identity, transcending regional boundaries, date from the 16th century.

During the 14th century, most of the Slovene Lands passed under the Habsburg rule. In 1335, Henry of Gorizia, Duke of Carinthia, Landgrave of Carniola and Count of Tyrol, died without a male heir. His daughter Margaret was able to keep the County of Tyrol, while the Wittelsbach emperor Louis IV passed Carinthia and the Carniolan march to Duke Albert II of Austria. Therefore, most of the territory became a hereditary land of the Habsburg monarchy. Carinthia and Carniola remained a semi-autonomous state with its own constitutional structure.

The counts of Celje, a feudal family from this area who in 1436 acquired the title of state princes, were powerful competitors of the house of Habsburg for some time. This large dynasty, important at a European political level, had its seat in Slovene territory but died out in 1456. Its estates fell to the Habsburgs, who retained control until the beginning of the 20th century. Patria del Friuli ruled the western portion of the lands that would later become Slovenia until Venetian takeover in 1420.

Most Slovenes lived in the administrative region known as Inner Austria, forming the majority of the population of the Duchy of Carniola and the County of Gorizia and Gradisca, as well as of Lower Styria and southern Carinthia. Germanization significantly diminished the extent of Slovene-speaking areas..

Slovenes also inhabited most of the territory of the Imperial Free City of Trieste, comprising a minority of its population.

At the end of the Middle Ages, the Turkish raids inflicted serious economic and demographic setbacks. In 1515, a widespread peasant revolt enveloped Slovene territory. In 1572 and 1573 the Croatian-Slovenian peasant revolt wrought havoc. Such uprisings, continued throughout the 17th century.

== Early modern period ==
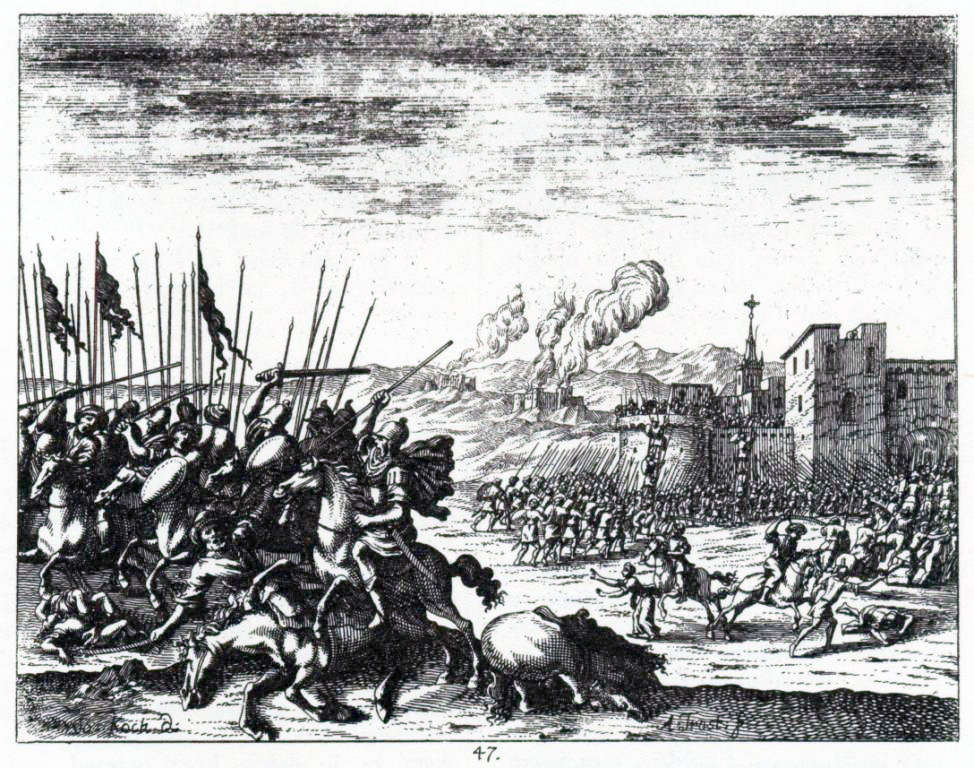
The Ottoman army battling the Habsburgs in present-day Slovenia during the Great Turkish War.

In the 16th century, the Protestant Reformation spread across Slovene lands. The first vernacular books were written by Protestant preacher Primož Trubar and his followers, establishing the basis for standard Slovene. In the second half of the 16th century, a vernacular translation of the Bible was produced by Jurij Dalmatin. During the Counter-Reformation in the late 16th and 17th centuries, led by Ljubljana bishop Thomas Chrön and Seckau Martin Brenner, almost all Protestants were expelled (except in Prekmurje). Nevertheless, their legacy survived, which was partially incorporated in the Catholic Counter-Reformation in the 17th century. The old Slovene orthography, also known as Bohorič's alphabet, developed by Protestants in the 16th century, remained in use until the mid-19th century.

Between the 15th and the 17th centuries, the Slovene Lands suffered many calamities. Many areas, especially in southern Slovenia, were devastated by the Ottoman–Habsburg wars. Ottomans destroyed many flourishing towns, including Vipavski Križ and Kostanjevica na Krki. The Carniolan noblemen's army defeated the Ottomans in the Battle of Sisak of 1593, ending the immediate Ottoman threat, although sporadic Ottoman incursions continued.

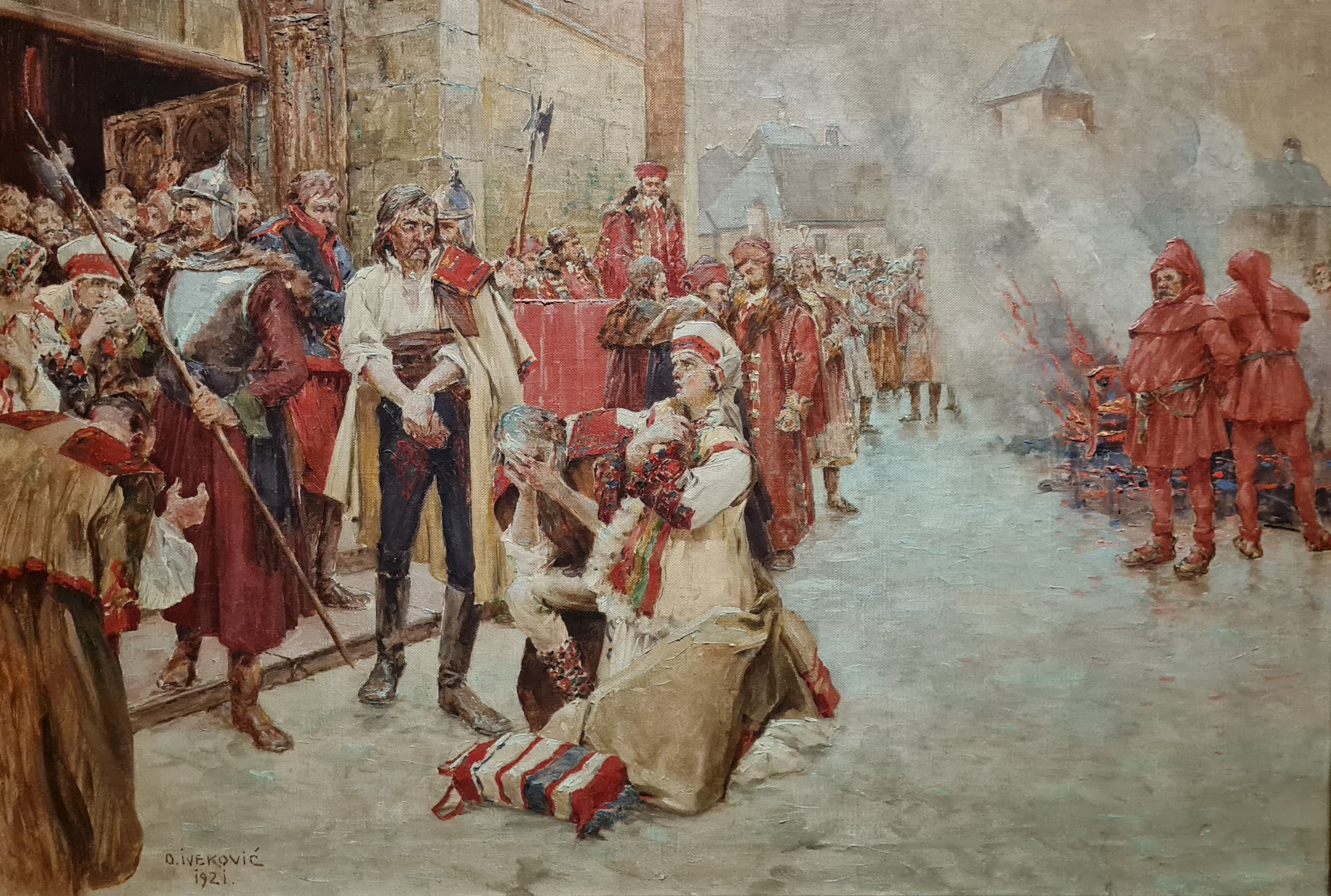
The execution of Matija Gubec, leader of the Croatian–Slovene Peasant Revolt, in 1573.

In the 16th and 17th centuries, western Slovene regions became battlefields in the wars between the Habsburgs and the Venetian Republic, most notably the War of Gradisca, which was largely fought in Goriška.

After the dissolution of the Republic of Venice in 1797, Venetian Slovenia passed to the Austrian Empire and then joined the French-administered Illyrian Provinces established by Napoleon, the Austrian Empire, and Austria-Hungary. Slovenes inhabited most of Carniola, the southern part of the duchies of Carinthia and Styria, the northern and eastern areas of the Austrian Littoral, as well as Prekmurje in the Kingdom of Hungary. Industrialization was accompanied by construction of railroads, but urbanization was limited.

The late 17th century featured intellectual and artistic activity. Many Italian Baroque artists, mostly architects and musicians, settled there, and contributed to local culture. Artists including Francesco Robba, Andrea Pozzo, Vittore Carpaccio and Giulio Quaglio worked in the Slovenian territory, while scientists such as Johann Weikhard von Valvasor and Johannes Gregorius Thalnitscher contributed to scholarly activities.

== Age of Enlightenment to the national movement ==
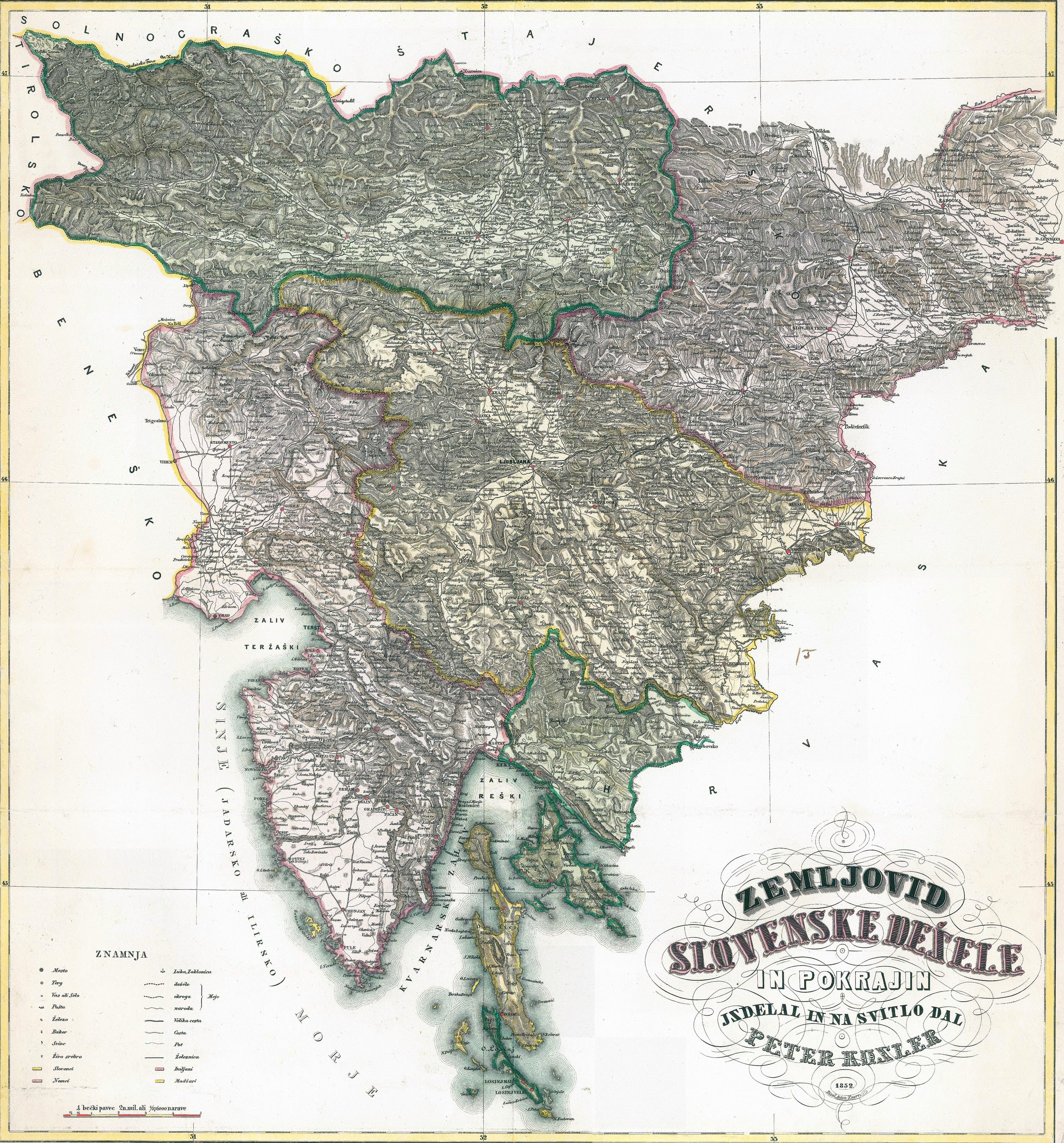
Peter Kosler's map of the Slovene Lands, designed during the Spring of Nations in 1848, became the symbol of the quest for a United Slovenia.

Between the early 18th century and early 19th century, peace came to the Slovene lands, with moderate economic development starting in the mid-18th century. Trieste was declared a free port in 1718, boosting economic activity throughout western parts Slovene Lands. The Hapsburg's political, administrative and economic reforms lifted the peasantry and the emerging bourgeoisie.

In the late 18th century, standardarization of Slovene began, promoted by clergymen such as Marko Pohlin and Jurij Japelj. Peasant-writers began using and promoting Slovene vernacular. This popular movement, known as bukovniki, started among Carinthian Slovenes. Slovene literature emerged again, most notably in the works of playwright Anton Tomaž Linhart and poet Valentin Vodnik. Slovene culture was reinforced in the 18th century by the Zois Circle. However, German remained the main language of culture, administration and education well into the 19th century.

Between 1805 and 1813, Slovene territory was part of the autonomous Illyrian Provinces in the French Empire, with its capital in Ljubljana. The short-lived French rule contributed to greater national self-confidence and awareness of freedoms. While the French did not entirely abolish the feudal system, their rule familiarised the inhabitants with the French Revolution and with bourgeois society. They introduced equality before the law, compulsory military service. a uniform tax system, introduced modern administration, separated powers between the state and the Church, and nationalised the judiciary.

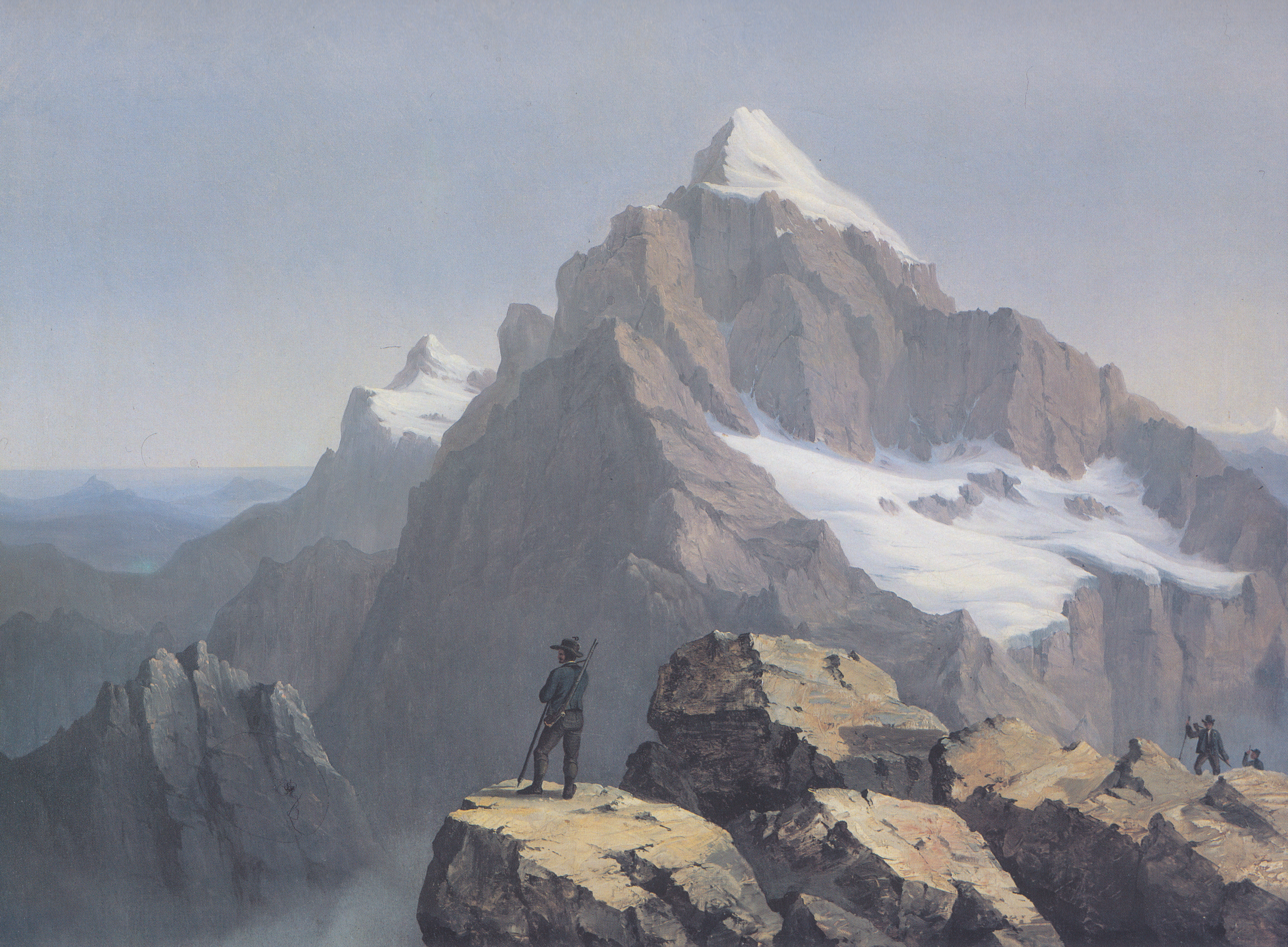
Painting of Mount Triglav by Markus Pernhart, a Carinthian Slovene artist. In the Romantic era, Triglav became one of the symbols of Slovene identity.

In August 1813, Austria declared war on France. Austrian troops invaded the Illyrian Provices and took back all Slovene lands. A distinct Slovene national consciousness developed, leading to interest in Slovene political unification. In the 1820s and 1840s, interest in Slovene language and folklore grew. Philologists collected folk songs. Slovene activists, mostly from Styria and Carinthia, embraced the Illyrian movement that started in neighboring Croatia and aimed at uniting South Slavic peoples. Pan-Slavic and Austro-Slavic visions gained importance. The intellectual circle around the philologist Matija Čop and Romantic poet France Prešeren affirmed the idea of Slovene linguistic and cultural individuality, rejecting the idea of merging Slovenes into a wider Slavic nation.

In 1848, a mass political and popular movement for United Slovenia (Zedinjena Slovenija) emerged as part of the Spring of Nations movement within the Austrian Empire. Slovene activists demanded unification of Slovene-speaking territories into a unified and autonomous Slovene kingdom within the Austrian Empire. Although the project failed, it served as a platform of Slovene political activity in the following decades.

== Clashing nationalisms in the late 19th century ==
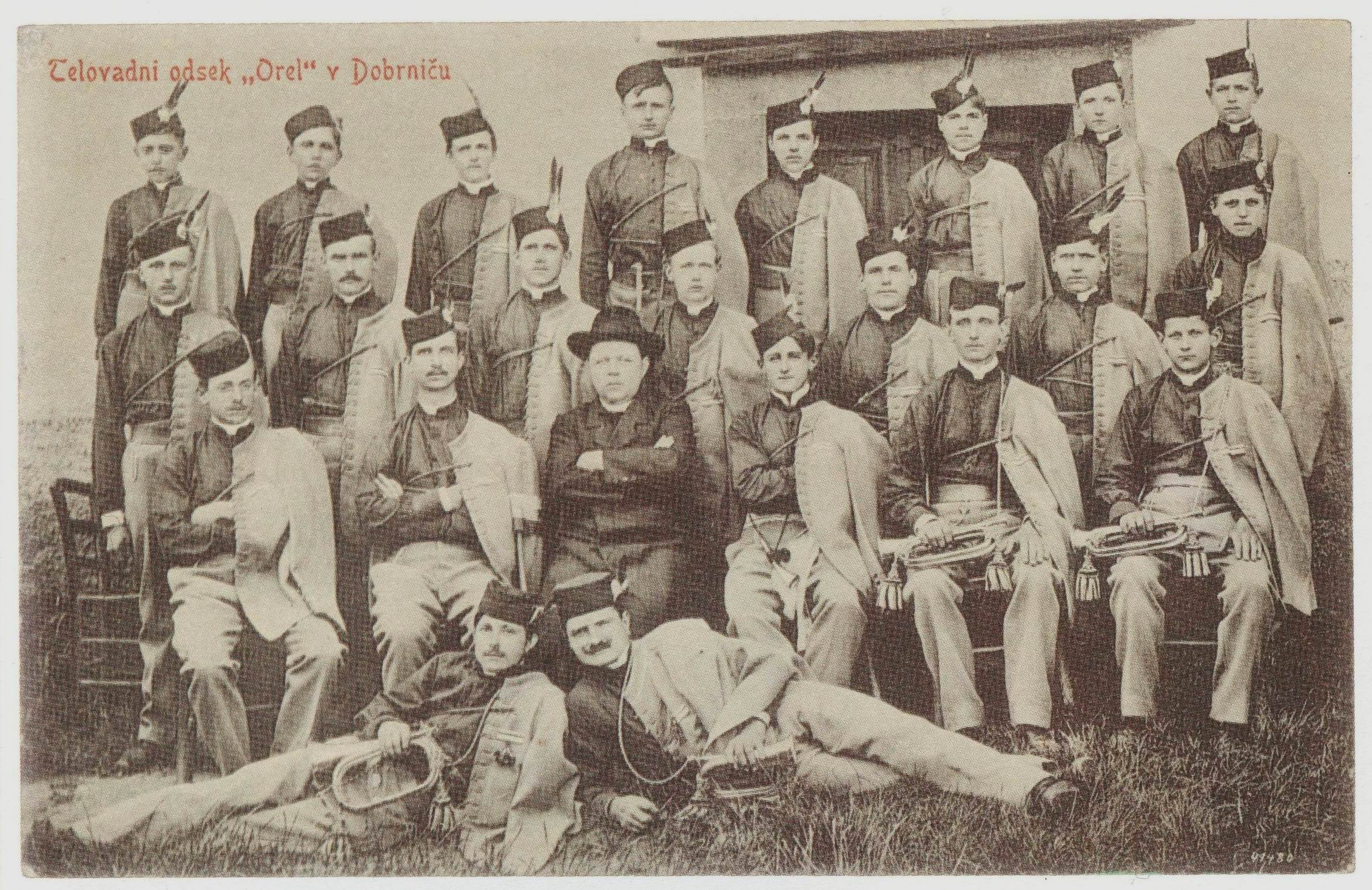
Members of the Catholic Orel association in Lower Carniola before World War One

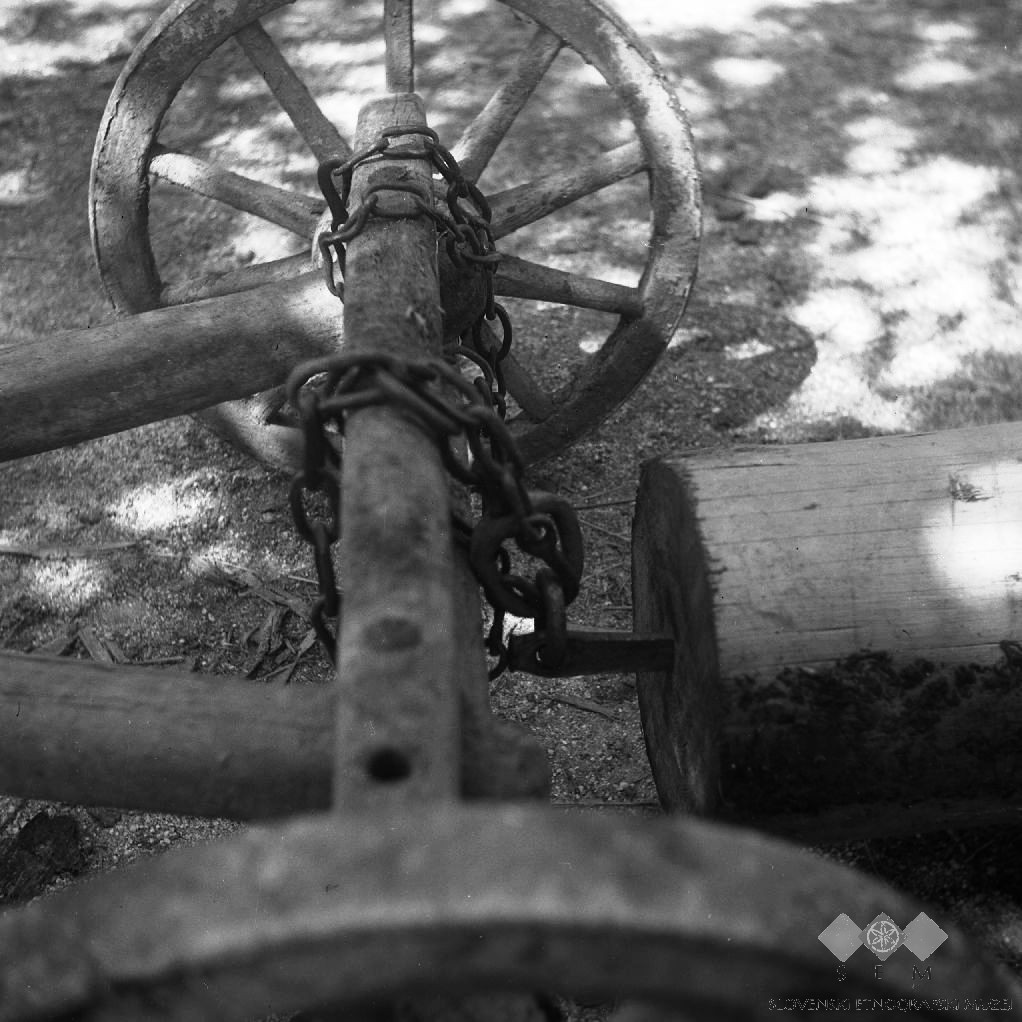
Part of a late 19th century cannon

Between 1880 and 1910, emigration was extensive; around 300,000 Slovenes (1 in 6) left, mostly to the US, but also to South America (the main part to Argentina), Germany, Egypt, and to larger cities in Austria-Hungary, especially Vienna and Graz. Literacy reached at 80–90%.

Between 1848 and 1918, numerous institutions (including theatres and publishing houses, as well as political, financial and cultural organisations) were founded in the so-called Slovene National Awakening. Despite their political and institutional fragmentation and lack of proper political representation, the Slovenes were able to establish a functioning national infrastructure.

With the introduction of a constitution granting civil and political liberties in the Austrian Empire in 1860, the Slovene national movement gained force. Despite its internal differentiation among the conservative Old Slovenes and the progressive Young Slovenes, the Slovene nationals defended similar programs, calling for a cultural and political autonomy of the Slovene people. In the late 1860s and early 1870s, a series of mass rallies called tabori, modeled on the Irish monster meetings, were organized in support of the United Slovenia program. These rallies, attended by thousands of people, proved the allegiance of wider strata of the Slovene population to the ideas of national emancipation.

By the end of the 19th century, Slovenes had established a standardized language, and a thriving civil society. Literacy levels were among the highest in the Austro-Hungarian Empire, and numerous national associations were present at grassroots level. The idea of a common political entity of all South Slavs, known as Yugoslavia, emerged.

Since the 1880s, a fierce culture war between Catholic traditionalists and integralists on one side, and liberals, progressivists and anticlericals dominated Slovene political and public life, especially in Carniola. During the same period, the growth of industrialization intensified social tensions. Both Socialist and Christian socialist movements mobilized the masses. In 1905, the first Socialist mayor in the Austro-Hungarian Empire was elected in the Slovene mining town of Idrija on the list of the Yugoslav Social Democratic Party. In the same years, the Christian socialist activist Janez Evangelist Krek organized hundreds of workers and agricultural cooperatives throughout the Slovene countryside.

At the turn of the 20th century, national struggles in ethnically mixed areas (especially in Carinthia, Trieste and in Lower Styrian towns) dominated the political and social lives of the citizenry. By the 1910s, the national struggles between Slovene and Italian speakers in the Austrian Littoral, and Slovene and German speakers, overshadowed other political conflicts and brought about a nationalist radicalization on both sides.

In the last two decades before World War One, Slovene arts and literature experienced one of its most flourishing periods, with numerous talented modernist authors, painters and architects. The most important authors of this period were Ivan Cankar, Oton Župančič and Dragotin Kette, while Ivan Grohar and Rihard Jakopič were among the most talented Slovene visual artists of the time.

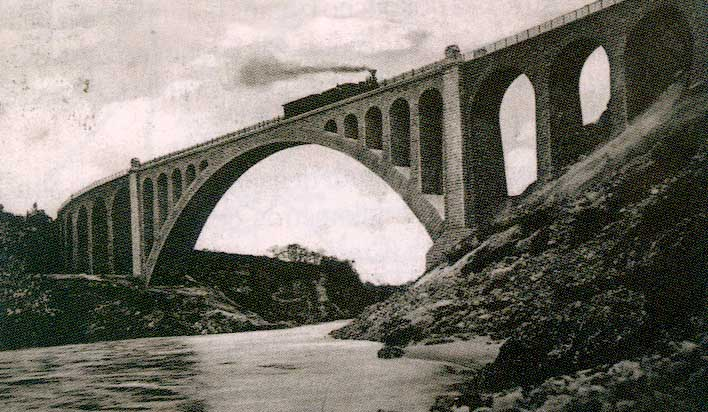
The Solkan Bridge, built in 1906

After the Ljubljana earthquake of 1895, the city experienced a rapid modernization under the charismatic Liberal nationalist mayors Ivan Hribar and Ivan Tavčar. Architects like Max Fabiani and Ciril Metod Koch introduced their own version of the Vienna Secession architecture to Ljubljana. In the same period, the Adriatic port of Trieste became an increasingly important center of Slovene economy, culture and politics. By 1910, around a third of the city population was Slovene, and the number of Slovenes in Trieste was higher than in Ljubljana.

At the turn of the 20th century, hundreds of thousands of Slovenes emigrated to other countries, mostly to the United States, but also to South America, Germany, Egypt and to larger cities in the Austro-Hungarian Empire, especially Zagreb and Vienna. It has been calculated that around 300,000 Slovenes emigrated between 1880 and 1910, which means that one in six Slovenes left their homeland.

== Emigration ==
The period between the 1880s and World War I saw a mass emigration from the present-day Slovenia to America. The largest group of Slovenes eventually settled in Cleveland, Ohio, and the surrounding area. The second-largest group settled in Chicago, principally on the Lower West Side. Many Slovene immigrants went to southwestern Pennsylvania, southeastern Ohio and the state of West Virginia to work in the coal mines and lumber industry. Some also went to the Pittsburgh or Youngstown, Ohio areas, to work in the steel mills, as well as Minnesota's Iron Range, to work in the iron mines.

== World War I ==
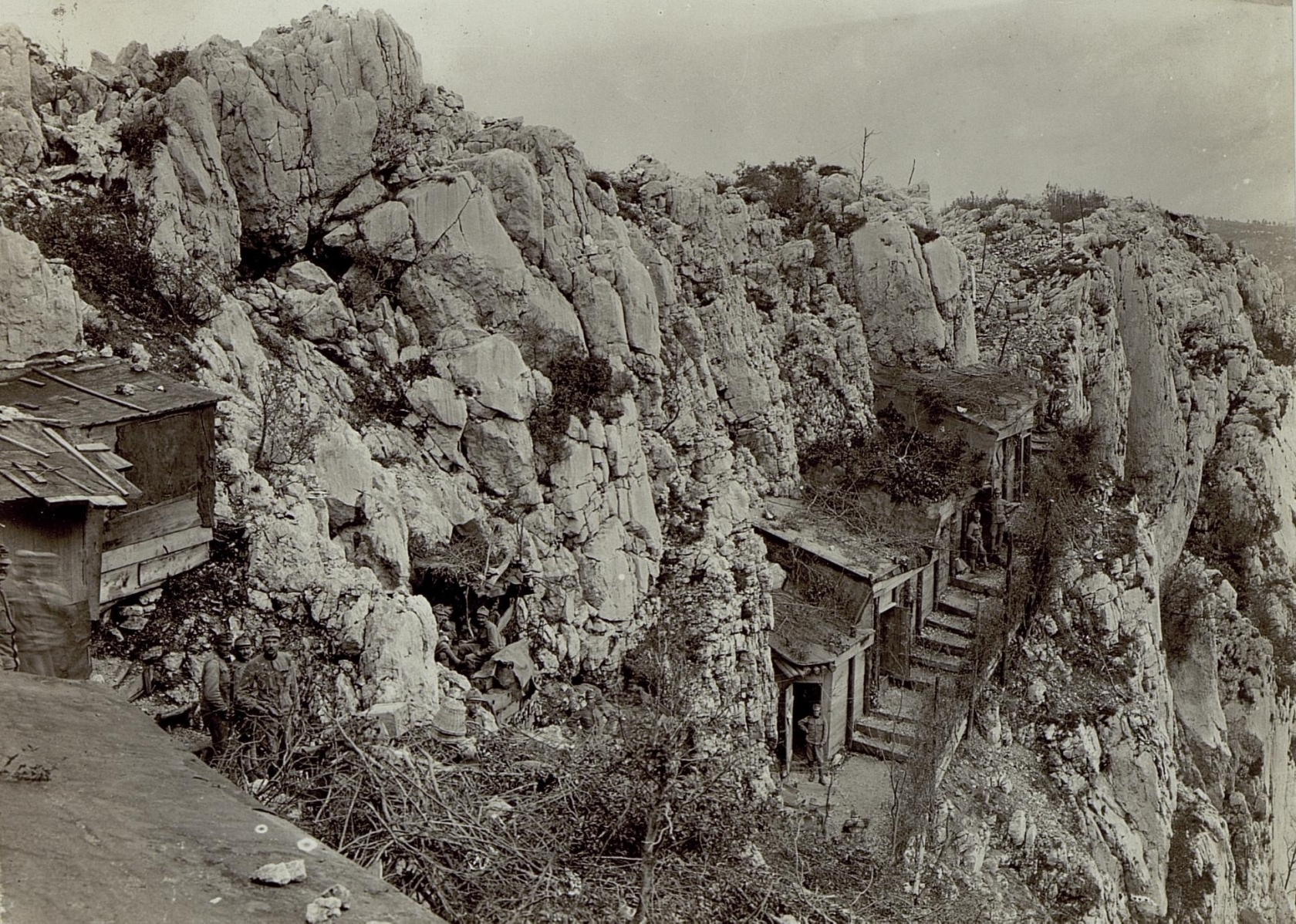
The Battles of the Isonzo took place mostly in rugged mountainous areas above the Soča River.

In World War I hundreds of thousands of Slovene men were conscripted into the Austro-Hungarian Army. Heavy casualties ensued, particularly the twelve Battles of the Isonzo. Over 30,000 died.

Hundreds of thousands of Slovenes from Princely County of Gorizia and Gradisca were resettled in refugee camps in Italy and Austria. While the refugees in Austria received decent treatment, Slovene refugees in Italian camps were treated as state enemies, and several thousand died of malnutrition and disease between 1915 and 1918. Entire areas of the Slovene Littoral were destroyed.

The Treaty of Rapallo of 1920 left approximately 327,000 out of the total population of 1.3 million Slovenes in Italy. After the fascists took power in Italy, they were subjected to a policy of violent Fascist Italianization. This caused the mass emigration of Slovenes, especially the middle class, from the Slovene Littoral and Trieste to Yugoslavia and South America. Those who remained organized several connected networks of both passive and armed resistance. The best known was the militant anti-fascist organization TIGR, formed in 1927 to fight Fascist oppression of the Slovene and Croat populations in the Julian March.

Slovenians suffered greatly fighting at the bloody Soviet front. Some 500 Slovenes served as volunteers in the Serbian army, while a smaller group led by Captain Ljudevit Pivko, served as volunteers in the Italian Army. In the war's final year, many predominantly Slovene regiments in the Austro-Hungarian Army mutinied; the best-known was the Judenburg Rebellion in May 1918.

== State of Slovenes, Croats and Serbs ==
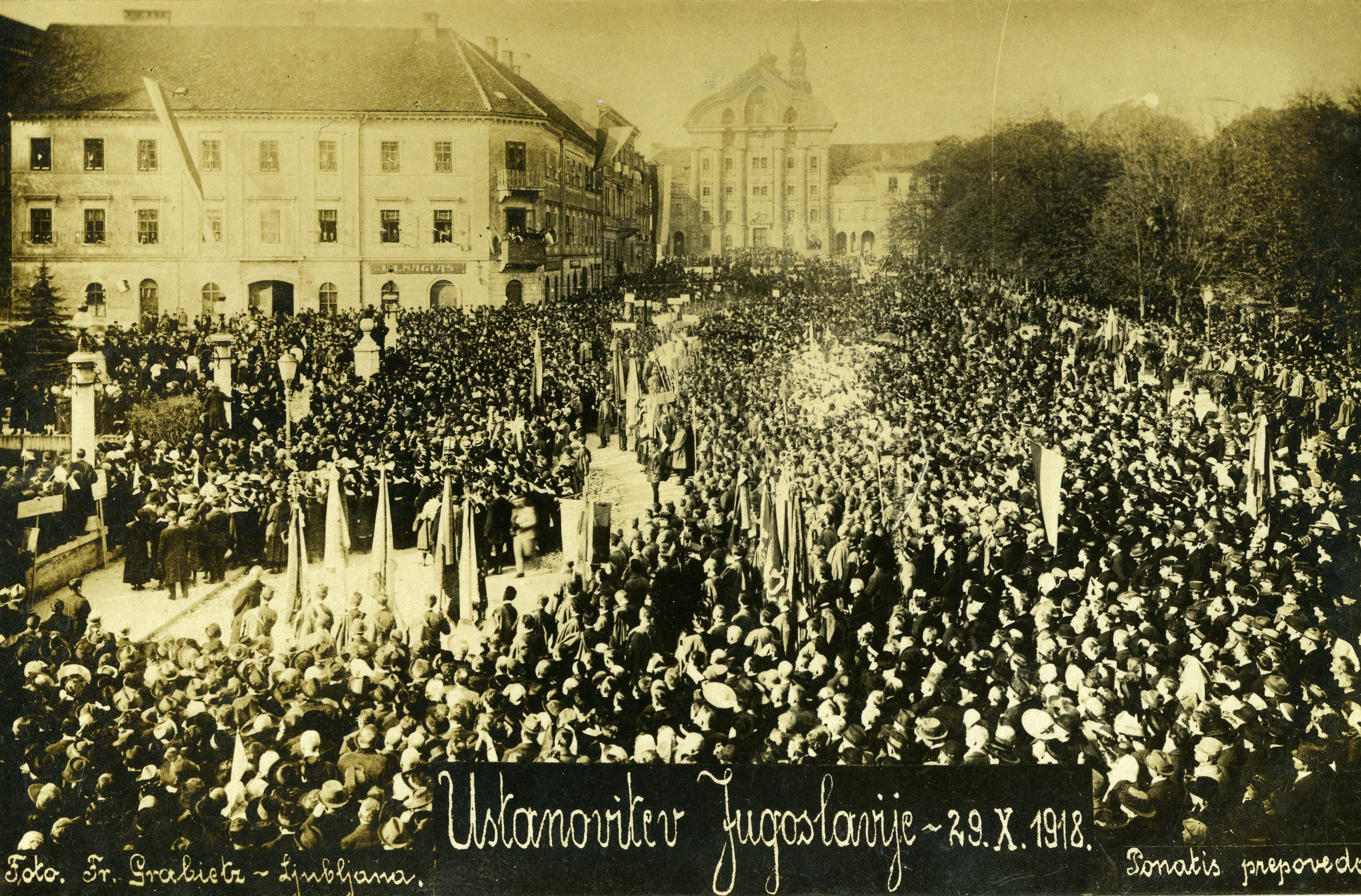
The proclamation of the State of Slovenes, Croats and Serbs at Congress Square in Ljubljana on 20 October 1918

The great powers threatened to divide Slovene territory among several countries (Treaty of London, 1915), Slovenes had tried to advance their national position in the common state including Croats and Serbs in the Habsburg Monarchy. The demand, known as the May Declaration, was given by Slovene, Croatian and Serbian parliamentarians to the Vienna Parliament in spring 1917.

The monarchy initially rejected the request, and subsequent government initiatives for the federalisation of the monarchy (for example, the October manifesto of Emperor Charles, which leaned towards independence) was rejected by most Slovenian politicians. The preservation of the reformed state was defended by the former head of the SPP and the last Provincial Commander-in-Chief of Carniola, Ivan Šusteršič, who had few supporters and little influence.

The SPP launched a movement for self-determination, demanding the creation of a semi-independent South Slavic state under Habsburg rule. The proposal was picked up by most Slovene parties, and a mass mobilization of Slovene civil society followed, known as the Declaration Movement. By early 1918, more than 200,000 signatures had been collected in favor of the SPP proposal.

Following the dissolution of Austro-Hungarian Empire, a National Council of Slovenes, Croats and Serbs took power in Zagreb on 6 October 1918. On 29 October independence was declared by a national gathering in Ljubljana, and by the Croatian parliament, declaring the establishment of the new State of Slovenes, Croats and Serbs. On 1 December 1918 the State of Slovenes, Croats and Serbs merged with Serbia, becoming part of the new Kingdom of Serbs, Croats and Slovenes, itself renamed in 1929 to Kingdom of Yugoslavia.

Slovenes whose territory fell under the rule of neighboring states Italy, Austria and Hungary, were subjected to policies of assimilation.

=== Border with Austria ===
An armed dispute started between the Slovenes and German Austria for the regions of Lower Styria and southern Carinthia. In November 1918, Rudolf Maister seized Maribor and surrounding areas of Lower Styria in the name of the Yugoslav state. The Austrian government of Styria refrained from military intervention and opposed a referendum. The vast majority of Lower Styria was ethnically Slovenian, while Maribor, Ptuj, and Celje had German-speaking majorities, partly as a result of Slovene assimilation. Maribor and Lower Styria were eventually awarded to Yugoslavia in the Treaty of Saint-Germain.

Around the same time, volunteers led by Franjo Malgaj attempted to take control of southern Carinthia. Fighting in Carinthia lasted between December 1918 and June 1919, when the Slovene volunteers and the regular Serbian Army occupied Klagenfurt. In compliance with the Treaty of Saint-Germain, Yugoslav forces withdrew from Klagenfurt, while a referendum was to be held in other parts of southern Carinthia. In October 1920, the majority in southern Carinthia voted to remain in Austria, and only a small portion of the province (around Dravograd and Guštanj) was awarded to the Kingdom. With the Treaty of Trianon, the Kingdom was awarded the Slovene-inhabited Prekmurje region, which had belonged to Hungary since the 10th century.

=== Border with Italy ===
In exchange for joining the Allied Powers in the First World War, the Kingdom of Italy, under the secret Treaty of London (1915) and later Treaty of Rapallo (1920), was granted rule over much of Slovene territories. These included a quarter of Slovene ethnic territory, including areas that were exclusively Slovene. The population of the affected areas was approximately 327,000 of the total of 1.3 million.

=== Border with Austria ===
Following a plebiscite in October 1920, the Slovene-speaking southern Carinthia was ceded to Austria. With the Treaty of Trianon, the Kingdom of Yugoslavia was awarded the mostly Slovene-inhabited Prekmurje region, formerly part of Austria-Hungary. Slovenes living in territories that fell under the rule of the neighbouring states—Italy, Austria, and Hungary—were subjected to assimilation.

== Kingdom of Yugoslavia ==
In 1921, against the vote of 70% of Slovene MPs, a centralist constitution was passed in the Kingdom of Serbs, Croats and Slovenes. Despite it, Slovenes managed to maintain a high level of cultural autonomy, and both the economy and the arts prospered. Slovene politicians participated in almost all Yugoslav governments, and conservative Slovene leader Anton Korošec briefly served as the only non-Serbian Prime Minister of Yugoslavia in the period between the two world wars.

The main territory of Slovenia, was the most industrialized and westernized in Yugoslavia and became the main center of industrial production; Slovenian industrial production was four times greater than Serbia's and twenty-two times greater than in Vardar Banovina.

The interwar period brought further industrialization, with rapid economic growth in the 1920s followed by a relatively successful adjustment to the 1929 economic crisis. This development especially affected the Ljubljana Basin, the Central Sava Valley, parts of Slovenian Carinthia, and urban areas around Celje and Maribor.

Tourism experienced a great expansion: resort areas like Bled and Rogaška Slatina gained an international reputation. Elsewhere, agriculture and forestry remained predominant. Nevertheless, Slovenia emerged as one of the most prosperous and economically dynamic areas in Yugoslavia. Arts, literature, and architecture prospered. The two largest Slovenian cities, Ljubljana and Maribor, underwent extensive urban renewal and modernization. Architects such as Jože Plečnik, Ivan Vurnik and Vladimir Šubic introduced modernist architecture to Slovenia.

In 1929, the Kingdom of Serbs, Croats and Slovenes was renamed Kingdom of Yugoslavia. The constitution was abolished and civil liberties suspended, while centralist pressure intensified. Slovenia was renamed Drava Banovina. During the interwar period, Slovene voters strongly supported the conservative SPP, which unsuccessfully fought for the autonomy of Slovenia within a federalized Yugoslavia. In 1935, however, the SPP joined the pro-regime Yugoslav Radical Community, opening space for a left wing autonomist movement.

The 1930s economic crisis created fertile ground for both left and right radicalisms. In 1937, the Communist Party of Slovenia was founded as an autonomous party within the Communist Party of Yugoslavia. Between 1938 and 1941, left liberal, Christian left and agrarian forces established relations with members of the (illegal) Communist party, aiming at establishing a broad anti-Fascist coalition.

=== Fascist Italianization of Littoral Slovenes and resistance ===
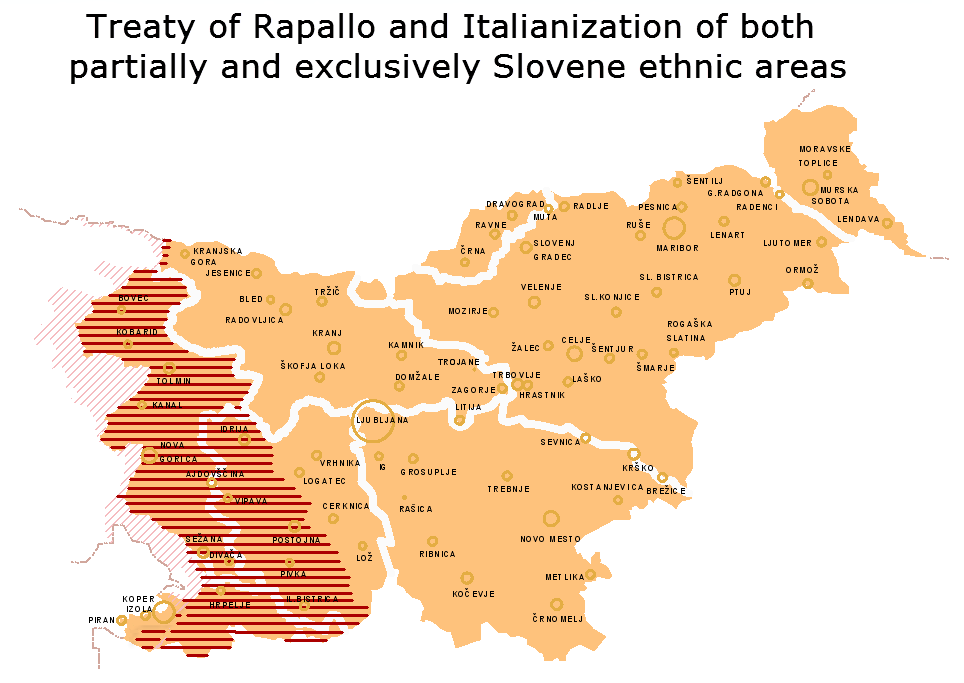
The annexed western quarter of Slovene ethnic territory, and approximately 327,000 out of the total population of 1.3 million Slovenes, were subjected to forced Fascist Italianization. On the map of present-day Slovenia with its traditional regions' boundaries.

With a secret Treaty of London in 1915, the Kingdom of Italy was promised large portions of Austrian-Hungarian territory by the Triple Entente, in exchange for joining the Entente against the Central Powers in World War I. After the Central Powers were defeated in 1918, Italy went on to annex some of the promised territories, after signing the treaty of Rapallo with the new Kingdom of Serbs, Croats and Slovenes in 1920. However, these areas also included a quarter of Slovene ethnic territory and approximately 327.000 out of total population of 1.3 million Slovenes, were annexed by the Kingdom of Italy The treaty left half a million Slavs (besides Slovenes also Croatians) inside Italy, while only a few hundred Italians in the fledgling Yugoslav state".

Trieste was at the end of 19th century de facto the largest Slovene city, having had more Slovene inhabitants than Ljubljana. After being ceded from the multi-ethnic Austria, Italian lower middle class—who felt most threatened by the city's Slovene middle class—sought to make Trieste "città italianissima", committing series of attacks, led by Black Shirts, on Slovene shops, libraries, lawyer offices, and the central place of the rival community in Narodni dom. Forced Italianization followed and by the mid-1930s, several thousand Slovenes, especially intellectuals from Trieste region, emigrated to the Kingdom of Yugoslavia and to South America.

The present-day Slovenian municipalities of Idrija, Ajdovščina, Vipava, Kanal, Postojna, Pivka, and Ilirska Bistrica, were subjected to forced Italianization. The Slovene minority in Italy (1920-1947) lacked any minority protection under international or domestic law. Clashes between the Italian authorities and Fascist squads on one side, and the local Slovene population on the other, started as early as 1920, culminating with the burning of the Narodni dom, the Slovenian National Hall of Trieste. After all Slovene minority organizations in Italy had been suppressed, the militant anti-fascist organization TIGR was formed in 1927 in order to fight Fascist violence. The anti-Fascist guerrilla movement continued throughout the late 1920s and 1930s.

== World War II and annexation ==
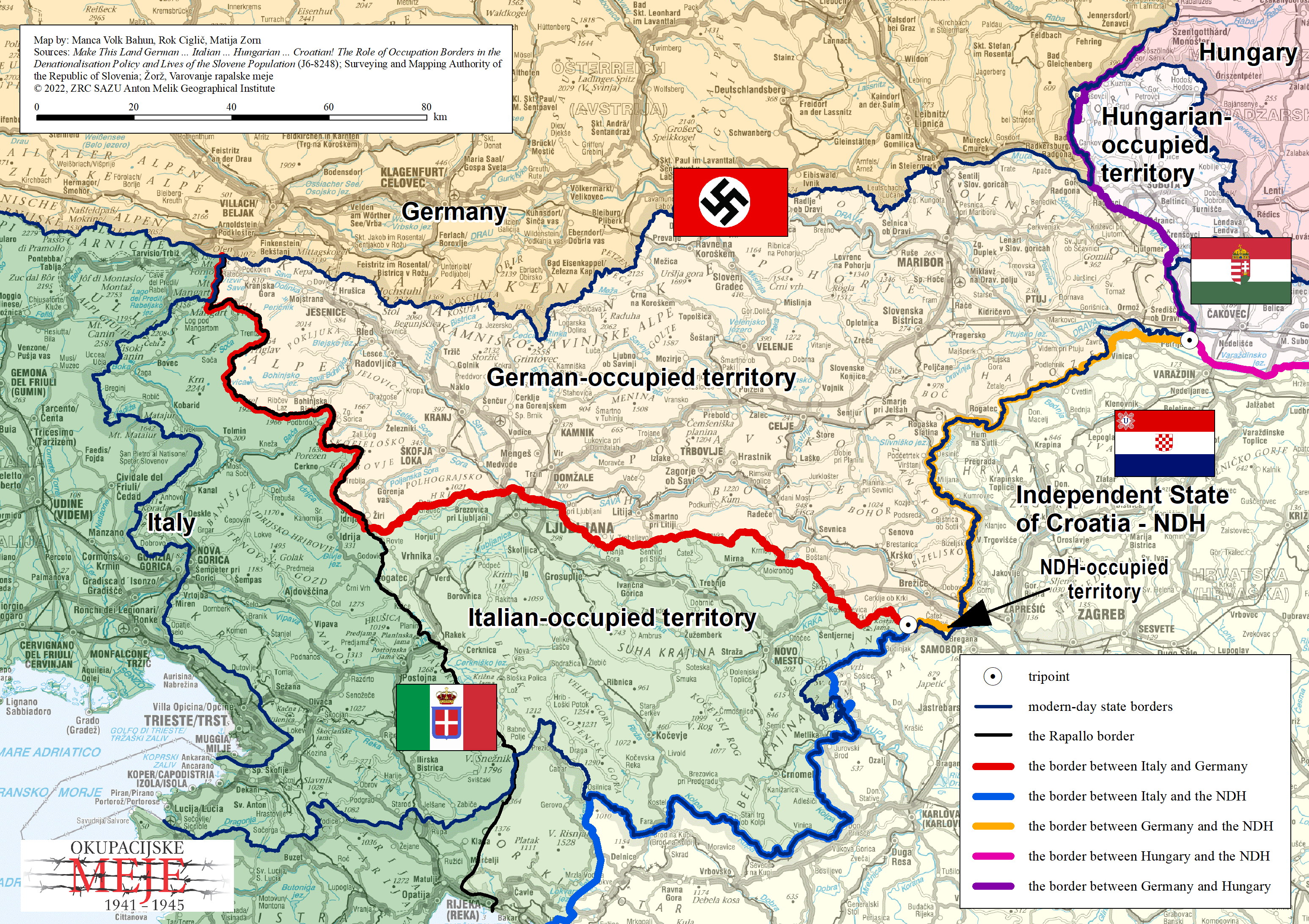
Border lines and occupied territories

World War II in the Slovene Lands started in April 1941 and continued until May 1945. The Slovene Lands were in a unique situation. In addition to getting trisected, Drava Banovina (roughly today's Slovenia) was the only part that experienced a further step—absorption and annexation into neighboring Nazi Germany, Fascist Italy, and Hungary. Slovene-settled territory was divided largely between Nazi Germany and Fascist Italy, with smaller territories occupied and annexed by Hungary and Croatia.

== Titoist Yugoslavia ==
Socialist Republic of Slovenia within the Socialist Federal Republic of Yugoslavia

Coat of arms of the Socialist Republic of Slovenia

Following the re-establishment of Yugoslavia at the end of World War II, Slovenia became part of the Democratic Federal Yugoslavia, declared on 29 November 1943. A communist state was established, but because of the Tito–Stalin split, economic and personal freedoms were broader than in the Eastern Bloc. In 1947, Italy ceded most of the Julian March to Yugoslavia, and Slovenia thus regained the Slovenian Littoral. The towns of Koper, Izola, and Piran, Italian-populated urban enclaves saw mass ethnic Italian and anti-Communist emigration (part of the Istrian Exodus) due to the ongoing Foibe massacres and other revenge for Italian war crimes and due to their fear of Communism, which by 1947 had nationalised all private property.

Forced collectivisation was unsuccessfully attempted from 1949 to 1953, followed by gradual economic liberalisation, known as workers self-management, introduced under the advice and supervision of Slovene Marxist theoretician and Communist leader Edvard Kardelj, the main theorist of the Titoist path to socialism. Suspected opponents of this policy from within and outside the party were persecuted and thousands were sent to Goli otok (where opponents from the Tito-Stalin split, were sent).

=== Stalinist period ===
Between 1945 and 1948, a wave of political repression took place across Yugoslavia. Thousands of people were imprisoned for their political beliefs. Several tens of thousands of Slovenes emigrated immediately after the war in fear of Communist persecution. Many settled in Argentina, which became the center of Slovenian anti-Communism. More than 50,000 followed in the next decade, frequently for economic reasons. These later waves mostly broke in Canada and in Australia, but also in other western countries.

=== The 1948 Tito–Stalin split and aftermath ===
In 1948, the Tito–Stalin split took place. Following the split, the political repression immediately worsened, as it extended to Communists accused of Stalinism. Hundreds of Slovenes were imprisoned in the concentration camp of Goli Otok, together with thousands of people of other nationalities. Show trials took place in Slovenia between 1945 and 1950, most importantly the Nagode Trial against democratic intellectuals and left liberal activists (1946) and the Dachau trials (1947–1949), where former inmates of Nazi concentration camps were accused of collaboration. Roman Catholic clergy also suffered persecution. The case of the Bishop of Ljubljana Anton Vovk, who was doused with gasoline and set on fire by Communist activists during a pastoral visit to Novo Mesto in January 1952, echoed in the western press.

=== 1950s: industrialization ===
The port of Trieste remained free until 1954, until the short-lived Free Territory of Trieste was divided among Italy and Yugoslavia, thus giving Slovenia access to the Aegean Sea. This division was ratified in 1975 with the Treaty of Osimo, which gave legal sanction to Slovenia's long disputed western border. From the 1950s, the People's Republic of Slovenia enjoyed a relatively wide autonomy.

In the late 1950s, Slovenia was the first Yugoslav republic to begin relative pluralization. A decade of industrialisation followed, accompanied by cultural and literary production, leading to tensions between the regime and dissident intellectuals. From the late 1950s onward, dissident circles started to form, mostly around short-lived independent journals, such as Revija 57 (1957–1958), which was the first independent intellectual journal in Yugoslavia and one of the first of this kind in the Communist bloc, and Perspektive (1960–1964). Among the most important critics were sociologist Jože Pučnik, poet Edvard Kocbek, and literary historian Dušan Pirjevec.

With further economic decentralization of Yugoslavia in 1965–66, Slovenia's domestic product was 2.5 times the average of Yugoslav republics.

=== 1960s: Self-management ===
By the late 1960s, the reformist faction gained control of the SCP and launching reforms aiming to modernize Slovenian society and economy. A new economic policy, known as workers self-management started to be implemented under the advice and supervision of the main theorist of the League of Communists, Slovene Edvard Kardelj.

=== 1970s: "Years of Lead" ===
In the 1970s Slovenian Adria Airways took flight, mostly focused on the growing tourist industry.

In 1973, this trend was stopped by the conservative faction of the League of Communists of Slovenia, backed by the Yugoslav Federal government. A period known as the "Years of Lead" (Slovene: svinčena leta) followed. During this period, censorship and repression of the press and artists increased, while freedom of speech declined. Many people were jailed because of their political beliefs.

Until the 1980s, the Socialist Republic of Slovenia enjoyed relatively broad autonomy within the federation. It was the most liberal communist state in Europe, and the passport of the Yugoslavia Federation allowed Yugoslavs to travel to more countries than any other socialist country during the Cold War. Many people worked in western countries, which reduced unemployment at home. After Tito's death in 1980 when the economic and political situation in Yugoslavia became very strained.

=== 1980s: Towards independence ===
In the 1980s, Slovenia experienced a rise of cultural pluralism. Numerous grass-roots political, artistic and intellectual movements emerged, including the Neue Slowenische Kunst, the Ljubljana school of psychoanalysis, and the Nova revija intellectual circle. By the mid-1980s, a reformist fraction, led by Milan Kučan, took control of the Slovenian Communist Party, starting a gradual reform towards controlled political pluralism.

The Yugoslav economic crisis of the 1980s increased the struggles within the Yugoslav Communist regime regarding the appropriate economic measures to be undertaken. Slovenia, which had less than 10% of the overall Yugoslav population, produced around a fifth of the country's GDP and a fourth of all Yugoslav exports. The political disputes around economic measures was echoed in the public sentiment, as many Slovenes felt they were being economically exploited, having to sustain an expensive and inefficient federal administration.

In 1987 and 1988, a series of clashes between the emerging civil society and the Communist regime culminated with the Slovene Spring. In 1987, a group of liberal intellectuals published a manifesto in the alternative Nova revija journal; in their so-called Contributions for the Slovenian National Program, they called for democratization and a greater independence for Slovenia. Some of the articles openly contemplated Slovenia's independence from Yugoslavia and the establishment of a parliamentary democracy. The manifesto was condemned by the Communist authorities, but the authors were not punished, and the journal was not suppressed (although the editorial board was forced to resign).

At the end of the same year, a strike broke out in the Litostroj manufacturing plant in Ljubljana, which led to the establishment of Yugoslavia's first independent trade union. Strike leaders established an independent political organization, called the Social Democratic Union of Slovenia. Soon afterwards, in mid May 1988, an independent Peasant Union of Slovenia was organized. Later in May, the Yugoslav Army arrested four Slovenian journalists of the alternative magazine Mladina, accusing them of revealing state secrets. The so-called Ljubljana trial triggered mass protests in Ljubljana and other Slovenian cities.

A mass democratic movement, coordinated by the Committee for the Defense of Human Rights, pushed the Communists towards democratic reforms. These events predated the Revolutions of 1989 in Eastern Europe by almost one year, but went largely unnoticed by international observers.

The confrontation between the Slovenian and Serbian Leagues of Communists (the latter being dominated by nationalist leader Slobodan Milošević), became the most important political struggle in Yugoslavia. Poor economic performance, and rising clashes between the various epublics, created a fertile soil for the rise of secessionist ideas among Slovenes, both anti-Communists and Communists. On 27 of September 1989 the Slovenian Assembly made many amendments to the 1974 constitution including the abandonment of the League of Communists monopoly on political power in Slovenia and the reassertion of Slovenia's right to leave Yugoslavia.

In an action named "Action North" in 1989, Slovene police forces, members of which later organized their own veteran organization, prevented several hundred Milošević supporters from meeting in Ljubljana on 1 December at a so-called Rally of Truth, with an attempt to overthrow Slovenian leadership because of its opposition to Serb centralist policy. The action can be considered the first defense action for Slovenian independence.

On 23 January 1990, the League of Communists of Slovenia, in protest against the domination of the Serb nationalist leadership, walked out of the 14th Congress of the League of Communists of Yugoslavia which effectively ceased to exist as a national party – they were followed soon after in formal withdrawal from the federal League of Communists by the League of Communists of Croatia.

In September 1989, numerous constitutional amendments were passed by the Assembly, which introduced parliamentary democracy to Slovenia. On 7 March 1990, the Slovenian Assembly passed the amendment XCI changing the official name of the state to the Republic of Slovenia dropping the word 'Socialist'. The new name has been official since 8 March 1990.

== Republic of Slovenia ==
=== Free elections ===
On 30 December 1989 Slovenia officially opened the spring 1990 elections to opposition parties thus inaugurating multi-party democracy. The Democratic Opposition of Slovenia (DEMOS) coalition of democratic political parties was created by an agreement between the Slovenian Democratic Union, the Social Democrat Alliance of Slovenia, the Slovene Christian Democrats, the Farmers' Alliance and the Greens of Slovenia. The leader of the coalition was the well-known dissident Jože Pučnik.

On 7 March 1990, the Slovenian Assembly changed the official name of the state to the "Republic of Slovenia".

On 8 April 1990, the first free multiparty parliamentary elections, and the first round of the presidential elections, were held. DEMOS defeated the former Communist party in the parliamentary elections, by gathering 54% of the votes. A coalition government led by the Christian Democrat Lojze Peterle was formed, and began economic and political reforms that established a market economy and a liberal democratic political system. At the same time, the government pursued the independence of Slovenia from Yugoslavia.

Milan Kučan was elected president in the second round of the presidential elections on 22 April 1990, defeating the DEMOS candidate Jože Pučnik. On 23 December 1990, more than 88% of the electorate voted for a sovereign and independent Slovenia. On 25 June 1991, Slovenia became independent.

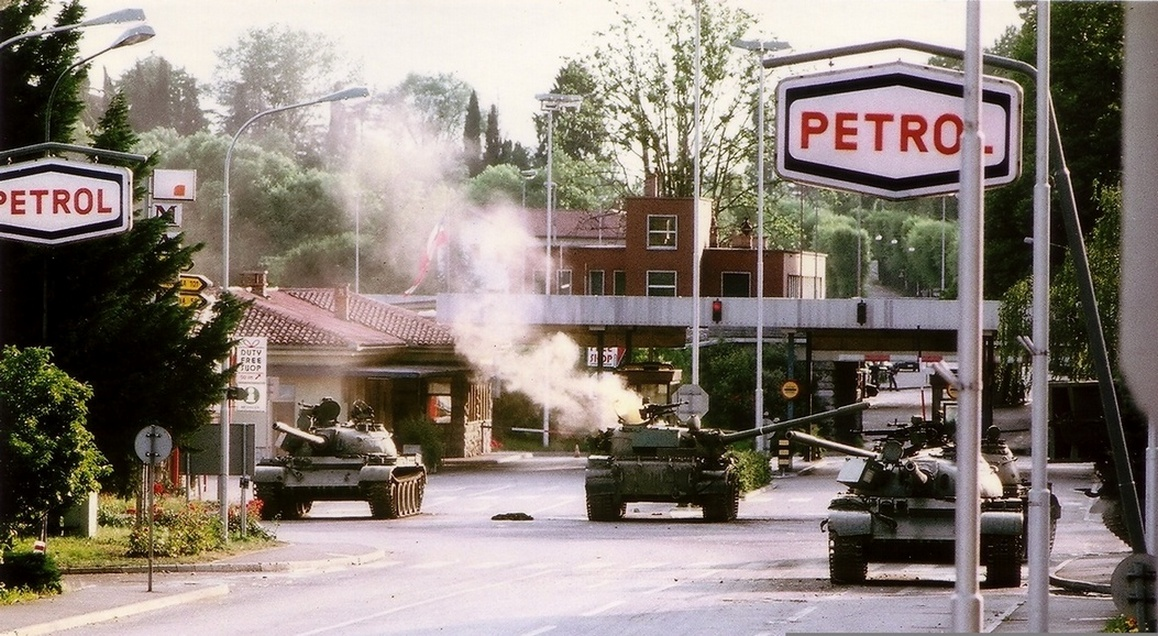
Slovenian Territorial Defense Units counterattacking a Yugoslav People's Army tank which entered Slovenia during the Ten-Day War, 1991

=== Kučan presidency (1990–2002) ===
==== The DEMOS government (1990–1992): Independence ====
Milan Kučan strongly opposed the preservation of Yugoslavia through violent means. After the concept of a loose confederation failed to gain support by the republics of Yugoslavia, Kučan favoured a controlled process of non-violent disassociation that would enable the collaboration of the former Yugoslav nations on a new, different basis.

On 23 December 1990, a referendum on the independence of Slovenia was held, in which more than 88% of Slovenian residents voted for the independence of Slovenia from Yugoslavia. Slovenia became independent through the passage of the appropriate acts on 25 June 1991. In the morning of the next day, a short Ten-Day War began, in which the Slovenian forces successfully rejected Yugoslav military interference. In the evening, the independence was solemnly proclaimed in Ljubljana by the Speaker of the Parliament France Bučar. The Ten-Day War lasted till 7 July 1991, when the Brijuni Agreement was made, with the European Community as a mediator, and the Yugoslav National Army started its withdrawal from Slovenia. On 26 October 1991, the last Yugoslav soldier left Slovenia.

On 23 December 1991 the Assembly of the Republic of Slovenia passed a new Constitution, which became the first Constitution of independent Slovenia.

Milan Kučan

Kučan represented Slovenia at the peace conference on former Yugoslavia in the Hague and Brussels which concluded that the former Yugoslav nations were free to determine their future as independent states. On May 22, 1992 Kučan represented Slovenia as it became a new member of the United Nations.

The most important achievement of the Coalition, however, was the declaration of independence of Slovenia on 25 June 1991, followed by a Ten-Day War in which the Slovenians rejected Yugoslav military interference. As a result of internal disagreements the coalition fell apart in 1992. It was officially dissolved in April 1992 in agreement with all the parties that had composed it. Following the collapse of Lojze Peterle's government, a new coalition government, led by Janez Drnovšek was formed, which included several parties of the former DEMOS. Jože Pučnik became vice-president in Drnovšek's cabinet, guaranteeing some continuity in the government policies.

The first country to recognise Slovenia as an independent country was Croatia on 26 June 1991. In the second half of 1991, some of the countries formed after the collapse of the Soviet Union recognized Slovenia. These were the Baltic countries Lithuania, Latvia, and Estonia, and Georgia, Ukraine, and Belarus. On 19 December 1991, Iceland and Sweden recognised Slovenia, and Germany passed a resolution on the recognition of Slovenia, realised alongside the European Economic Community (EEC) on 15 January 1992.

On 13, respectively 14 January 1992, the Holy See and San Marino recognised Slovenia. The first transmarine countries to recognise Slovenia were Canada and Australia on the 15, respectively 16 January 1992. The United States was at first very reserved towards the Slovenian independence and recognised Slovenia only on 7 April 1992.

The recognition by the EEC was particularly significant for Slovenia, as in December 1991 the EEC passed criteria for the international recognition of newly founded countries, which included democracy, the respect for human rights, the government of law, and the respect for the national minority rights. The recognition of Slovenia therefore indirectly also meant that Slovenia had been meeting the passed criteria.

In December 1992, after the independence and the international recognition of Slovenia, Kučan was elected as the first president of Slovenia in the 1992 presidential election, with the support of the citizens list. He won another five-year term in the 1997 election, running again as an independent and again winning the majority in the first round.

==== Drnovšek premiership (1992–2002): Re-orientation of Slovenia's trade ====
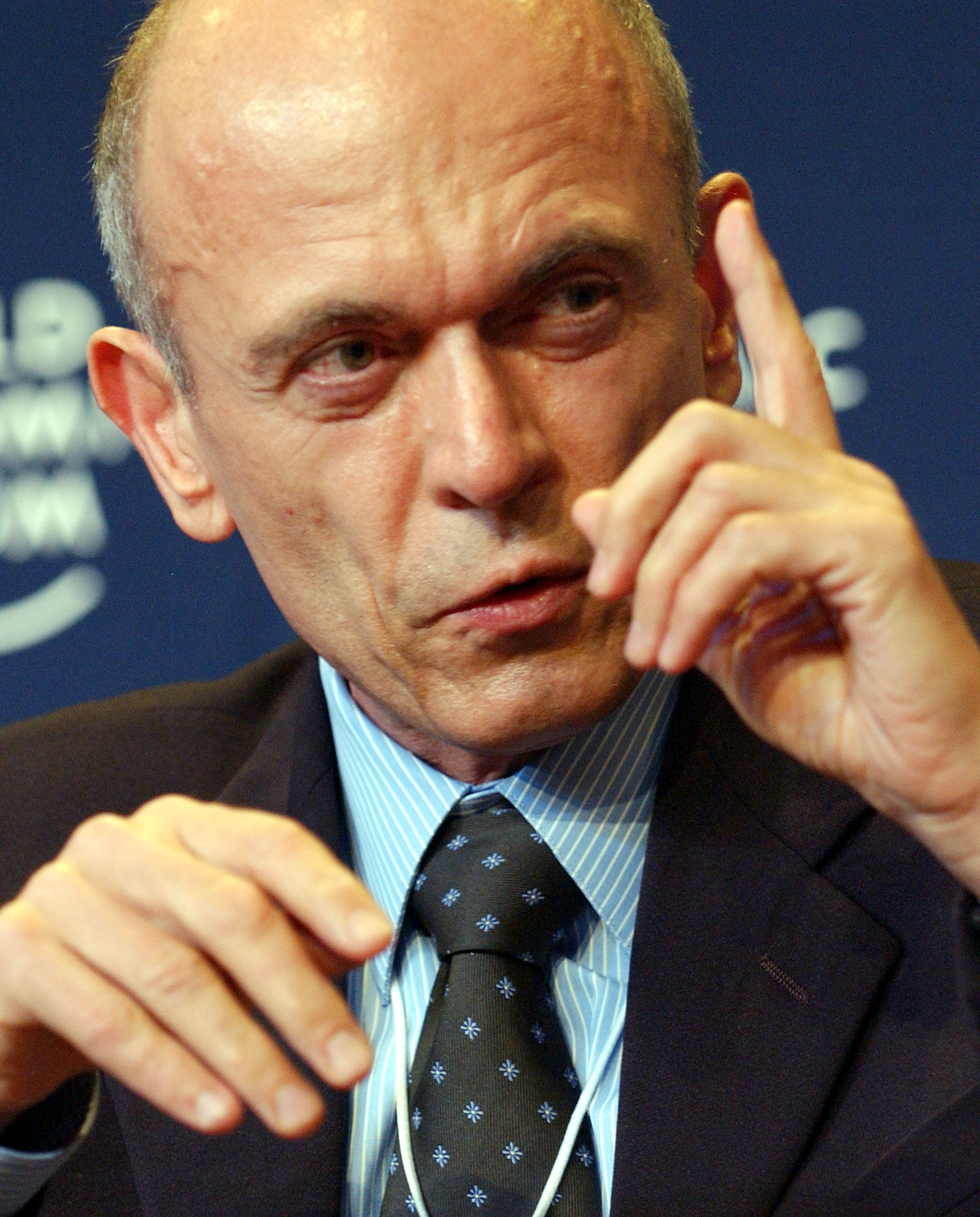
Janez Drnovšek, Prime Minister of Slovenia between 1992 and 2002, and president of Slovenia between 2002 and 2007

Janez Drnovšek was the second Prime Minister of independent Slovenia. He was chosen as a compromise candidate and an expert in economic policy, transcending ideological and programmatic divisions between parties. Drnovšek's governments reoriented Slovenia's trade away from Yugoslavia towards the West and contrary to some other former Communist countries in Eastern Europe, the economic and social transformation followed a gradualist approach. After six months in opposition from May 2000 to Autumn 2000, Drnovšek returned to power again and helped to arrange the first meeting between George W. Bush and Vladimir Putin (Bush-Putin 2001).

=== Drnovšek presidency (2002–2007); EU and NATO membership ===
Drnovšek held the position of the president from 2002 to 2007. During the term, in March 2003, Slovenia held two referendums on joining the EU and NATO. Slovenia joined NATO on 29 March 2004. and the European Union on 1 May 2004. On 1 January 2007 Slovenia joined the Eurozone and adopted the euro as its currency.

==== Janša premiership (2004–2008): Unsustainable growth ====
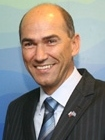
Janez Janša

Janez Janša was Prime Minister of Slovenia from November 2004 to November 2008 for the first time. During the term characterized by over-enthusiasm after joining EU, between 2005 and 2008 the Slovenian banks have seen loan-deposit ratio veering out of control, over-borrowing from foreign banks and then over-crediting private sector, leading to its unsustainable growth.

=== Türk presidency (2007–2012) ===
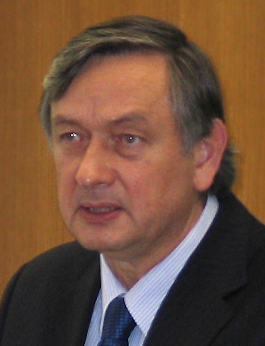
Danilo Türk

Danilo Türk held the position of the president from 2007 to 2012.

==== Pahor premiership (2008–2012): Blocked reforms ====
Borut Pahor was Prime Minister of Slovenia from November 2008 until February 2012. Faced by the global economic crisis his government proposed economic reforms, but they were rejected by the opposition leader Janez Janša and blocked by referendums in 2011. On the other hand, the voters voted in favour of an arbitration agreement with Croatia, aimed to solve the border dispute between the countries, emerging after the breakup of Yugoslavia. In 2010, Slovenia joined the OECD.

=== Pahor presidency (2012-2022) ===
Pahor has held the position of president since 2012. In November 2017, Slovenian President Borut Pahor was re-elected for a second term in close election.

==== Janša premiership (2012–2013): Anti-corruption report ====
Janša was Prime Minister of Slovenia from February 2012 until March 2013 for the second time. He was replaced by the first female PM in history of Slovenia, Alenka Bratušek, after the official anti-corruption agency's Report on the Parliamentary Parties' Leaders was issued. Former prime minister Janez Janša spent six months in prison in 2014 after being convicted on bribery charges related to a 2006 arms deal. Janša had denied any wrongdoing.

Miro Cerar was prime minister since September 2014 until March 2018. His government coalition included Cerar's Party of Modern Centre, the Social Democrats and pensioners’ party DeSUS.

In June 2018, the center-right Slovenia Democratic Party (SDS) of former prime minister Janez Janša won in the election. SDS secured 25 seats in the 90-seat parliament. A center-left party, The List of Marjan Šarec (LMŠ), was in second place with 13 seats. Cerar's Party of The Modern Centre was fourth with just 10 seats.

In August 2018, new prime minister Marjan Šarec formed a minority government made up of five center-left parties.

In January 2020, prime minister Šarec resigned because his minority government was too weak to push through important legislation.

==== Janša premiership (2020-2022) ====
In March 2020, Janez Janša became prime minister for third time in the new coalition government of SDS, the Modern Centre Party (SMC), New Slovenia (NSi) and Pensioners' Party (DeSUS). Janša had previously been prime minister from 2004 to 2008 and from 2012 to 2013. Janez Janša was known as a right-wing populist and an outspoken supporter of former US President Donald Trump. Janša was also known as an ally of right-wing Prime Minister Viktor Orban of Hungary.

==== Golob premiership (2022-2026) ====
In April 2022, liberal opposition, The Freedom Movement, won the parliamentary election. The Freedom Movement won 34.5% of the vote, compared with 23.6% for Janša’s Slovenian Democratic party. On 25 May 2022, Slovenia’s parliament voted to appoint the leader of Freedom Movement, Robert Golob, as the new Prime Minister of Slovenia to succeed Janez Janša.

In November 2022, Natasa Pirc Musar, liberal candidate and lawyer, won the second round of Slovenia's presidential election, becoming Slovenia's first female president.

=== Pirc Musar presidency (2022-) ===
On 23 December 2022, Nataša Pirc Musar became Slovenia’s fifth president to succeed her predecessor Borut Pahor.

On 22 March 2026, the ruling centre-left coalition lost its majority in the parliamentary election. On May 22, Janez Janša was elected as prime minister of a new centre-right government by the Slovenia’s parliament.

== See also ==
- Breakup of Yugoslavia
- Divje Babe flute
- Habsburg monarchy
- History of the Balkans
- History of Europe
- History of Austria, History of Italy, History of Hungary, History of Croatia, History of Yugoslavia
- History of the Jews in Slovenia
- League of Communists of Yugoslavia
- List of presidents of Slovenia
- List of heads of state of Yugoslavia
- List of prime ministers of Yugoslavia
- Politics of Slovenia
- Prime Minister of Slovenia
- Ten-Day War
- Timeline of Slovenian history
- Republic of Prekmurje
- Slovene March (Kingdom of Hungary)
