= Franjo Malgaj =

Slovenian military leader and poet

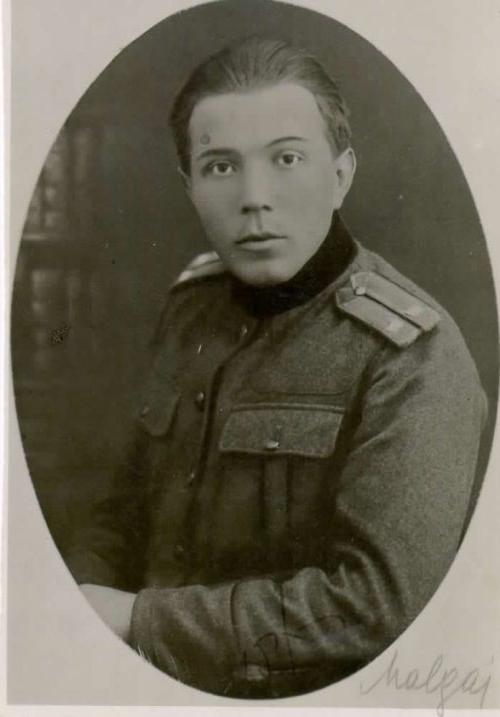
- Franjo Malgaj in 1918 or 1919 wearing a Kingdom of SHS uniform
- Born: November 10, 1894; Hruševec, Šentjur, Austro-Hungarian Empire (now Slovenia)
- Died: May 6, 1919 (aged 24); Tolsti Vrh near Dravograd in Carinthia
- Military career
- Allegiance: Austria-Hungary; Kingdom of Serbs, Croats and Slovenes
- Units: 87th Infantry regiment (Austria-Hungary) "Maister's fighters"
- Conflicts: World War I Austro-Slovene conflict in Carinthia

Franjo Malgaj (November 10, 1894 – May 6, 1919) was a Slovenian soldier, military leader and poet. He was an officer of the Austro-Hungarian Army. After the dissolution of the Austro-Hungarian Empire after World War I, he became one of the commanding officers in the Slovene volunteer army under Rudolf Maister's command that fought against German Austrian units during the struggle for the northern Slovenian borderlands. He later became an officer in the Army of Kingdom of Serbs, Croats and Slovenes. He died during the Austrian-Yugoslav struggles in 1919. He is considered a Slovenian national hero.

== Education and military career ==
He was born in Hruševec near the Lower Styrian town of Šentjur, in what was then the Austro-Hungarian Empire (now in Slovenia). After finishing the elementary school in the nearby Styrian town of Celje, he enrolled in the Celje First Grammar School. He later studied in the Carniolan town of Kranj and in Pazin (Istria).

After graduating from the school for infantry reserve officers in Graz, he participated in the Italian campaign during World War I. He participated in the first and second battles of the Isonzo, where he contracted Typhoid fever. After recovering, he was transferred to the Tyrolean sector of the front. For his bold attacks on the Italian stronghold on Monte Zebio he received the Golden Medal and transferred to the 87th Infantry regiment in Celje. In October 1918, he started to study law at the University of Graz.

== Slovenian military leader ==
After the dissolution of the Austro-Hungarian Empire and the establishment of the State of Slovenes, Croats and Serbs in late October 1918, he joined the Slovene volunteer army established by Rudolf Maister. This army, known as "Maister's fighters" (Slovene: Maistrovi borci), seized the Slovene-inhabited territories in Lower Styria, and fought against the forces of the German Austria for the border areas in Styria and Carinthia.

In early November, Malgaj gathered a group of Slovene volunteers around Celje and marched into southeast Carinthia (in what is now known as Slovenian Carinthia). Together with General Maister and a company of volunteers composed of soldiers of the Army of the Kingdom of Serbia that were retreating from imprisonment in Austria, he reached Lavamünd and captured the Carinthian town of Völkermarkt (Slovene: Velikovec) in late November 1918.

== Death ==
Accounts vary regarding his death. He either committed suicide on May 6, 1919, at Tolsti Vrh near Dravograd in Carinthia after being surrounded by Austrian soldiers, or he died after he accidentally activated a hand grenade attached to his belt. Unconfirmed rumors suggest he was shot by a group of soldiers from Serbia with whom he was allegedly in conflict.

He was buried in the Carinthian town of Guštanj (now Ravne na Koroškem).

== Legacy ==
On the 90th anniversary of Malgaj's death, his memoirs from 1914 to 1919 were published. A primary school in Šentjur was named after him. Malgaj is well known in Slovenia because he led the group of Maister's soldiers that captured Meža and the Meža Valley for Slovenia after the First World War.
