= Hruševec, Šentjur =

Hruševec
- Location in Slovenia
- Coordinates: 46°12′28.85″N 15°22′47.43″E
- Country: Slovenia
- Traditional region: Styria
- Statistical region: Savinja
- Municipality: Šentjur

Area
  - Total: 0.32 km^{2} (0.12 sq mi)
- Elevation: 304.5 m (999 ft)

Population (2020)
  - Total: 33
  - Density: 100/km^{2} (270/sq mi)

Hruševec (pronounced [ˈxɾuːʃɛʋəts]) is a small settlement on the left bank of the Voglajna River in the Municipality of Šentjur, in eastern Slovenia. The settlement, and the entire municipality, are included in the Savinja Statistical Region, which is in the Slovenian portion of the historical Duchy of Styria.

== Notable people ==
Notable people that were born or lived in Hruševec include:

- Franjo Malgaj (1894–1919), First World War officer
