= Tolsti Vrh pri Ravnah na Koroškem, Dravograd =

Tolsti Vrh pri Ravnah na Koroškem
- Location in Slovenia
- Coordinates: 46°34′27.78″N 15°0′3.81″E
- Country: Slovenia
- Traditional region: Carinthia
- Statistical region: Carinthia
- Municipality: Dravograd

Area
  - Total: 1.61 km^{2} (0.62 sq mi)
- Elevation: 636.5 m (2,088 ft)

Population (2002)
  - Total: 77
- The data on this page refer only to the part of the settlement in the Municipality of Dravograd

Tolsti Vrh pri Ravnah na Koroškem (pronounced [ˈtɔːʍsti ˈʋəɾx pɾi ˈɾáːwnax na kɔˈɾóːʃkɛm]) is a settlement in the Carinthia region in northern Slovenia. A small part of it is in the Municipality of Dravograd, and the larger part is in the neighboring Municipality of Ravne na Koroškem.
