= Austro-Slovene conflict in Carinthia =

1918-1919 military conflict between Austria and Yugoslavia

- Part of the aftermath of World War I and the creation of Yugoslavia
Date	23 November 1918 – 31 July 1919
Location	Carinthia and partly in Styria
Result	Ceasefire: In Carinthian plebiscite southeastern Carinthia votes in favour of joining Austria.; Territorial changes are coordinated by Treaty of Saint-Germain-en-Laye.
Territorial changes	Majority of southeastern Carinthia is ceded to Austria. Maribor, Meža Valley and Jezersko are ceded to Kingdom of Serbs, Croats and Slovenes.

Belligerents
State of Slovenes, Croats and Serbs: Maister's fighters	Republic of German-Austria: Carinthia (Provisional state government of Carinthia)
After unification with Kingdom of Serbia on 1 December 1918: Kingdom of Serbs, Croats and Slovenes: Units from Lower Styria; Units from Ljubljana	Republic of German-Austria: Carinthia (Provisional state government of Carinthia)
After 13 February ceasefire: (Kingdom of Yugoslavia) Army of the Kingdom of Serbs, Croats and Slovenes	Republic of German-Austria: Carinthia (Provisional state government of Carinthia)

Commanders and leaders
(Kingdom of Yugoslavia) Rudolf Maister (Kingdom of Yugoslavia) Franjo Malgaj † (Kingdom of Yugoslavia) Alfred Lavrič; After April German-Austrian counter-offensive also: (Kingdom of Yugoslavia) Vladimir Uzorinac (Kingdom of Yugoslavia) Ljubomir Marić (Kingdom of Yugoslavia) Dobrosav Milenkov (Kingdom of Yugoslavia) Sava Tripkov	(Carinthia) Arthur Lemisch (Carinthia) Ludwig Hülgerth (Carinthia) Hans Steinacher

Units involved
(Kingdom of Yugoslavia) Maister's fighters: Serb volunteers	(Carinthia) People's Defence (Volkswehr) (Carinthia) "Green Guard" (Schutzwehr)

Strength
4,000-12,000 (At its peak)	8,000-10,000 (At its peak)

Casualties and losses
150–300 killed	300–700 killed

The Austro-Slovene conflict in Carinthia was a military engagement that ensued in the aftermath of World War I between forces loyal to the State of Slovenes, Croats and Serbs and later the Kingdom of Serbs, Croats and Slovenes, and forces loyal to the Republic of German-Austria. The main theater of the conflict was the linguistically mixed region in southeastern Carinthia. The conflict was settled by the 1919 Treaty of Saint-Germain, under which a 1920 plebiscite in the disputed territory assigned it to the First Austrian Republic.

Many Slovene-speaking people were in favour of joining the newly formed Kingdom of Serbs, Croats and Slovenes (later Yugoslavia), while the German speaking people and also a large part of Slovenes were loyal to the newly proclaimed Republic of German Austria (Deutsch-Österreich). The disputed territory was earlier on a part of the Duchy of Carinthia within the Holy Roman Empire from year 976, and had belonged to the Habsburg monarchy since year 1335. At the centre of conflict was the position of the border that separated the two new states. In German-language historiography, the conflict is known as the Kärntner Abwehrkampf ("Carinthian defensive struggle"), while in Slovene-language historiography, the conflict is known as the Boj za severno mejo ("Struggle for the northern border").

== Background ==
Slovene-speaking regions were integrated into several Austrian states throughout much of the 2nd millennium. The idea of South Slavic–speaking territories creating a new state of their own had been one of the key issues debated among Slovene intelligentsia throughout the second part of the 19th century, especially in the aftermath of the spring of nations. As a consequence of Austro-Hungarian invasion of the Kingdom of Serbia the Yugoslav committee was formed, with its goal being the unification of South Slavic lands known as Yugoslavia. In 1916 the Serbian parliament in exile voted in favour of creating a Kingdom of Yugoslavia as a plan of post-world war governance of the Balkan Peninsula.

=== Creation of the State of Slovenes, Croats and Serbs ===
As a consequence of the World War, the Austro-Hungarian Empire began to dissolve even before the war officially ended. In the period between 5–8 October 1918 a pro-Yugoslav National Council of Slovenes, Croats and Serbs took control over the regional administration in Zagreb. On 29 October the National Council declared the formation of a Yugoslav state, following a rejection of a plan of greater autonomy within Austria-Hungary.

The Entente powers did not recognise the newly found state before it merged with the Kingdom of Serbia three days later, in an effort to create a stable and recognised country of all South Slavs, as well as discouraging Italy from conquering Slovenian-settled territory not allocated as war reparations to Italy in the Treaty of London.

=== Territorial claims ===
No formal border was yet recognised between the newly created entities, with both sides claiming that they were in control of the area along the ethnically mixed communities. The National Government in Ljubljana did not pay particular attention to the border issue, as it was planning on gaining much territory through negotiations at the peace conference.

== Escalation ==
=== Mobilization ===
The National Council for Styria (Slovene: Narodni svet za Štajersko) gave permission to Rudolf Maister, a veteran of the World War and a former officer of Austria-Hungary to take control of the military branch in Maribor. He also gained the rank of a General, and was given authority over all military forces located in Styria under the control of the Kingdom of SHS. On 31 October, Rudolf Maister announced his disagreement with the municipal declaration of Maribor in front of an audience of Lieutenant Colonel Anton Holik and his officers at the Melj military barracks of the 26th infantry regiment. On 9 November Maister announced full mobilization of Lower Styria, which both the German-Austrian government and the authorities in Ljubljana disagreed with. The mobilization decree was successful as the armed forces grew to about 4,000 fighters, and establishing a new infantry regiment in Maribor by 21 November.

=== Military movements begin ===
First Lieutenant Franjo Malgaj and his unit entered Carinthia on 6 November. Captain Alfred Lavrič's unit was designated to be in charge of capturing Carinthia, and began taking control of the territory on 13 November, when his units entered the Jaun Valley (German: Jauntal, Slovene: Podjuna) and Ferlach (Slovene: Borovlje). The Loibl Pass (German: Loiblpass, Slovene: prelaz Ljubelj) was captured the following day.

Maister's fighters in Carinthia in 1919. The Slovene national flag is seen in the background

On 23 November Maister's fighters began to seize control of guard posts throughout the Maribor region by disarming the local guardsmen under the control of the Maribor municipality. Captain Rudolf Knez entered Sittersdorf (Žitara vas) and settled his units there. From 27 November onward, the Slovene fighters, under the direct command of Maister, took control of Spielfeld (Špilje), Bad Radkersburg (Radgona), Mureck (Cmurek), Leutschach (Lučane), Radlje ob Dravi (Marenberg), and Muta (Hohenmauthen), while the units from Celje (Cilli) under the command of Franjo Malgaj took control of the Meža Valley (Mießtal), Bleiburg (Pliberk), where Serb volunteers returning from the Eastern front of World War I also joined Malgaj's unit. All the areas captured were agreed upon by General Rudolf Passy of Carinthia and General Maister on 27 November. The agreement included permission to take control of all Slovene-majority settlements, but remained unsupported and criticized by Styrian, Carinthian, and German-Austrian authorities, as well as the National council in Ljubljana. Units from Ljubljana took control of Dravograd (Unterdrauburg), Lavamünd (Labot) and Sankt Paul (Šentpavel). The capture of Völkermarkt (Velikovec) on 30 November sparked much criticism, as it was allegedly not included in the demarcation line plans.

=== Armed conflicts ===
Result of a clash between Austrian Carinthian units and Maister's fighters on the northern side of the Karawanks Tunnel

First armed clashes already occurred under command of Malgaj during the attack on Bleiburg, but it was not until the battle in Lučane when violent confrontations became apparent. Following minor fights between the two militias, a larger battle occurred on 4 February near Radgona. Plans were set by Maister to attack and capture Klagenfurt (Celovec) but were abandoned following negotiations. On 13 February a peace treaty was signed by both parties.

On Sunday, 27 January 1919, Maister's forces clashed with German protesters in Maribor, resulting in several civilian deaths.

== Battle of Lučane ==
=== Background ===
In late November and early December, the military units of the Maribor Infantry Regiment occupied large areas along the Slovenian national border, including Leutschach (Lučane). The Styrian regional government complained about the occupation and on 14 January attacked the Lučane. This was the first major clash between the two sides.

=== The battle ===
On 14 January at 4am Austrian Forces under the command of captain Pichler attacked Lučane. The town was guarded by Slovenian forces under the command of General Maister. The Austrian side had much better equipment and more men than the Slovenian one. Austrian side had 180 soldiers meanwhile the Slovenian one 92. Slovenian forces still managed to repulse the attack and kept the control of the town. There wasn't a big amount of casualties on both sides and the captain Pichler was later arrested.

== Battle of Radgona ==
=== Background ===
In February, 1919 the town of Radgona was defended by 6th corps of the Maister's fighters under the command of a Slovene commander Benedikt Zeilhofer. On 4 February at 2am the town was attacked by an overwhelming force from Austria and some Hungarian volunteers under the command of Johan Mickl. The Slovenian side had 210 soldiers and the Austrian around 2000.

=== The battle ===
The Austro-Hungarian army divided its 2000 soldiers into five columns. Each column had a special attack group, which numbered at least 50 soldiers and several machine guns. These alone, almost 300 volunteer shock troops, already exceeded the total strength of the Slovenian defenders. Under the cover of darkness, all the enemy columns noiselessly approached the defenders, according to the plan, and waited for the signal for a joint coordinated attack in several places at the same time. The combat group, assigned for the attack on the cavalry barracks, where the majority of the defenders were, was personally commanded by Lieutenant Mickl.

The attack began at half past 6am, on 4 February 1919. In the first onslaught by the Germans, counting on surprise, the exposed Slovenian guards covered before the enormous superiority of the enemies, who suddenly appeared out of the darkness. Mickle's soldiers captured the western part of Radgona, west of Long Street. The attackers succeeded in attacking the Slovene advance guards at the station, in the city garden and on the bridges over the Mura River. The attack on the station command, the Kodolič bridge and the cavalry barracks, in which most of the Slovenian defenders were stationed, failed.

The attackers immediately encountered two Slovenian commanders - the commander of the 6th company, Benedikt Zeilhofer, and staff sergeant Ferd Ošlak, the patrol commander. Lieutenant Zeilhofer was inspecting all the guards in the suburbs and at the station for the second time that night before the attack began, and at the time of the attack he was next to the guard post in the cavalry barracks, next to the machine gun nest. When the light flares lit up the dark, snowy night, despite the temperature being -20 degrees celsius, it immediately became hot.

Immediately upon the attack, a soldier machinist was hit and Lieutenant Zeilhofer jumped and grabbed the machine gun and started shooting at the attackers. Thus, he prevented the first planned attack of the enemy troops to jump in and throw hand grenades at the barracks. While changing position, it also hit the Lt. Zeilhofer. Slovenian defenders immediately pulled him to safety and bandaged his wound in the abdomen and right side. Then he was placed on a haystack from where he commanded until the end of the battle and led the fight to the final victory of the Slovene forces. The battle costed high casualties on both sides.

== Graz–Ljubljana Protocol ==
With the occupation of southeastern Carinthia by Yugoslav troops, and the confrontation evolving into armed clashes, the provisional Carinthian government under Governor Arthur Lemisch decided to lead off the armed struggle in order to preserve the southern Carinthian border on the Karawanken. Bitter fighting of paramilitary groups around Arnoldstein and Ferlach alarmed the Entente powers. They arbitrated a ceasefire, whereafter a nine-day U.S. Army commission under Lt. Col. Sherman Miles surveyed the disputed region between river and mountains in January and February 1919 and made the crucial recommendation that the Karawanken frontier should be retained, thus opening the possibility of a plebiscite. Yugoslav representatives urged for a border on the Drava; American delegates however spoke in favour of preserving the unity of the Klagenfurt Basin and convinced the British and French delegations to support their plan of plebiscite for the entire Klagenfurt region.

== Yugoslav offensive and Austrian counter-offensive ==
On 29 April, after months of relative peace, Yugoslav troops breached the ceasefire agreement. Armed clashes occurred throughout the region, with noticeable territorial gains achieved by the Kingdom of Serbs, Croats and Slovenes. The Yugoslav troops experienced much resistance in the following days, as Austrian troops already carried out effective counter-offensive actions. The situation for the Slovenes worsened, and on 2 May Carinthian units had already taken control of Völkermarkt. Two days later Austrian counter-offensive reached the Gallizien (Slovene: Galicija)-Abtei (Apače)-Sankt Margareten im Rosental (Šmarjeta) line. After two days of fierce fighting the Austrian units successfully breached the line and in the process destroyed the 3rd infantry battalion from Ljubljana.

The remaining Slovene units continued to retreat back into Lower Styria, while almost all of the Carinthian area that was gained during the winter clashes was lost to the advancing Austrian units. The last to fall was Dravograd (Unterdrauburg) before the Royal Yugoslav Army's 36th infantry regiment under control of Lt.Col. Vladimir Uzorinac managed to hold ground in Guštanj (Gutenstein) and therefore stop the counter-offensive. General Maister sent two units of his Maribor infantry regiment to aid the troops holding ground near Slovenj Gradec (Windischgraz). Officer Malgaj, one of the key leaders of the Slovene fighters in Carinthia, was killed on 6 May.

== Second Yugoslav offensive ==
After a military defeat in the April offensive, authorities in Ljubljana mobilised all their forces and drafted regiments from Serbia to regain lost territory. On 26 May a new offensive was authorised which lasted throughout May and until 6 June, during which they managed to capture much of the Klagenfurt region to as far north as Maria Saal (Gospa Sveta). The offensive was considered a military success.

== Aftermath ==
The Paris peace conference turned the tide, when an order was given to the Yugoslavs to completely retreat from the northern B zone of the Klagenfurt Basin area in a time frame set to end on 31 July, at the latest, to enable the commission to carry out the planned plebiscite.

The Treaty of Saint-Germain with the Republic of Austria, signed on 10 September 1919, should have determined the Austrian-Yugoslav border. It ascertained that some small parts of Carinthia, the Meža Valley with the town of Dravograd and the Jezersko municipal area, would be incorporated into the new Kingdom of Serbs, Croats and Slovenes while the fate of wider southeastern Carinthia area down to the Klagenfurt Basin was to be determined by a plebiscite.

The outcome of the plebiscite held on 10 October 1920, was 22,025 votes (59.1% of the total cast) for adhesion to Austria and 15,279 (40.9%) for annexation by the Kingdom of the Serbs, Croats, and Slovenes.

While a majority in the remote Alpine villages on the slopes of the Karawanks voted for Yugoslavia, the inhabitants of the densely-settled Klagenfurt Basin were motivated by their evolved social, cultural and economic ties to the central Carinthian region.

The region was placed under Austrian administration on 18 November 1920 and declared part of the sovereign Austrian Republic on 22 November. Until today, 10 October is a public holiday in the State of Carinthia.

The plebiscite ultimately determined the border between Austria and the Kingdom of Serbs, Croats, and Slovenes. The border remained unchanged after World War II, even as the Kingdom of Yugoslavia gave way to Josip Broz Tito's Socialist Federal Republic of Yugoslavia, but at the end of the war, Yugoslav Partisans again briefly occupied the area, including the capital city of Klagenfurt. Since the disintegration of Yugoslavia, the border separates Austria and Slovenia.
