= Rudolf Maister =

Slovene military officer and poet

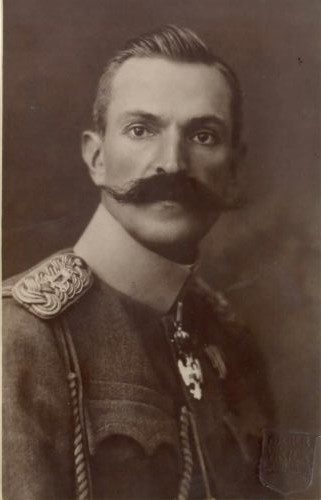
- Rudolf Maister in 1919
- Born: March 29, 1874; Stein, Duchy of Carniola, Austria-Hungary (now Kamnik, Slovenia)
- Died: July 26, 1934 (aged 60); Unec, Yugoslavia (now in Slovenia)
- Military career
- Allegiance: Austria-Hungary; State of Slovenes, Croats and Serbs; Kingdom of Serbs, Croats and Slovenes
- Service years: 1890–1923
- Rank: Divisional general
- Nickname: Vojanov
- Commands: Slovenian army Commander of Maribor
- Conflicts: World War I Austro-Slovene conflict in Carinthia
- Awards: Signum laudis Order of White Eagle; Order of Star of Karađorđe; Order of Saint Sava
- Other work: Poet and self-taught painter

Rudolf Maister (pen name: Vojanov; 29 March 1874 – 26 July 1934) was a Slovene military officer, poet and political activist. The soldiers who fought under Maister's command in northern Slovenia became known as "Maister's fighters" (Slovene: Maistrovi borci). Maister was also an accomplished poet and self-taught painter.

== Life ==
=== Early career and fight for Styria ===
Maister was born in the Upper Carniolan commercial town of Kamnik, then part of Austria-Hungary. He came from a German-speaking family. Letters from his youth have been preserved in which he expressed his rejection of Slavs and Jews, but eventually he turned to the Slovene national cause. A career soldier, during World War I, he served in the Austro-Hungarian Army. In 1917, he was sent to Graz promoted to the rank of a major. In 1918, near the end of the war when it was obvious that Austria-Hungary was losing, the city council of Marburg, then German-speaking by large majority, proclaimed the town part of German-Austria. Maister organized Slovene volunteer forces of 4000 soldiers and 200 officers and in the night of 23 November 1918 seized control of the city of Maribor and the surrounding region of Lower Styria. This date has been recognized as a state holiday in Slovenia since 2005. The Slovene National Council for Lower Styria awarded him the rank of general on November 1. The German-speaking city was thus secured for the newly formed State of Slovenes, Croats and Serbs, which united with the Kingdom of Serbia into the Kingdom of Serbs, Croats and Slovenes on December 1. Maister's rank as a general was confirmed by the National Government of the Slovene part of the Kingdom as a "lieutenant with the title and character of a general" on 11 December 1918, which was later also confirmed by the Belgrade Government. On 14 January he commanded Slovenian forces in the Battle of Lučane.

=== Marburg's Bloody Sunday ===
On 27 January 1919, Germans awaiting the American peace delegation at the marketplace in Maribor (German: Marburg) were fired on by Slovenian troops under the command of Maister. Nine Germans were killed and more than eighteen were seriously wounded. The responsibility for the shooting has not been conclusively established. German sources accused Maister's troops of shooting without cause, while Slovenian witnesses, such as Maks Pohar, testified that the Germans (some still in the uniforms of the German paramilitary organization called the Green Guard) attacked the Slovene soldiers guarding the city hall. The Austrian Germans allegedly attacked the police inspector, Ivan Senekovič, and then pressed towards the Slovenian soldiers in front of the city hall. A Slovenian version of this event involves a German firing a revolver in the direction of the Slovenian soldiers, who responded spontaneously by firing into the civilian crowd. The event became known as Marburg's Bloody Sunday (German: Marburger Blutsonntag).

=== Fight for Carinthia ===
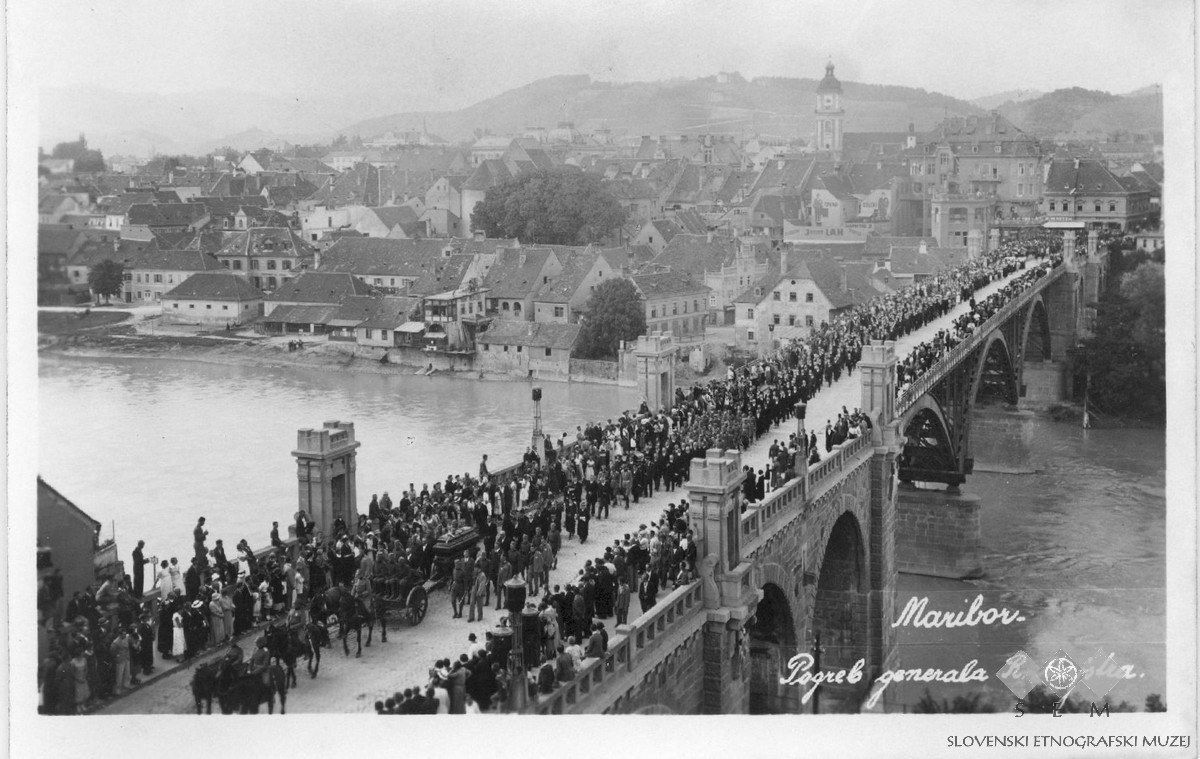
Rudolf Maister's funeral

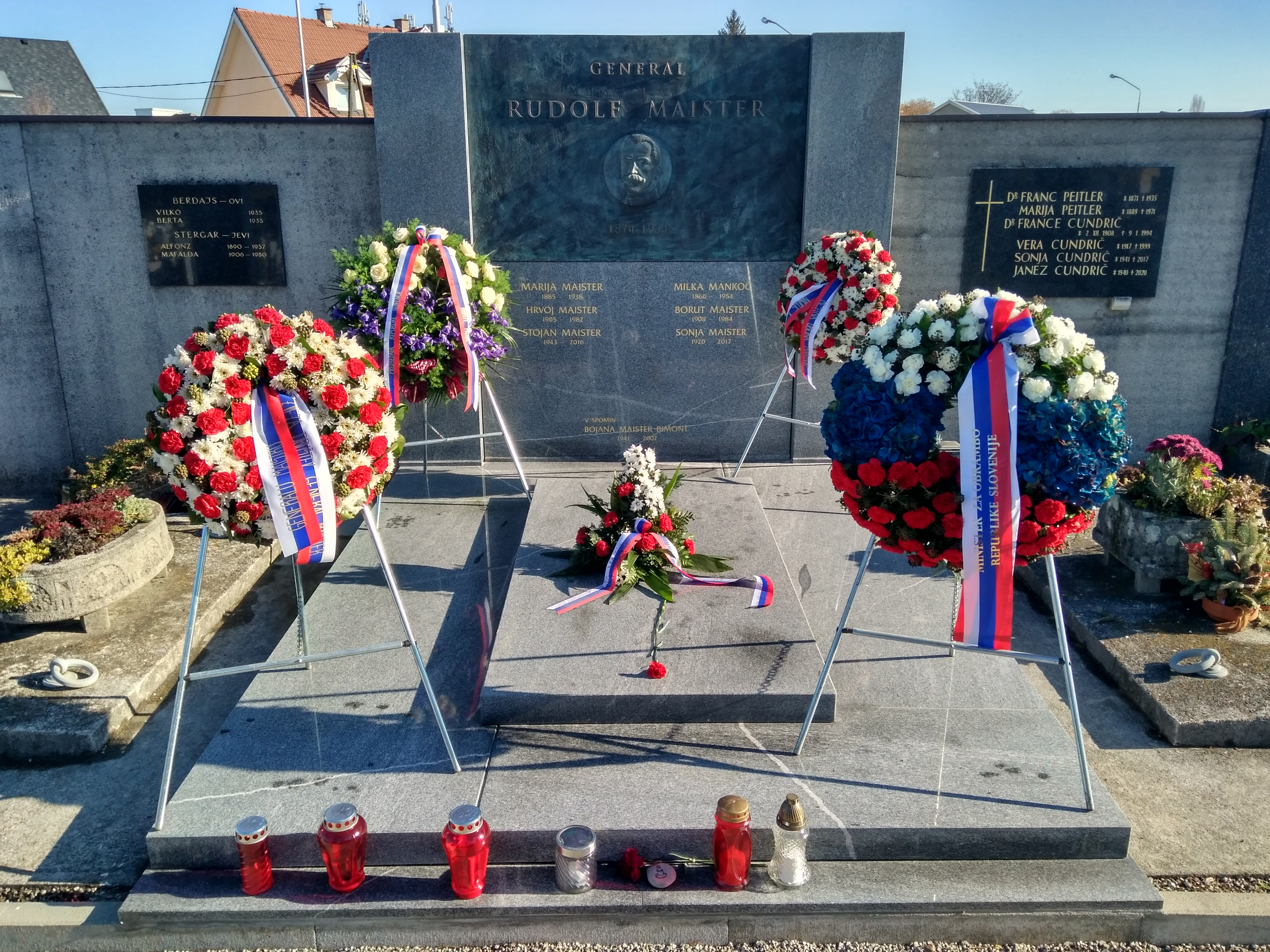
Rudolf Maister's grave in Pobrežje Cemetery in Maribor

In April 1919, Maister's forces joined the Kingdom of Serbs, Croats and Slovenes Army's offensive in Carinthia. Maister joined them later and took part of the capture of Klagenfurt. After the Carinthian Plebiscite, in which the majority of the local Slovenian population decided to remain part of Austria, Maister withdrew to private life. He spent most of his later life in an estate near Planina in Inner Carniola.

== Poetry ==
Maister also wrote poetry, which he published in two collected volumes in 1904 and in 1929. Most of his poetry follows Post-Romantic aesthetics, and it is influenced by the 19th-century Slovene lyrical and patriotic poetry of Simon Jenko, Simon Gregorčič, and Anton Aškerc.

== Legacy ==
In Ljubljana, the capital of Slovenia, an equestrian statue by Jakov Brdar has stood since 1999 opposite the entrance to the main train station at the corner of Liberation Front Square and Kolodvorska Street. In Maribor, a street and the square Trg Generala Maistra are named after him. A bronze statue has also been erected next to the high school. In his birthplace of Kamnik, a school center also bears his name (Šolski Center Rudolfa Maistra).

In the modern Slovene Armed Forces there are two decorations are named for Maister. The Order of General Maister is awarded in three grades for special merit during war time, exceptional command during war or peace time, and merit in the strengthening of the Slovenian Army. The Medal of General Maister is awarded in three grades for special merits or for important successes in performing military service or work in the defense field.
