= Preški Vrh =

- Location in Slovenia
- Coordinates: 46°31′26.71″N 14°58′4.14″E
- Country: Slovenia
- Traditional region: Carinthia
- Statistical region: Carinthia
- Municipality: Ravne na Koroškem

Area
  - Total: 2.62 km^{2} (1.01 sq mi)
- Elevation: 504.2 m (1,654 ft)

Population (2002)
  - Total: 175

Preški Vrh (pronounced [ˈpɾeːʃki ˈʋəɾx]) is a dispersed settlement in the hills south of Ravne na Koroškem in the Carinthia region in northern Slovenia.

The Slovene writer Prežihov Voranc lived in the settlement in his youth. Though he was born in neighbouring Podgora, he derived his pen name from the Prežih farm, which his father bought in 1911. The house is now a small museum and a bronze sculpture of the writer made by Stojan Batič was erected close by.
