= Uršlja Gora =

- Location in Slovenia
- Coordinates: 46°29′57.3″N 14°57′4.16″E
- Country: Slovenia
- Traditional region: Carinthia
- Statistical region: Carinthia
- Municipality: Ravne na Koroškem

Area
  - Total: 6.18 km^{2} (2.39 sq mi)
- Elevation: 949.5 m (3,115 ft)

Uršlja Gora (pronounced [ˈuːɾʃlja ˈɡɔːɾa]) is a dispersed settlement on the northern slopes of Mount St. Ursula southwest of Kotlje in the Municipality of Ravne na Koroškem in the Carinthia region in northern Slovenia. The local church from which the settlement and the mountain get their name is dedicated to Saint Ursula, but lies under the peak of the hill in the neighbouring settlement of Jazbina.
