= Dobja Vas =

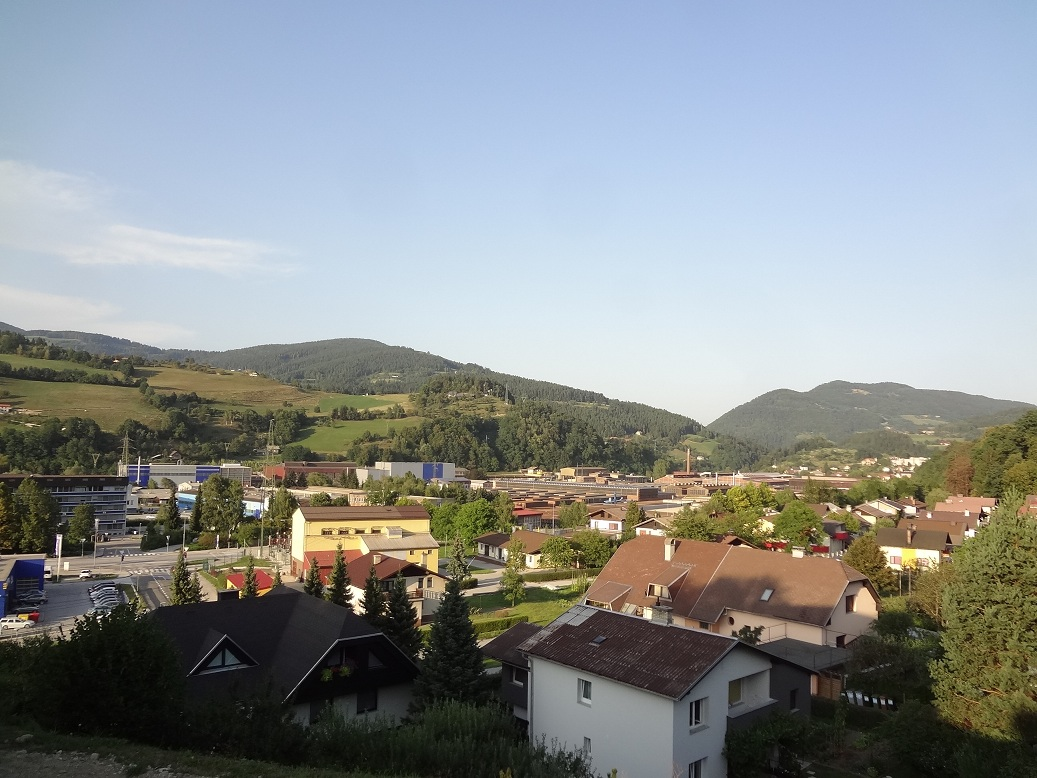

- Location in Slovenia
- Coordinates: 46°32′37.61″N 14°56′31.63″E
- Country: Slovenia
- Traditional region: Carinthia
- Statistical region: Carinthia
- Municipality: Ravne na Koroškem

Area
  - Total: 0.99 km^{2} (0.38 sq mi)
- Elevation: 406.8 m (1,335 ft)

Population (2017)
  - Total: 676

Dobja Vas (pronounced [ˈdoːbja ˈʋaːs]; Slovene: Dobja vas) is a former settlement on the right bank of the Meža River and a neighborhood in urban area of Ravne na Koroškem in the Carinthia region in northern Slovenia. In 2017 it was merged into Ravne na Koroškem.
