= Brdinje =

- Location in Slovenia
- Coordinates: 46°31′33.85″N 14°59′38.46″E
- Country: Slovenia
- Traditional region: Carinthia
- Statistical region: Carinthia
- Municipality: Ravne na Koroškem

Area
  - Total: 5.79 km^{2} (2.24 sq mi)
- Elevation: 486.6 m (1,596 ft)

Population (2002)
  - Total: 625

Brdinje (pronounced [bəɾˈdiːnjɛ]) is a dispersed settlement in the hills southeast of Ravne na Koroškem in the Carinthia region in northern Slovenia.
