= Mount St. Ursula =

Mountain in the country of Slovenia

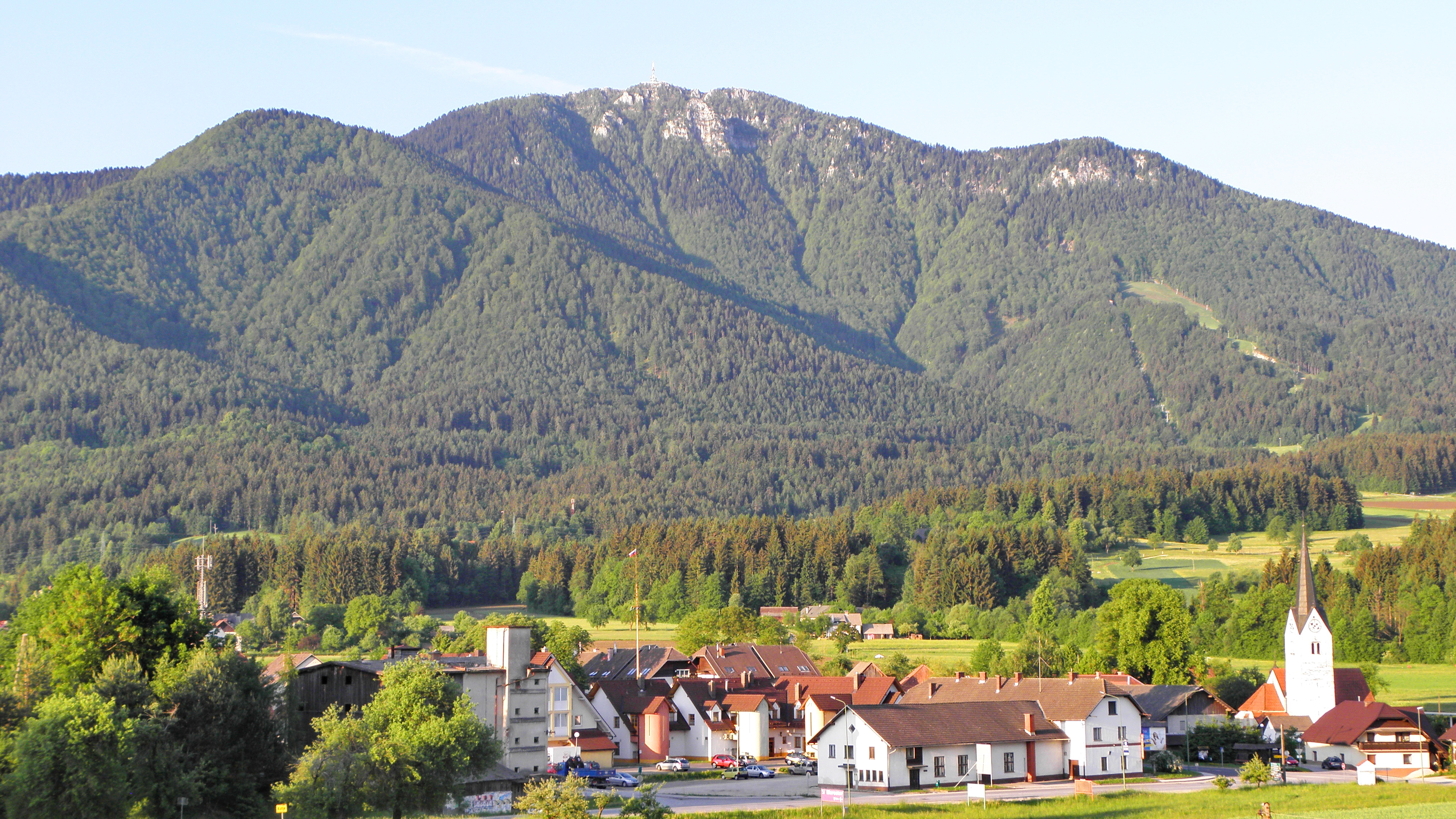
- Mount St. Ursula from Kotlje

Highest point
- Elevation: 1,699 m (5,574 ft)
- Coordinates: 46°29′5.09″N 14°57′55.95″E

Naming
- Native name: Uršlja gora (Slovene)

Geography
- Location within Slovenia
- Location: northern Slovenia
- Parent range: Karawanks

Mount St. Ursula (Slovene: Uršlja gora) or Plešivec (1,699 metres or 5,574 feet) is the easternmost peak of the Karawanks. It lies between the towns of Slovenj Gradec and Črna na Koroškem. There are three villages on the slopes of the mountain: Uršlja Gora, Podgora, and Zgornji Razbor. The mountain offers a panoramic view towards all of Carinthia, the Kozjak Mountains, and the Kamnik–Savinja Alps. Below the peak of Mount St. Ursula stands the Gothic St. Ursula's Church (which gives the mountain its name and is the highest-standing church in Slovenia), a TV mast tower, a mountain lodge (the Mount St. Ursula Lodge, Dom na Uršlji gori), 1,670 m or 5,480 ft), and a monument to the soldiers fallen in World War I.. The name Plešivec (literally, 'the bald one') derives from its grey limestone peak.

== Starting points ==
- Postmen's Lodge Below Plešivec (Poštarski dom pod Plešivcem) (2 h 30 min)
- Naravske Fallows Hut (Koča na Naravskih ledinah) (1 h 45 min)
- The Gate - by road (45 min)
- Lake Ivartnik (Ivarčko jezero) (2 h 30 min)
- Ciganija (2 h 30 min)

== Mast tower ==
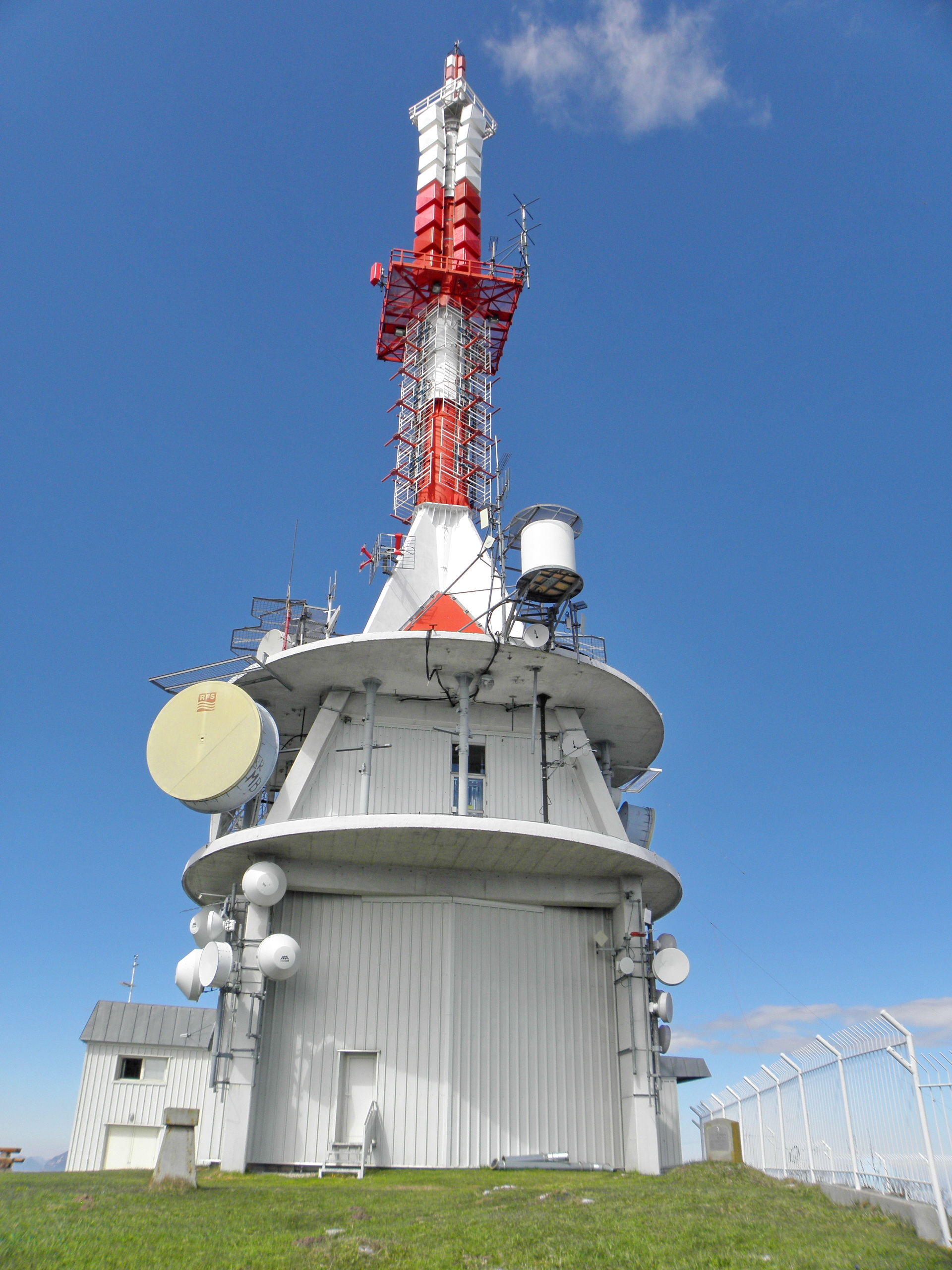
Plešivec mast tower

The Radiotelevizija Slovenija mast tower was built in 1962. The site allows for optimal TV broadcasting towards Carinthia and Styria. It has also been used by firemen, the police, mountain rescuers, and others.

== Climate ==
Mount St. Ursula (Uršlja gora) has a subarctic climate (Köppen Dfc).

Climate data for Uršlja gora 1981-2010 (1696m)
Month	Jan	Feb	Mar	Apr	May	Jun	Jul	Aug	Sep	Oct	Nov	Dec	Year
Mean daily maximum °C (°F)	−1.6 (29.1)	−1.2 (29.8)	1.0 (33.8)	4.5 (40.1)	9.9 (49.8)	12.9 (55.2)	15.5 (59.9)	15.3 (59.5)	11.4 (52.5)	8.0 (46.4)	2.9 (37.2)	−0.7 (30.7)	6.5 (43.7)
Daily mean °C (°F)	−4.3 (24.3)	−4.6 (23.7)	−2.0 (28.4)	1.2 (34.2)	6.3 (43.3)	9.5 (49.1)	11.7 (53.1)	11.7 (53.1)	8.2 (46.8)	5.1 (41.2)	0.3 (32.5)	−3.1 (26.4)	3.3 (38.0)
Mean daily minimum °C (°F)	−6.4 (20.5)	−7.3 (18.9)	−4.6 (23.7)	−1.6 (29.1)	3.5 (38.3)	6.4 (43.5)	8.6 (47.5)	9.0 (48.2)	6.0 (42.8)	2.7 (36.9)	−1.8 (28.8)	−5.3 (22.5)	0.8 (33.4)
Source: Slovenian Environment Agency (ARSO)

== Gallery ==
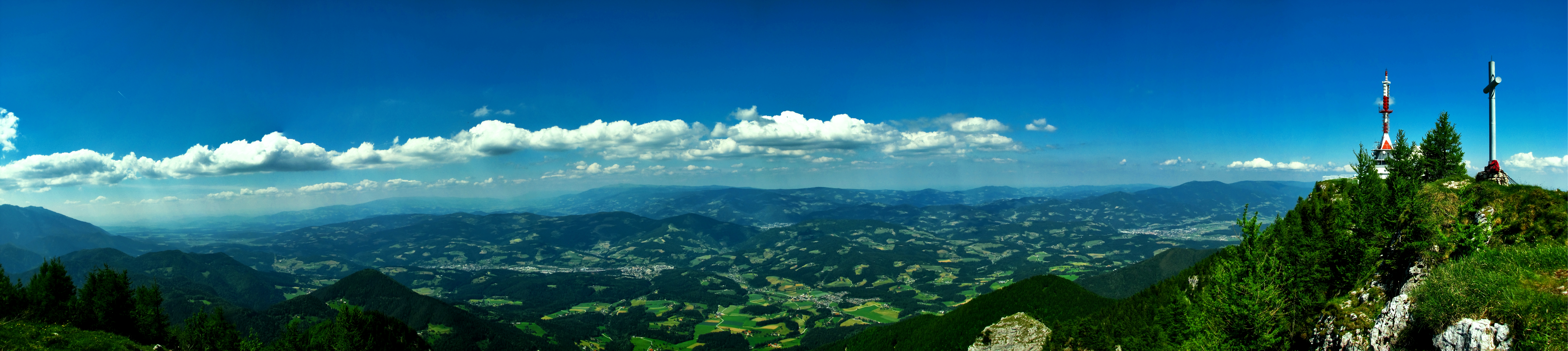
View from Mount St. Ursula, to the right stands the Plešivec radio mast tower

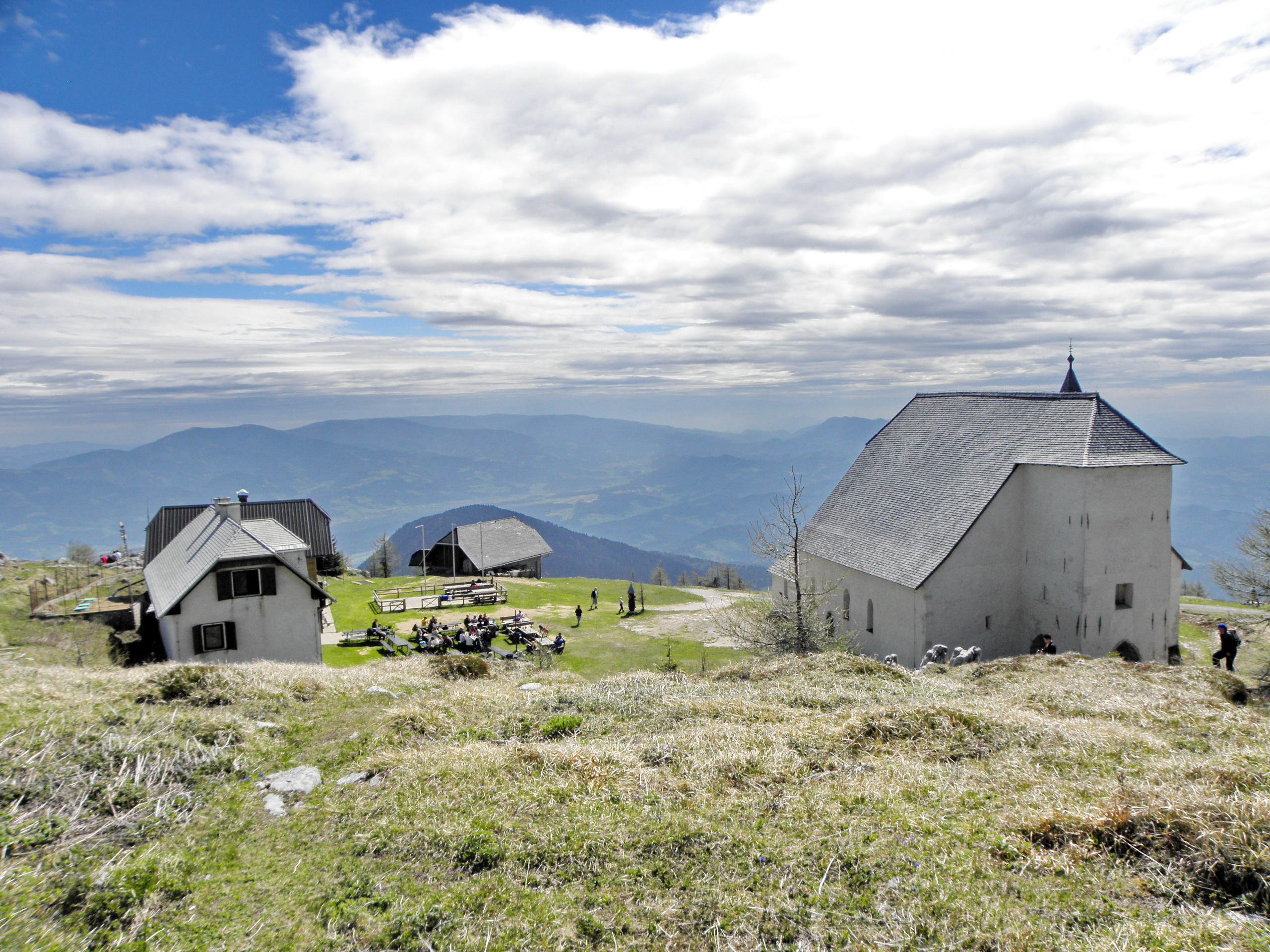
The mountain lodge and the church

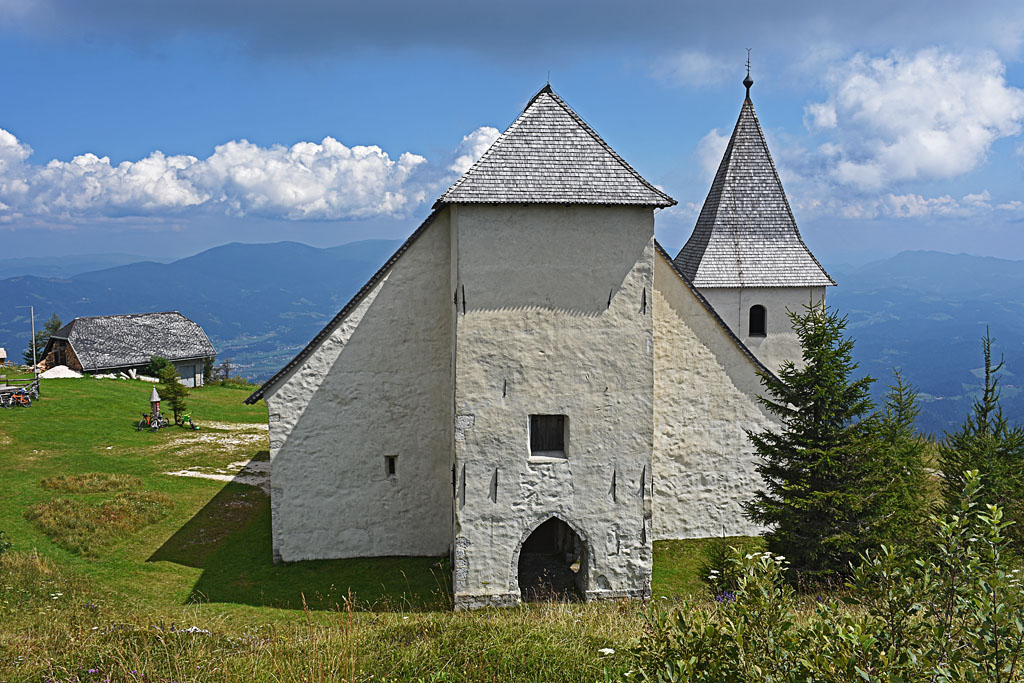
Saint Ursula's Church

== See also ==
- Slovene Mountain Hiking Trail
- List of mountains in Slovenia
