= Navrški Vrh =

- Location in Slovenia
- Coordinates: 46°31′40.29″N 14°56′51.87″E
- Country: Slovenia
- Traditional region: Carinthia
- Statistical region: Carinthia
- Municipality: Ravne na Koroškem

Area
  - Total: 2.58 km^{2} (1.00 sq mi)
- Elevation: 560.5 m (1,839 ft)

Population (2002)
  - Total: 44

Navrški Vrh (pronounced [ˈnaːʋəɾʃki ˈʋəɾx]) is a small dispersed settlement in the hills immediately south of Ravne na Koroškem in the Carinthia region in northern Slovenia.
