= Podkraj, Ravne na Koroškem =

Podkraj
- Location in Slovenia
- Coordinates: 46°30′54.96″N 14°57′18.65″E
- Country: Slovenia
- Traditional region: Carinthia
- Statistical region: Carinthia
- Municipality: Ravne na Koroškem

Area
  - Total: 1.23 km^{2} (0.47 sq mi)
- Elevation: 601.5 m (1,973 ft)

Population (2002)
  - Total: 74

Podkraj (pronounced [pɔtˈkɾai̯] or [ˈpoːtkɾai̯]) is a small settlement in the hills south of Ravne na Koroškem in the Carinthia region in northern Slovenia.
