= Strojna =

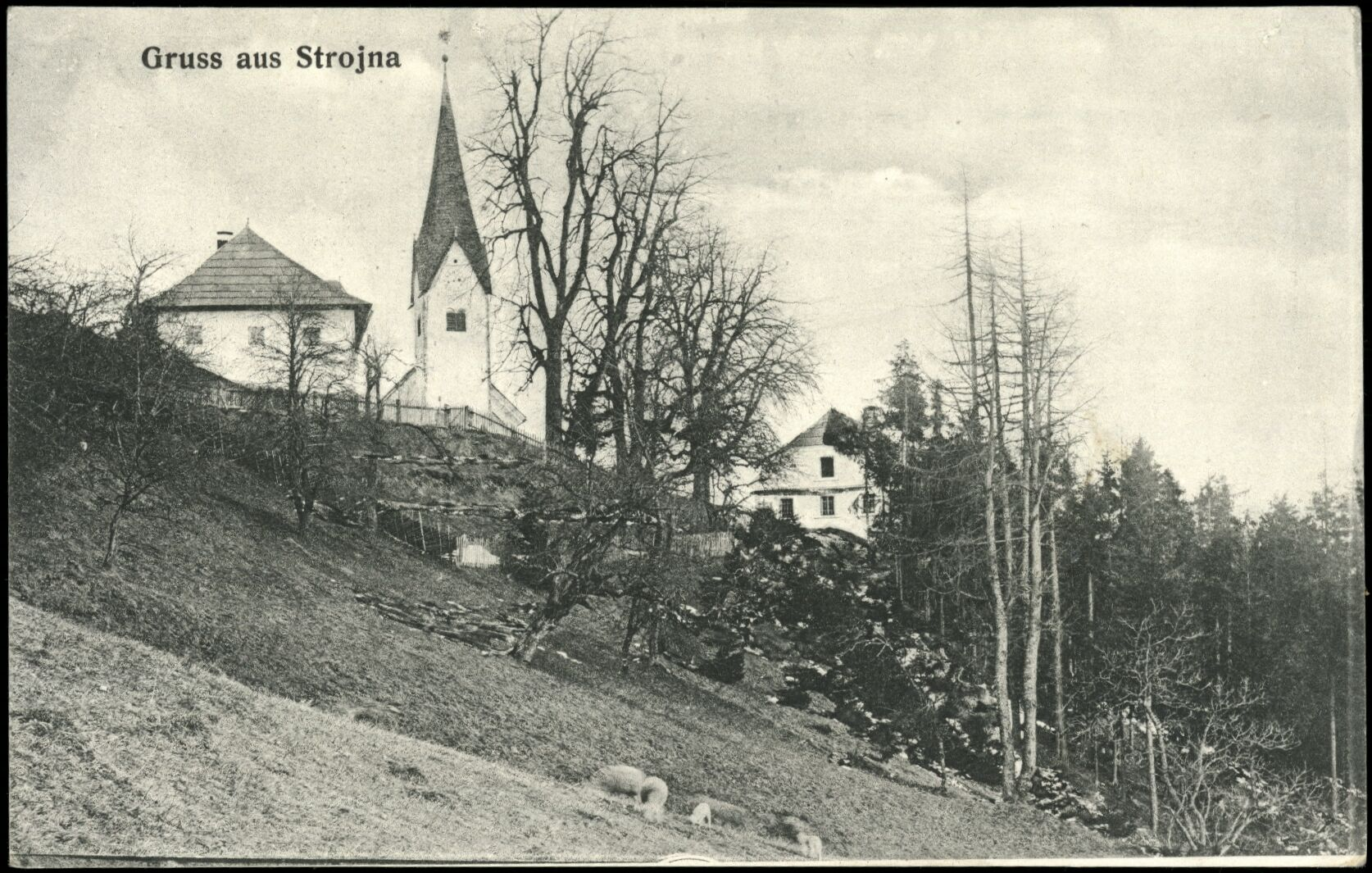
- Strojna on a postcard
- Interactive map of Strojna
- Location in Slovenia
- Coordinates: 46°35′47.01″N 14°54′38.67″E
- Country: Slovenia
- Traditional region: Carinthia
- Statistical region: Carinthia
- Municipality: Ravne na Koroškem

Area
  - Total: 7.43 km^{2} (2.87 sq mi)
- Elevation: 1,008.5 m (3,309 ft)

Population (2002)
  - Total: 117

Strojna (pronounced [ˈstɾoːi̯na]) is a dispersed settlement in the hills northwest of Ravne na Koroškem in the Carinthia region in northern Slovenia, close to the border with Austria.

The local church is dedicated to Saint Ulrich (Slovene: sveti Urh). It was built in 1848.
