= Koroški Selovec =

Koroški Selovec Selovec (until 1953)
- Location in Slovenia
- Coordinates: 46°33′7.45″N 15°0′19.3″E
- Country: Slovenia
- Traditional region: Carinthia
- Statistical region: Carinthia
- Municipality: Ravne na Koroškem

Area
  - Total: 2.91 km^{2} (1.12 sq mi)
- Elevation: 688.4 m (2,259 ft)

Population (2002)
  - Total: 81

Koroški Selovec ([kɔˈɾóːʃki sɛˈlɔːʋəts, -ˈloːʋ-]) is a dispersed settlement in the hills east of Ravne na Koroškem in the Carinthia region in northern Slovenia.

== Name ==
The name of the settlement was changed from Selovec to Koroški Selovec in 1953.
