= Zelen Breg =

- Location in Slovenia
- Coordinates: 46°34′36.46″N 14°56′0.04″E
- Country: Slovenia
- Traditional region: Carinthia
- Statistical region: Carinthia
- Municipality: Ravne na Koroškem

Area
  - Total: 5.25 km^{2} (2.03 sq mi)
- Elevation: 745.1 m (2,445 ft)

Population (2002)
  - Total: 169

Zelen Breg (pronounced [ˈzeːlɛn ˈbɾeːk]) is a dispersed settlement in the hills north of Ravne na Koroškem in the Carinthia region in northern Slovenia. Locally the settlement is known as Šelenberg.
