= Grotta dell'Artiglieria =

Cave in Italy

Grotta dell'Artiglieria (Artillery Cave)
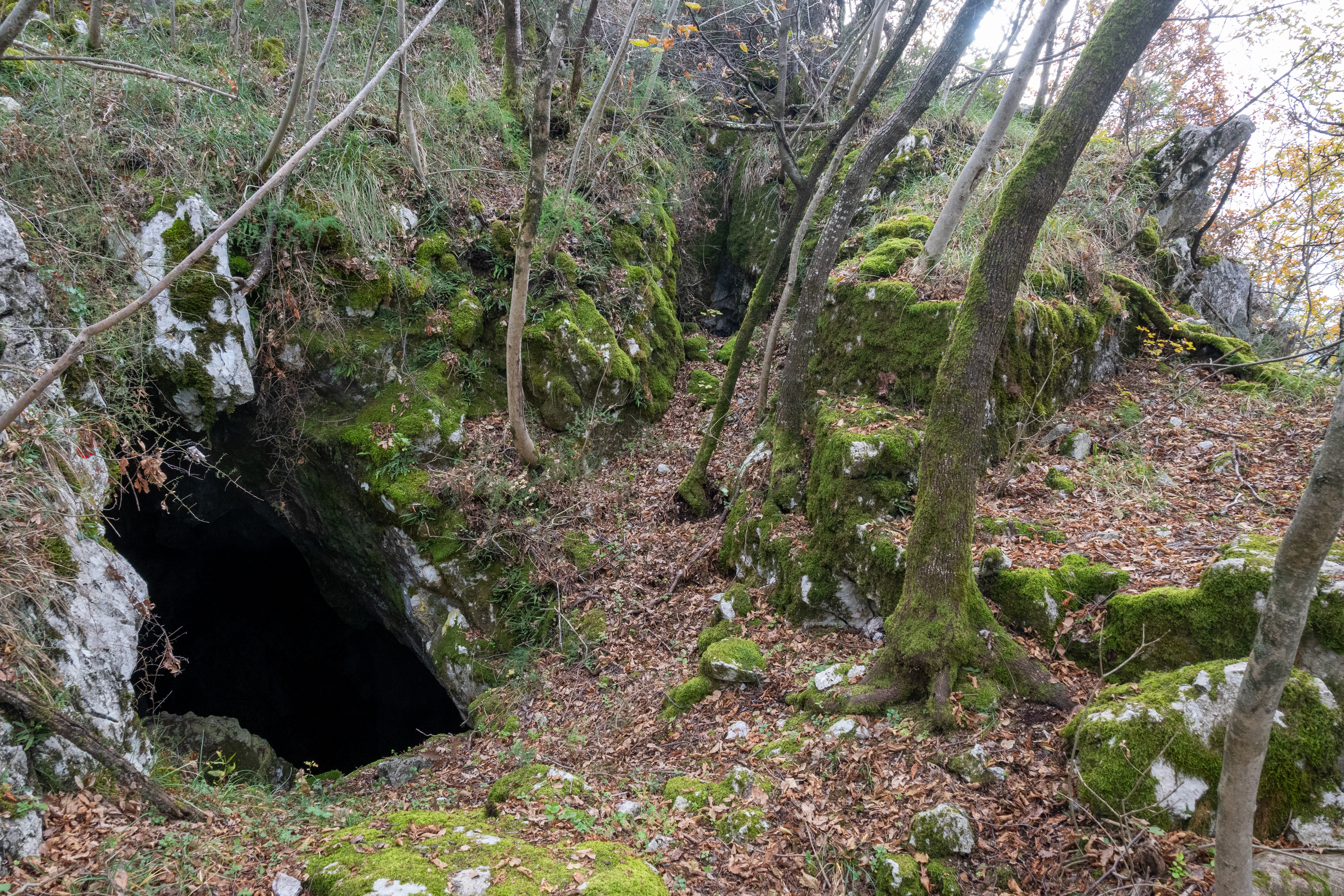

- Location within Italy
- Location: Doberdò del Lago (GO, Friuli-Venezia Giulia, Italy)
- Coordinates: 45°49′56.97″N 13°34′18.58″E
- Depth: 42.5 m (139 ft)
- Length: 95.9 m (315 ft)
- Elevation: 187 m (614 ft)
- Geology: Karst cave
- Entrances: 1
- Difficulty: Speleological
- Lighting: No
- Features: Subhorizontal

Grotta dell'Artiglieria ("Artillery Cave") is a karst cave in the municipality of Doberdò del Lago (Gorizia, Friuli-Venezia Giulia, Italy). The cave is located NE of Doberdob Lake, near the top of a small hill, in the small village of Jamiano. The name is referred to the artillery battery set in the cave during World War I.

== Morphology ==
Grotta dell'Artiglieria opens 187 m (614 ft) above sea level. Overall, it is 95.9 m (315 ft) long and 42.5 m (139 ft) deep. The cave is made up of three main rooms, connected by small pits. The entrance is vertical and leads to the first room. On the left side of this cavern, a 10 m (33 ft) pit leads to the second room. Another small pit, made up of collapsed bedrocks, leads to the last room, which is the biggest one. This room is full of cave formations and declines subhorizontally until reaching the deepest part of the cave.

== History ==
The cave entrance is located in the vicinity of a panoramic viewpoint, whence it is possible to observe most of the Gorizia Karst, including Doberdob Lake. Because of its location, during World War I, the Austro-Hungarian Army used the first part of the cave as an observation post and placed an artillery battery in it. The Italian Army also used the cavity when occupying the area. Still now, the remains of a small plaque dedicated to an Italian Artillery Regiment can be seen next to the entrance.

== Fauna ==
In the last decades, the cave was known to be the refuge of an important bat colony, including some hundred specimens. Bat species are the common bent-wing bat Miniopterus schreibersiii and the Mediterranean horseshoe bat Rhinolophus euryale. Recently, the colony has strongly decreased and, at certain periods of the year, is completely absent. A fair number of individuals (about 30) has recently been observed between September and October, the breeding season, immediately prior to hibernation. Why the colony has decreased and where individuals move throughout the year are still unknown.

The Bat colony causes a huge amount of bat guano to accumulate in the innermost part of the cave. A large invertebrate community developed using guano as primary food source. Invertebrates are cave dwelling species typical of the Karst area. Troglobites include woodlouses Alpioniscus strasseri and Androniscus stygius, and the round fungus beetle Bathysciotes khevenhulleri tergestinus. Troglophiles include the spiders Nesticus eremita and Troglohyphantes excavatus, the cave cricket Troglophilus neglectus, the cricket Gryllomorpha dalmatina, the moth Scoliopteryx libatrix, the fly Limonia nubeculosa and an unidentified phorid fly species, the ground beetles Laemostenus cavicola and Laemostenus elongatus, and the rove beetle Atheta spelaea.
