= Prežihov Voranc =

Slovene writer and communist political activist

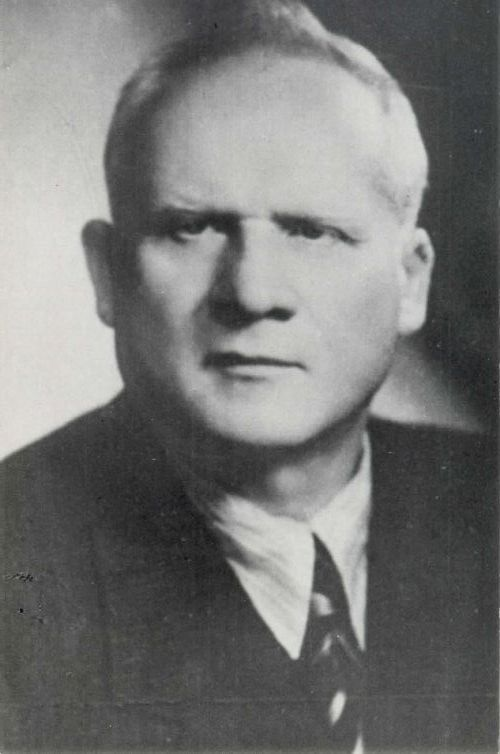
- Born: Lovro Kuhar; 10 August 1893; Podgora, Duchy of Carinthia, Austria-Hungary
- Died: 18 February 1950 (aged 56); Maribor, Yugoslavia
- Citizenship: various
- Occupations: Novelist, short story writer
- Writing career
- Pen name: Prežihov Voranc
- Subject: Social realism
- Notable works: Samorastniki (1940), Doberdob (1939), Jamnica (1940)

Prežihov Voranc (10 August 1893 – 18 February 1950) was the pen name of Lovro Kuhar, a Slovene writer and communist political activist. Voranc's literary reputation was established during the 1930s with a series of Slovene novels and short stories in the social realist style, notable for their depictions of poverty in rural and industrial areas of Slovenia. His most important novels are Požganica (1939) and Doberdob (1940).

== Biography ==
=== Formative years ===
Prežihov Voranc was baptized Laurentius Kuhar in Podgora near Kotlje, a Slovene-speaking village in Carinthia, then part of Austria-Hungary. He was the son of tenant farmers who later acquired their own land. His younger brother, Alojzij Kuhar, became a renowned liberal conservative politician and historian. His pen name is a typical folk formulation derived from the estate name of the farm the family lived on (the Prežih farm) plus the Carninthian dialect form of the name Lovrenc (or Lovro); thus, Prežihov Voranc literally means 'Lovro from the Prežih farm'.

The steep mountain slopes of his homeland were hard to farm, and Voranc consistently returned to his childhood of drudgery and fortitude. He received little formal education beyond primary (elementary) school and later a course in co-operative management. He was, however, a man who wished to educate himself and for much of his life he self studied and read voraciously.

In 1909, Voranc's first published work appeared in the Slovene magazine Domači Prijatelj, edited by the writer Zofka Kveder. It was the first of many short stories for the magazine usually depicting the lives of farm labourers and rural characters from his Carinthian homeland. Between 1911 and 1912, Voranc spent time in Trieste where he became more political aware writing of the travails of social misfits and unemployed drifters for the Social-Democrat newspaper Zarja.

=== Service in World War I ===
At the outbreak of World War I, he was immediately drafted into the Austro-Hungarian Army. He saw action and was captured in 1916 spending the remainder of the war in POW camps in Italy. As a soldier he continued writing often about the psychology of soldiers in warfare drawing on his surroundings and depicting the lives of the soldiers that he knew and with whom he had fought.

=== Political activism ===
Voranc was released in 1919 and returned to a Carinthia that was in political and cultural ferment. He took a job in the offices of a workers' co-operative at the steelworks in Guštajn. He became increasingly radicalized and a supporter of Carinthian political integration into the newly formed Yugoslav state. He continued to write, and in 1925 he published his first short story Povesti. It was not especially well received by the intelligentsia in Ljubljana; one review dismissed the work as by "talented proletarian, a self-taught writer." Nevertheless, it contains "elements that were later to develop into his highly acclaimed style."

In 1930 his political activism in the illegal Communist Party of Yugoslavia resulted in a threat of arrest and Voranc absented himself from Carinthia and moved to Vienna and from there, Prague in 1931 and hence to Berlin in 1932. What appears to have been a period of instability in his life was also a period of active collaboration with other socialists in Europe and during the early thirties he also visited Romania, Bulgaria, Greece, Norway, and France. He edited the magazine Delo in Vienna from 1932 to 1934 but fell foul of the Austrian authorities, who imprisoned him in 1937. In the years immediately before the Second World War Voranc was working in Paris as a librarian mixing with other political emigres.

=== Sodobnost ===
In 1933, a new left-wing literary review was founded in Slovenia, called Sodobnost, propagating socialist views. Voranc' themes of social realism quickly found favor with the new review's editors, Josip Vidmar, Fran Albreht and Ferdo Kozak. The changing socio-economic conditions of the 1930s necessitated writers who could convey social realism, who could argue and inform and represent the lives of working-class people . Voranc' contributions to Sodobnost established his literary reputation when he was already in his forties. His first story Boj na požiralniku, (in 1982 made into a film of the same title) exhibits Voranc's unique style: realistic events of Slovenian life are described within the context of an impressionistic landscape. The characters are as large as the landscape in which they live and their language in vernacular and realistic. The story focuses on a downtrodden family who are in part despised by their better off neighbors, one of whom describes then as ‘polecats’. The family exists on the margins of Slovenian society, toiling the land in an endless fight for survival which some of them fail to achieve. Voranc depicts death and children fighting to survive into adulthood. Boj na požiralniku caused a literary sensation and five more stories followed in the years 1935 to 39 which were later collected together as Samorastniki. All deal with peasants lives in the Carinthian mountains, a region that had rarely featured in Slovene literature. The characters speak in the vernacular of the region, they are possessed of a resilient fortitude against the strife of their lives and whilst they are often overly superstitious, egotistical and obdurate Voranc also records them as: faithful, brave, honest and possessing of a religious faith that is true and sincere.

In 1939, Sodobnost published a collection of Prežihov Voranc's works under the title Samorastniki. It included Ljubezen na odoru (Passion Above the Precipice) and Vodnjak (The Self-Sown), available in English translations. Voranc left Paris and returned swiftly to Slovenia upon the outbreak of war living in Ljubljana and then in Mokronog. Upon his return he worked on an unfinished novel Požganica that had been started whilst he was in prison in Vienna.The novel set against the background of the end of the Great War is one of his most politically dogmatic and according to one critic 'marred by some overly naturalistic scenes, by over simplification of some characters and by political preaching' .

=== Later novels ===
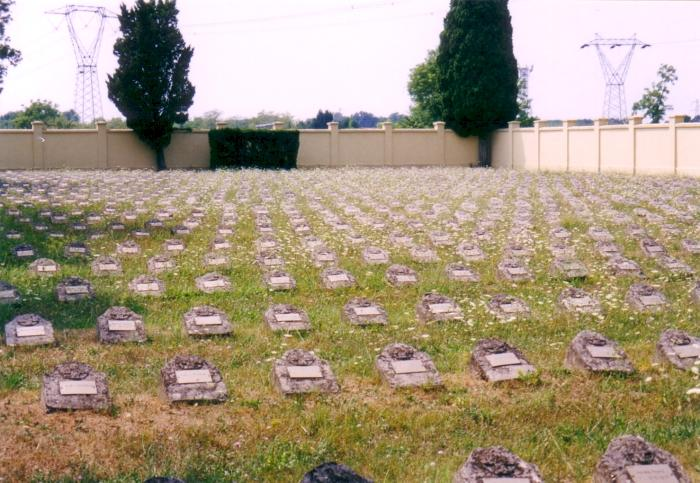
Austro-Hungarian military cemetery in Doberdò commemorating the fallen of World War I

His novel Doberdob, which was published in 1941, had already had a checkered past, with the first two manuscripts seized or stolen. (Note: The title of the book referred to Doberdob, slovenskih fantov grob ("Doberdò, the grave of Slovene lads"), a lament to the Slovene dead of the Battle of Doberdò near the village of Doberdò del Lago during the First World War, In fact Voranc subtitles the novel as "The War Novel of the Slovenian People".) The third version is mostly a string of anecdotes and meditations on the lives of the Slovenes. It is a fiercely nationalistic novel surrounding the Battle of Doberdò. Doberdò has become the central symbolic place of the Slovene victims of World War I in part because of Voranc's novel. His third novel, Jamnica, is set in a rural Carinthian village between the two wars at a period when the values of rural society are being challenged by increasing industrialization. It remained unpublished until 1946.

=== Axis annexation and the "cultural silence" ===
In April 1941, following the invasion of Yugoslavia, Nazi Germany annexed northern Slovenia, while Ljubljana and Mokronog were annexed by the Italian troops (and then occupied in 1943 by the Germans). Voranc feared for his life and left Slovenia once again for the Croatian capital Zagreb and then to the Bosnian countryside. However, he seems to have had a change of heart and decided to return to Ljubljana for the duration of the war. He did not join the resistance movement, but on 11 September he met clandestinely with other writers to proclaim the self-imposed "cultural silence," which prohibited publication, exhibitions, and performances by Slovene artists for the duration of the war.

As a suspected communist sympathizer, Voranc was arrested in January 1943 and transported to the Sachsenhausen and Mauthausen-Gusen concentration camps. He returned to Ljubljana at the end of the war sick and depressed and unable to communicate with his family and comrades. He returned to his native village in Carinthia, where he ceased political activity and removed himself from the political actualities of the newly formed communist Yugoslavia. He worked on Solzice, a historical novel that remained unfinished at the time of his death in Maribor in 1950.

== Themes in Voranc's writings ==
As a child and youth, Voranc experienced first hand the back-breaking drudgery of farming steep mountain slopes, and the theme of the farmer fighting the unyielding soil is recurrent in much of his writing. The mountains of Carinthia and the working-class people within them remained at the heart of Voranc's philosophical work. The beauty of the scenery is conveyed against the backdrop of shared toil and camaraderie. Voranc was drawn to the unfortunate and unjustly treated people he witnessed.

His experiences during World War I undeniably left a deep impression on his psyche. The reality of war on the mind is especially explored in his novel Doberdob. Voranc wished to convey to his reader the realism of the situation in which his characters lived and there is little that is sentimental about his depictions. Voranc preferred to write about the impoverished peasant and industrial working class against the impressionistic backdrop of a land that sometimes colludes against the peasant. His socialist leanings are key to understanding his later work. During the 1930s, while living away from his homeland, he became more aware of international socialism, although he adapted realism in his work to suit Slovene sensibilities.

== Selected bibliography (Slovene) ==
- Boj na požiralniku (1935),
- Požganica (1939)
- Jamnica (1945)
- Doberdob (1940)
- Samorastniki (1940) consisting of a series of short stories that included:
- Jirs in Bavh, Vodnjak
- Ljubezen na odoru
- Pot na klop
- Prvi spopad, Odpustki in Samorastniki
- Vodnjak

== Selected bibliography (English / German) ==
- Prežihov Voranc. 1983. The Self-Sown, Bilingual edition of a Slovene classic. New Orleans: Prometej. (English)
- Prežihov Voranc. 1994. Two short stories, "The Self-Sown" and "Passion above the Precipice." Translation and introduction by Irma Marija Ana Ožbalt. Ljubljana: Slovene Writers Association. (English)
- Prežihov Voranc. 2012. Winter in Klagenfurt. Drei Geschichten. Translated by Jozej Strutz. Klagenfurt: Kitab, ISBN 9783902878106. (German)
- Vienna, Paris, Saualm. Stories and reports, from the Slovenian by Jozej Strutz, Drava-Verlag, Klagenfurt 2016, ISBN 978-3-85435-776-6. (German)
