= Abisso Bonetti =

Karst cave in northeastern Italy

Abisso Bonetti (Bonetti Abyss)
- Prhavčja jama
- Location within Italy
- Location: Doberdò del Lago (GO, Friuli-Venezia Giulia, Italy)
- Coordinates: 45°50′00.28″N 13°34′50.11″E
- Depth: 49 m (161 ft)
- Length: 87.5 m (287 ft)
- Elevation: 186 m (610 ft)
- Geology: Karst cave
- Entrances: 2
- Difficulty: Speleological
- Access: Only cavers
- Lighting: No
- Features: Vertical and horizontal

Abisso Bonetti ("Bonetti Abyss") is a Karst cave in the municipality of Doberdò del Lago (Gorizia, Friuli-Venezia Giulia, Italy), 1 km (0.62 mi) SE from the small village of Bonetti, near Slovenian border (village of Nova vas). The cave is one of the most famous cavities in the Gorizia Karst. Anyway, due to its dangerous pit opening, entry is allowed only to expert cavers with the necessary equipment for single-rope descend.

== Morphology ==
Abisso Bonetti is one of the biggest and most well-known cavities in the Gorizia Karst. It opens 186 m (610 ft) above sea level, on a small plateau north of Jamiano (Doberdò del Lago), near Slovenian border. Overall, it is 87.5 m (287 ft) long and 49 m (161 ft) deep.

Peculiarity of the cavity is its impressive opening, a 48 m (157 ft) deep, 30 m (98 ft) for 10 m (33 ft) wide abyss, that's an open pit in direct connection with the external environment. The cave has another entrance, that's a partially artificial gallery connected with the pit. During World War I, Austro-Hungarian Army built a shelter in the gallery. The bottom part of the open pit contains a rubble slope where detritus, plant materials and animal carrions, fallen down from the external environment, are collected. The innermost part of the cave is made up of an underground gallery after that, passing through a tight passage, a big hall is reached. The hall contains collapsed bedrocks and cave formations, including a column that seems like holding up the weight of the ceiling.

Abisso Bonetti shows a climatic peculiarity. The innermost part of the cave has a stable temperature (12 °C (54 °F), that's the annual mean temperature in the place where the cave opens), a typical feature of cavities. In the bottom part of the open pit, the temperature varies between 10 °C (50 °F) in summer and 2 °C (36 °F) in winter. This part of the cave can be considered a cold trap.

== History ==
During World War I, between 1916 and 1917, Austro-Hungarian Army used the cave as a shelter and as a field hospital, and adapted it through opening a new entrance in the gallery next to the pit. Because of the present of a number of pigeons, Austro-Hungarians called the cave Taubenloch Höhle or Taubenschlucht ("Pigeons Hole"). The same name (Slovene: Golobinka) was also used by Slovenian people living in the area. In the spring of 1917, Italian Army occupied the whole area and used the cave as a shelter. In 1946, the Rastrellatori ("bomb disposal") unit extracted a number of explosive remnants of war from the cave. However, some remnants of World War I can be found in the cave yet.

In addition to the military use, the cave has drawn speleologists' attention. The first survey of the cavity was realised by Colonel Italo Garibotti (SAG) in January 1923. The survey was reviewed by Ugo Stocker (Gruppo Speleologico Monfalconese) on 16 June 1968. During last decades, many speleology schools have used the cave in their first-level courses.

Since the 80ths, scientist have carried out a number of botanical, zoological and geological studies and researches in the cave.

== The fauna ==
Abisso Bonetti represents one of the four localities where the ground beetle Typhlotrechus bilimeki tergestinus, a troglobious, depigmented and anophthalmic predator species, can be observed. Other species hosted in the cave are cave dwelling species typical of the Karst area. Troglobites include the spider Mesostalita nocturna, the woodlouses Alpioniscus strasseri and Androniscus stygius, and the round fungus beetle Bathysciotes khevenhulleri tergestinus. Troglophiles include the millipede Brachydesmus subterraneus, two centipede lithobid species, the cave cricket Troglophilus neglectus, the moth Triphosa dubitata, the fly Limonia nubeculosa and an unidentified phorid fly species, the ground beetle Laemostenus cavicola, and the rove beetles Atheta spelaea e Quedius mesomelinus. In addition, bats (in particular the greater horseshoe bat Rhinolophus ferrumequinum) and birds (e.g. some specimen of tawny owl) use the first part of the cavity as a refuge.

The bottom part of the open pit hosts a number of trogloxene insects, spiders, amphibians and reptiles. In summer, these animals are attracted by low temperature and humidity coming from the pit and fall down. However, if they survive the fall, they stay trapped and cannot return to the external environment.

== The flora ==
In general, the lack of sunlight in caves prevents photosynthesis and plant growth. However, the particular morphology of Abisso Bonetti (a deep pit with a large opening) lets a certain amount of light penetrate the pit, allowing the growth of some plant species. Vegetation in Abisso Bonetti can be divided in four vegetational zones, that are from the top (extern) to the bottom (intern) of the pit:

- liminal zone (0–10 m (0–33 ft)): this well-lighted zone hosts trees and herbs growing in the external environment (typical plants of Seslerio-Ostryetum), and some fern species (genera Asplenium and Polypodium)
- sub-liminal zone (10–25 m (33–82 ft)): this zone hosts phanerogames (common hazel, balm-leaved archangel, wall lettuce, cyclamen, drooping bittercress), ferns (maidenhair spleenwort and hart's-tongue), mosses (especially Thamnobryium alopecurum) and the first green algae colonies
- sub-dark zone (25–40 m (82–131 ft)): this zone, where light is strongly reduced, hosts mosses, hepatics and some remaining ferns (maidenhair spleenwort)
- dark zone (40–49 m (131–161 ft)): only bacteria and green algae colonies can survive here, where light is absent but humidity is high; moreover, molds and fungi (non-photosynthetic organisms) grow on decomposing substances

== Geology ==
In the 90ths, two minerals was found for the first time in an Italian cave. These are crandallite and octacalcium phosphate (OCP).
