= Alojzij Kuhar =

Slovenian and Yugoslav politician, diplomat, historian and journalist

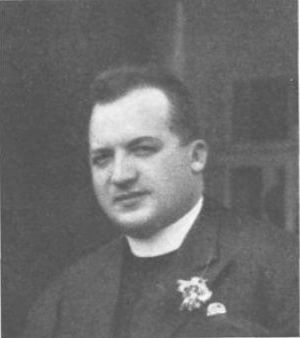
- Born: 18 June 1895; Kotlje, Austria-Hungary
- Died: 28 October 1958 (aged 63); New York City, United States
- Education: University of Cambridge
- Occupations: Politician, diplomat, priest
- Political party: Slovene People's Party

Alojzij Kuhar (18 June 1895 – 28 October 1958) was a Slovenian and Yugoslav politician, diplomat, historian and journalist. Together with Izidor Cankar and Franc Snoj, he was an important exponent of the liberal conservative fraction of the Slovene People's Party.

== Biography ==
Kuhar was born into a Carinthian Slovene family in Kotlje near Ravne na Koroškem, Austro-Hungarian Empire (now in Slovenia). One of his brothers was Lovro Kuhar, better known under the pen name of Prežihov Voranc, who became a renowned communist activist during the interwar period.

Alojzij was an ordained Roman Catholic priest. In 1919, he studied law in Paris. In the 1920s and 1930s, he served in the diplomatic service of the Kingdom of Yugoslavia, while simultaneously working as the editor on foreign policy for the conservative newspaper Slovenec. After the Axis invasion of Yugoslavia in April 1941, he emigrated to New York City and then to London, where he collaborated in the activities of the Yugoslav Government in exile. Together with Miha Krek, Franc Snoj, and Izidor Cankar, he formed the core of the Slovene People's Party in exile. Between 1942 and 1944, he worked as the Slovene speaker for Radio London, and was later replaced by Boris Furlan.

After the Treaty of Vis between the Yugoslav Prime Minister in exile Ivan Šubašić and the Yugoslav partisan leader Josip Broz Tito, Kuhar unsuccessfully tried to convince the leadership of the Slovene People's Party to recognize the Yugoslav pro-communist resistance, and was also unsuccessful in his protestations that the collaborationist Slovene Home Guard should join forces with the communist Liberation Front of the Slovenian People. Unlike his contemporaries Izidor Cankar and Franc Snoj, who returned to Slovenia at the end of World War II, Kuhar remained in exile, where he assumed a highly critical attitude toward the new communist regime.

In 1949, he obtained a PhD at the University of Cambridge with a thesis on the Christianisation of the Slovenes in the Middle Ages. He settled in New York City in 1950, where he died in 1958.

== Works ==
- The Conversion of the Slovenes and the German-Slav Ethnic Boundary in the Eastern Alps (New York, 1959)
- Slovene Medieval History: Selected Studies (New York, 1962)
- Beg iz Beograda aprila 1941 (Escape from Belgrade in April 1941; edited by Janez A. Arnež, Ljubljana, 1998)
