= Sele, Ravne na Koroškem =

Sele
- Location in Slovenia
- Coordinates: 46°30′54.98″N 15°0′23.97″E
- Country: Slovenia
- Traditional region: Carinthia
- Statistical region: Carinthia
- Municipality: Ravne na Koroškem

Area
  - Total: 0.07 km^{2} (0.027 sq mi)
- Elevation: 472.7 m (1,551 ft)
- The data in this infobox refers only to the part of the settlement in the Municipality of Ravne na Koroškem

Sele (pronounced [ˈseːlɛ]) is a dispersed settlement in the hills east of Kotlje in the Carinthia region in northern Slovenia. A very small part of the settlement lies in the Municipality of Ravne na Koroškem. The major part is in the Municipality of Slovenj Gradec.
