= Tolsti Vrh pri Ravnah na Koroškem, Ravne na Koroškem =

Tolsti Vrh pri Ravnah na Koroškem
- Location in Slovenia
- Coordinates: 46°33′53.14″N 14°57′57.07″E
- Country: Slovenia
- Traditional region: Carinthia
- Statistical region: Carinthia
- Municipality: Ravne na Koroškem

Area
  - Total: 12.27 km^{2} (4.74 sq mi)
- Elevation: 587.5 m (1,927 ft)

Population (2002)
  - Total: 825
- The data in the infobox refer only to the part of the settlement in the Municipality of Ravne na Koroškem.

Tolsti Vrh pri Ravnah na Koroškem (pronounced [ˈtɔːʍsti ˈʋəɾx pɾi ˈɾáːwnax na kɔˈɾóːʃkɛm]) is a dispersed settlement in the hills north of Ravne na Koroškem in the Carinthia region in northern Slovenia. A small part of the settlement lies in the Municipality of Dravograd.

== Name ==
The name of the settlement literally means 'fat peak near Ravne in Carinthia'. It is the longest official toponym in Slovenia. However, several other names are longer when written out in full, such as Sveti Trije Kralji v Slovenskih Goricah.
