= Dobrije =

- Location in Slovenia
- Coordinates: 46°33′4.54″N 14°59′23.43″E
- Country: Slovenia
- Traditional region: Carinthia
- Statistical region: Carinthia
- Municipality: Ravne na Koroškem

Area
  - Total: 0.57 km^{2} (0.22 sq mi)
- Elevation: 372.7 m (1,223 ft)

Population (2002)
  - Total: 78

Dobrije (pronounced [ˈdoːbɾijɛ]) is a small settlement on the right and left banks of the Meža River in the Municipality of Ravne na Koroškem in the Carinthia region in northern Slovenia.

There is a small chapel in the settlement. It was built in 1917 and has an elliptical floor plan with a belfry.
