= Jazbina, Črna na Koroškem =

Jazbina
- Location in Slovenia
- Coordinates: 46°27′54.79″N 14°54′54.43″E
- Country: Slovenia
- Traditional region: Carinthia
- Statistical region: Carinthia
- Municipality: Črna na Koroškem

Area
  - Total: 13.39 km^{2} (5.17 sq mi)
- Elevation: 1,020.2 m (3,347 ft)

Population (2020)
  - Total: 39
  - Density: 2.9/km^{2} (7.5/sq mi)

Jazbina (pronounced [ˈjaːzbina]) is a dispersed settlement in the hills east of Črna na Koroškem in the Carinthia region in northern Slovenia.

There is a church in the settlement, built on the peak of Mount St. Ursula (Slovene: Uršlja gora) at an elevation of 1,699 m. It is dedicated to Saint Ursula and belongs to the Parish of Stari Trg. It is a pilgrimage church that started being built around 1570, but was only completed in the early 17th century and was dedicated in 1602. The belfry dates to 1614. It has a triple nave divided by Gothic arcades and five altars.
