= Požganica =

1939 novel by Prežihov Voranc

- Cover of book
- Author: Prežihov Voranc
- Language: Slovenian
- Publication place: Slovenia

Požganica is a novel by Slovenian author Prežihov Voranc. It was first published in 1939, but was based on a short story first published in 1920. The author presents the work happening in Carinthia after the First World War with the Carinthian Plebiscite and, consequently, the fate of the Carinthian Slovenes under Austria.

== See also ==
- List of Slovenian novels
