= Doberdò del Lago =

Doberdò del Lago Doberdob (Slovene)
- Comune
- Comune di Doberdò del Lago; Občina Doberdob
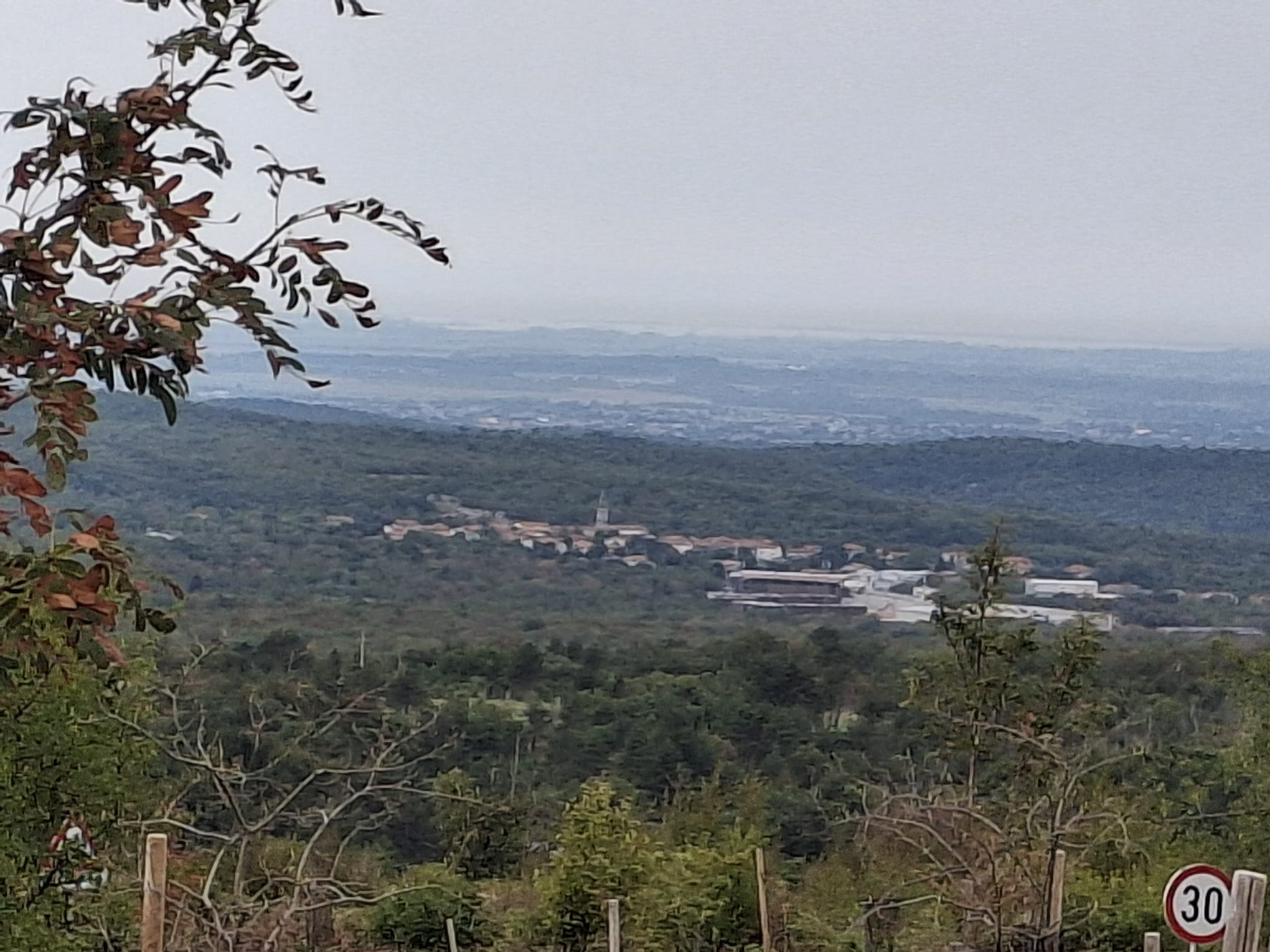

- Coat of arms

- Location within Italy Location within Friuli-Venezia Giulia
- Coordinates: 45°50′36.56″N 13°32′26.24″E
- Country: Italy
- Region: Friuli-Venezia Giulia
- Province: Gorizia (GO)
- Frazioni: Devetachi/Devetaki, Jamiano/Jamlje, Marcottini/Poljane, Visintini/Vižintini, Palchisce/Palkišče, Micoli/Mikoli, Bonetti/Boneti, Berne/Brni, Ferletti/Ferletiči, Sablici/Sabliči, Issari/Hišarji, Lago di Doberdò/Doberdobsko jezero.

Government
  - Mayor: Fabio Vizintin

Area
  - Total: 26.9 km^{2} (10.4 sq mi)
- Elevation: 92 m (302 ft)

Population (2008 According to the 1971 census, 96% of the population are Slovenes.)
  - Total: 1,475
  - Density: 54.8/km^{2} (142/sq mi)
- Demonym: Doberdovesi
- Time zone: UTC+1 (CET)
  - Summer (DST): UTC+2 (CEST)
- Postal code: 34070
- Dialing code: 0481
- Website: Official website

Doberdò del Lago (Slovene: Doberdob; Bisiacco: Dobardò; Friulian: Dobardò) is a comune (municipality) in the Regional decentralization entity of Gorizia in the Italian region of Friuli-Venezia Giulia, located about 30 kilometres (19 mi) northwest of Trieste and about 11 kilometres (7 mi) southwest of Gorizia, and borders the following municipalities: Duino-Aurisina, Fogliano Redipuglia, Komen (Slovenia), Miren-Kostanjevica (Slovenia), Monfalcone, Ronchi dei Legionari, Sagrado and Savogna d'Isonzo. It is located in the westernmost part of the Karst Plateau.

It is inhabited mostly by Slovenes. Before World War I, Slovene-speakers comprised almost the totality (around 99%) of the population. In the 1971 census, 96% of the inhabitants were Slovene-speaking. Since then, the number of Slovenes has slightly fallen, mostly due to the increased immigration of Italian speakers from neighboring towns of Monfalcone and Ronchi dei Legionari. Today, an estimated 86% of the inhabitants belong to the Slovene ethnic minority.

Doberdò localities include Devetachi/Devetaki, Jamiano/Jamlje, Marcottini/Poljane, and Visintini/Vižintini.

== Geography ==
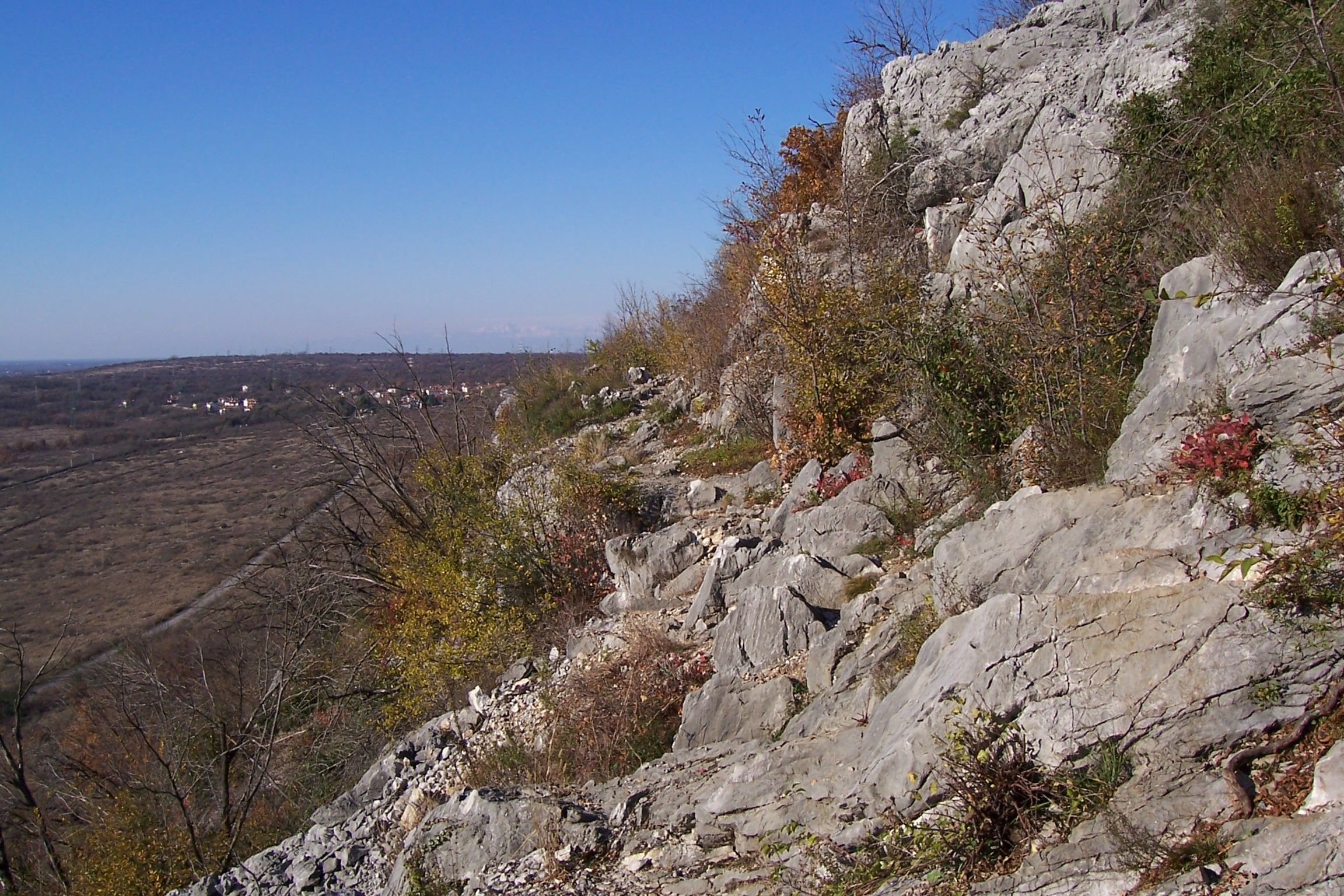
Karst landscape near Doberdò

Doberdò is the only municipality in the former Province of Gorizia that lies entirely on the Karst Plateau (Carso/Kras). As a consequence, the municipality area contains about two hundred caves, in particular Abisso Bonetti and Grotta dell'Artiglieria.

The Doberdò area has a crucial strategic position. A relatively wide and flat canyon runs right through the middle of the municipality from north to south, connecting the Vipava Valley to the Adriatic Sea. The canyon is called simply Dol (Slovene for vale). The main road between Gorizia and Trieste runs through this canyon, which is the most direct connection between the Goriška region and the seaside.

At its southern edge, the Dol Canyon widens into a typical karst polje, dominated by Lake Doberdò. The village of Doberdò is located west of Dol Canyon, on an elevated section of the Karst Plateau known as the Doberdò Karst (Carso di Doberdò, doberdobski Kras). On the east side of the Dol Canyon rises the plateau known as the Trieste and Komen Karst (tržaško-komenski Kras), which continues eastward and southward into neighboring Slovenia. Dol Canyon ends in the narrow Timavo Valley, which is already located in the neighboring municipality of Duino.

== History ==
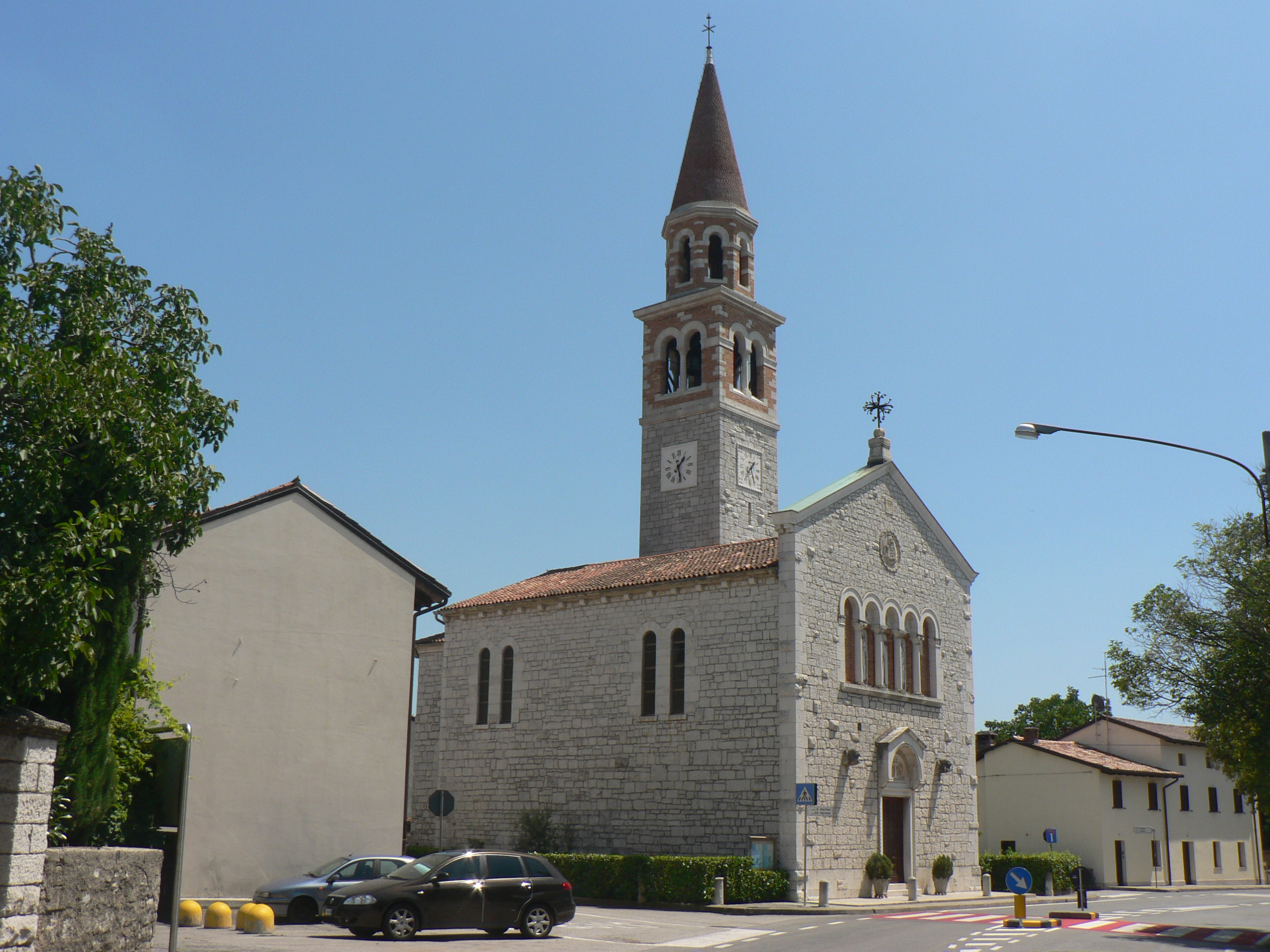
The parish church in Doberdò

The Slavic ancestors of the present-day Slovenes settled the Karst Plateau in the 7th century AD. In the Middle Ages, the village belonged to the Lombard kingdom, the Frankish Kingdom, to the Patriarchate of Aquileia, and finally to the Counts of Gorizia which acquired it in the 15th century.

The village was first mentioned in 1179 as Dobradan. This was probably a misspelling of the Slovene name Doberdob. Together with the rest of the County of Gorizia, Doberdob came under Habsburg rule in 1500, and it remained part of the Habsburg monarchy until 1918, when it was occupied and annexed to Italy.

The whole area was the scene of fierce fighting between the Austro-Hungarian and Italian armies during World War I. The village was completely destroyed during the Battles of the Isonzo. More than a fifth of the population lost their lives as a consequence of the war. Between 1922 and 1943, Doberdob was subjected to a policy of violent Fascist Italianization. During this period, the village was part of the Province of Trieste.

During World War II, the Communist-led Liberation Front of the Slovenian People organized anti-Fascist resistance in the area starting from late 1942. Many locals fought and died in the Yugoslav partisan units. The village was liberated by the Yugoslav People's Army on 1 May 1945. The Yugoslavs withdrew already in June of the same year, and they were replaced by the Anglo-American Military administration. In September 1947, the village was reincorporated into Italy, and it was included in the Province of Gorizia.

Between the mid-1950s and the late 1980s, Doberdob was one of the electoral strongholds of the Italian Communist Party, although a significant proportion of the electorate also supported the Slovene Union, the centrist party of the Slovenes in Italy. Since the 1990s, the vast majority of the population has supported one of the left-wing political parties.

== Culture and education ==
The village has a state-run preschool, elementary school, and high school, all of them with Slovene as the language of instruction. The elementary school is named after the Slovenian writer Prežihov Voranc, while the high school is named after Ivan Trinko, a Slovene bishop, author and minority rights activist from Friulian Slovenia.

Most locals speak the Karst dialect of Slovene.

There are many cultural and civic associations in the municipality.

== Symbolic place of WWI ==
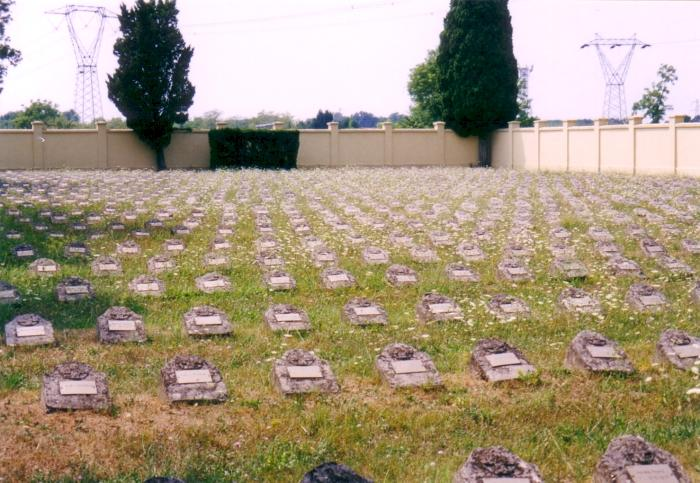
Austro-Hungarian military cemetery in Doberdò

During World War I, the village was the scene of the Battle of Doberdò. Since many Slovene soldiers fought in the battle as soldiers of the Austro-Hungarian Army. A popular war song Doberdob with the verse "Doberdob, slovenskih fantov grob" ("Doberdò, the grave of Slovene lads"), made the name of the village known all across the Slovene Lands. In 1940, the Slovene writer Prežihov Voranc chose the name of the village as the title for one of his best-known novels, Doberdob (subtitled: "The War Novel of the Slovene People"). With this novel, Doberdò became the central symbolic place of the Slovene victims in World War I.

Doberdò is also a symbolic place for the Hungarians, since many of them died in the battle fighting in the Austro-Hungarian Army. In Hungary, there is a popular war song with the name Doberdó, reminiscent of this battle, what they fought very far from their home.

In May 2009, a chapel commemorating the Hungarian victims of the Battles of the Isonzo was inaugurated in the hamlet of Visintini (Slovene: Vižintini) with a trilingual, Italian-Hungarian-Slovene inscription.

== People ==
Notable people that were born or lived in Doberdò del Lago include:

- Milko Brezigar (1886–1958), Slovene and Yugoslav liberal economist
- Josip Ferfolja (1880–1958), Slovene lawyer and Social Democratic politician
- Giorgio Ursi (a.k.a. Jurij Uršič) (1943–1982), racing cyclist

== Twin towns ==
- Bled, Slovenia, since 1998
- Prvačina, Slovenia, since 1977
- Újfehértó, Hungary

== See also ==
- Julian March
- Gorizia and Gradisca
- Slovene minority in Italy
