= St. Ursula's Church =

St. Ursula's Church may refer to:

- St. Ursula's Church, Vienna, Innere Stadt, Austria
- St. Ursula's Church, Kouvola, Finland
- St Ursula's Church, Krettnach, Konz, Germany
- St Ursula's Church, Bern, Switzerland
- St. Ursula's Church, The Valley, United Kingdom
- Basilica of St. Ursula, Cologne, Germany
