= Typhlotrechus =

Scientific classification
- Kingdom: Animalia
- Phylum: Arthropoda
- Class: Insecta
- Order: Coleoptera
- Suborder: Adephaga
- Family: Carabidae
- Subfamily: Trechinae
- Genus: Typhlotrechus; J. Muhler, 1913

Genus of beetles

Typhlotrechus is a genus of blind beetles in the family Carabidae, containing the following species:

- Typhlotrechus bilimekii Sturm, 1847
- Typhlotrechus velebiticus Ganglbauer, 1904
