= Lago di Doberdò =

Lake in Italy

Lake Doberdò
- Lago di Doberdò (Italian); Doberdobsko jezero (Slovene)
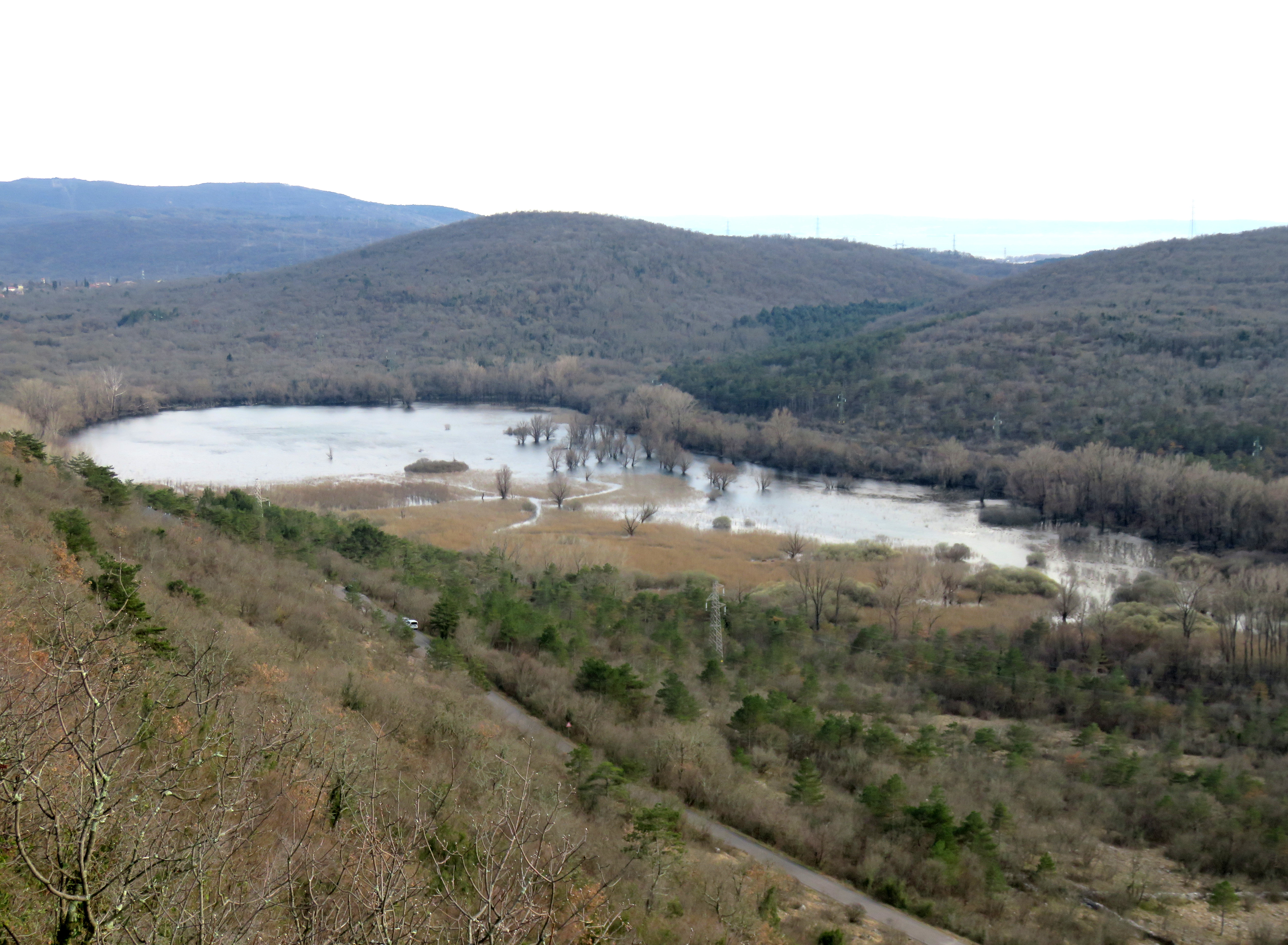

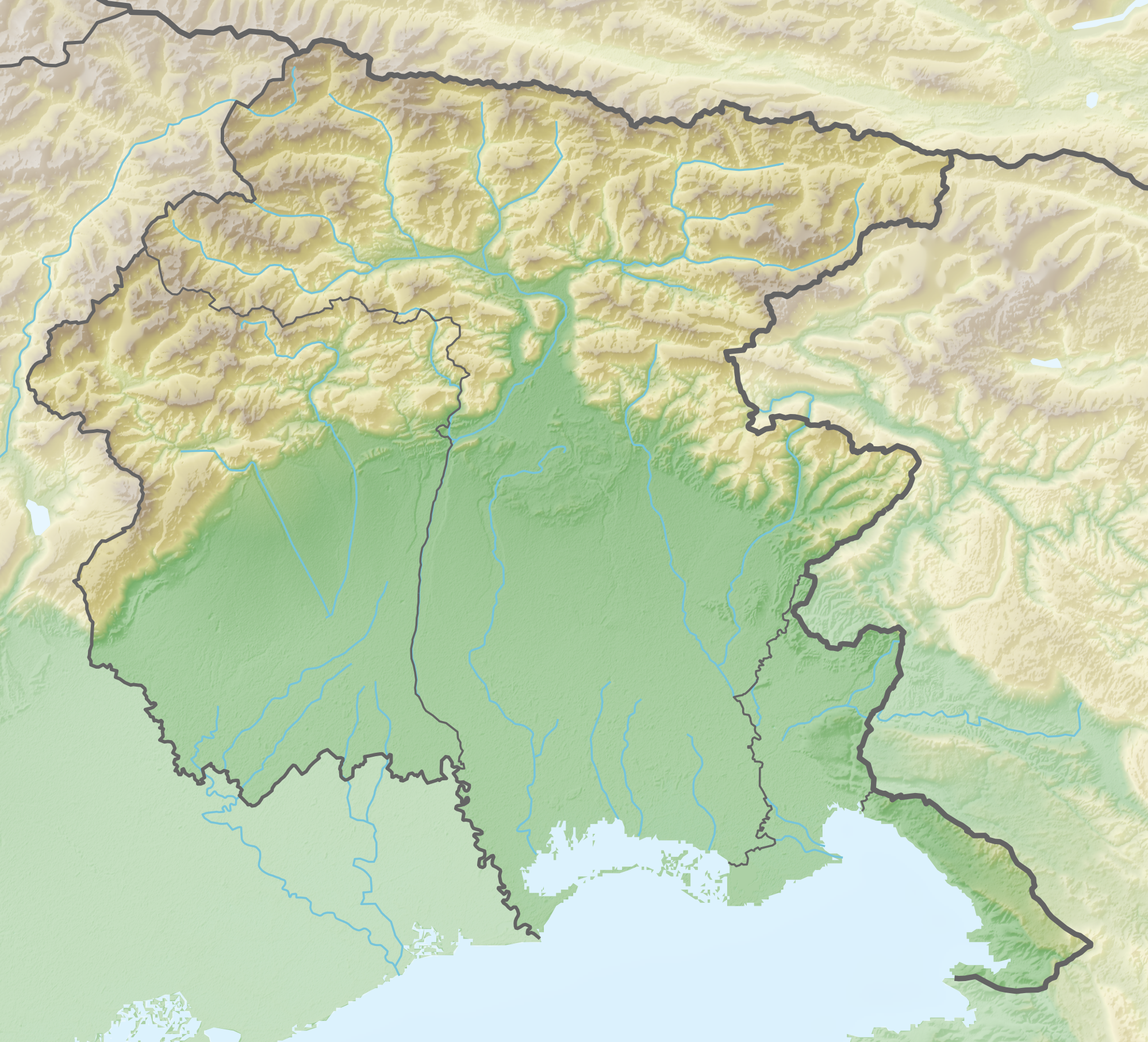
- Location within Friuli-Venezia Giulia
- Location: Province of Gorizia, Friuli-Venezia Giulia
- Coordinates: 45°50′N 13°34′E
- Basin countries: Italy
- Water volume: 1,300,000 m^{3} (46,000,000 cu ft)

Lake Doberdò (Italian: Lago di Doberdò, Slovene: Doberdobsko jezero) is the name of a sinkhole in the Province of Gorizia, Friuli-Venezia Giulia, Italy. It is located on the westernmost edge of the Karst (Italian: Carso, Slovene: Kras) plateau, close to the border with Slovenia. It is named after the village of Doberdò del Lago (Slovene: Doberdob).

== Overview ==
It has an area of approximately 0.36 km^{2}, depending on the time of year, and it is located around 2 km southwest of the village of Doberdò, not far from the Adriatic coast. The water is filtered through various ponors, and it is connected with the springs feeding the Timavo River, which are located a few kilometers southeast. The depth varies from 5 to 10 m. The lake is usually largest in autumn, when it is 1.2 km long and 350 m wide. During the frequent drought periods, the lake almost completely disappears, becoming a marsh-like area.
