= Municipality of Ravne na Koroškem =

Municipality of Slovenia

Municipality of Ravne na Koroškem Občina Ravne na Koroškem
- Municipality
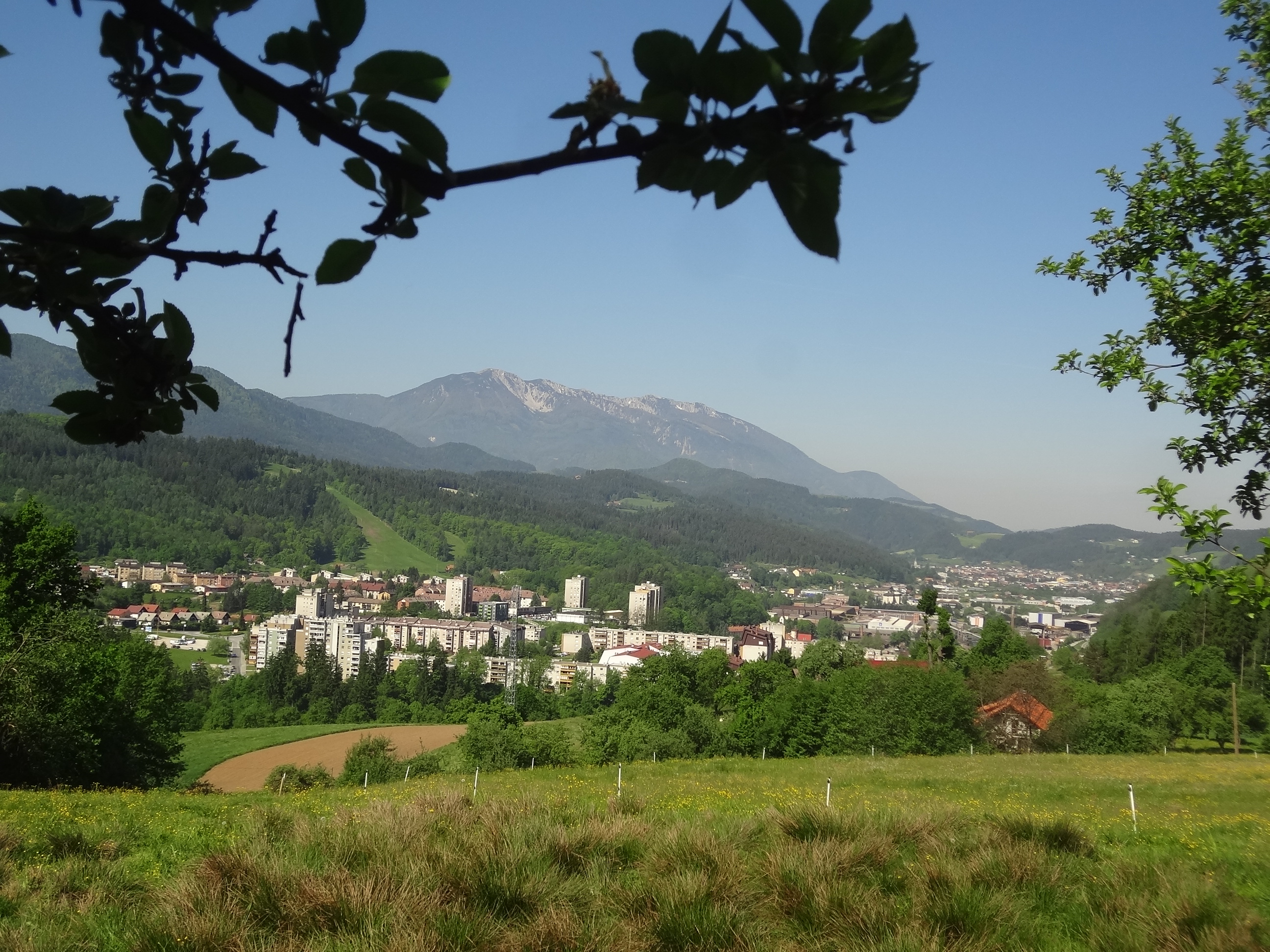

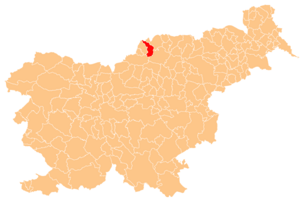
- Location of the Municipality of Ravne na Koroškem in Slovenia
- Coordinates: 46°33′N 14°58′E
- Country: Slovenia

Government
  - Mayor: Tomaž Rožen

Area
  - Total: 63.4 km^{2} (24.5 sq mi)

Population (2018)
  - Total: 11,241
  - Density: 177/km^{2} (459/sq mi)
- Time zone: UTC+01 (CET)
  - Summer (DST): UTC+02 (CEST)
- Website: www.ravne.si

The Municipality of Ravne na Koroškem (Slovene: Občina Ravne na Koroškem) is a municipality in the traditional region of Carinthia in northern Slovenia. The seat of the municipality is the town of Ravne na Koroškem. Ravne na Koroškem became a municipality in 1994. It borders Austria.

== Settlements ==
In addition to the municipal seat of Ravne na Koroškem, the municipality also includes the following settlements:

- Brdinje
- Dobrije
- Koroški Selovec
- Kotlje
- Navrški Vrh
- Podgora
- Podkraj
- Preški Vrh
- Sele
- Stražišče
- Strojna
- Tolsti Vrh pri Ravnah na Koroškem
- Uršlja Gora
- Zelen Breg
