= Podgora, Ravne na Koroškem =

Podgora
- Location in Slovenia
- Coordinates: 46°30′45.91″N 14°58′20.59″E
- Country: Slovenia
- Traditional region: Carinthia
- Statistical region: Carinthia
- Municipality: Ravne na Koroškem

Area
  - Total: 9.8 km^{2} (3.8 sq mi)
- Elevation: 567.5 m (1,862 ft)

Population (2002)
  - Total: 303

Podgora (pronounced [pɔdˈɡɔːɾa]) is a dispersed settlement in the hills south of Kotlje in the Municipality of Ravne na Koroškem in the Carinthia region in northern Slovenia.

== Church ==
The local church in the western part of the settlement is dedicated to Saints Hermagoras and Fortunatus and belongs to the Parish of Kotlje. It was built in the late 15th century and extended in the 18th century.

== Notable people ==
Notable people that were born or lived in Podgora include:

- Prežihov Voranc (1893–1950), a writer
