= Battle of Doberdò =

Battle in August 1916 between the Kingdom of Italy and Austria-Hungary

Coordinates: 45°50′5″N 13°32′57″E

- Part of the Italian Front of the First World War
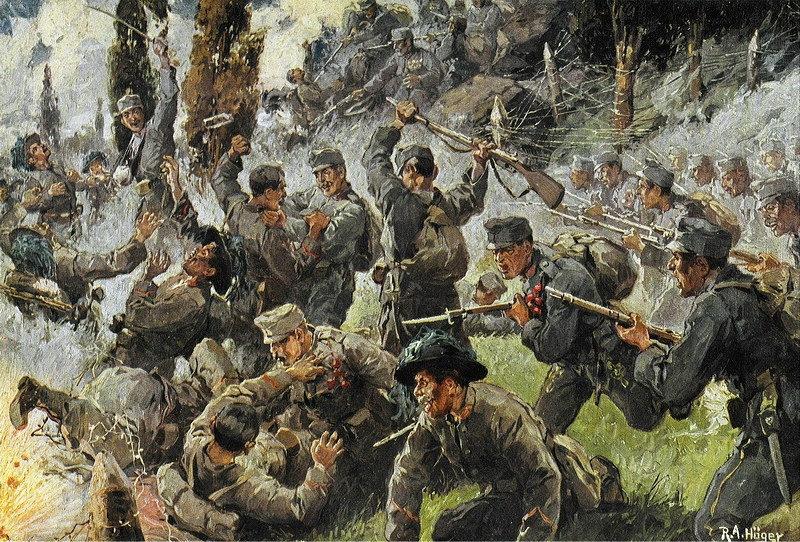
- Depiction of the Battle of Doberdò.
Date	6 August 1916
Location	Gorizia - Doberdò del Lago, Italy
Result	Italian victory

Belligerents
Italy	Austria-Hungary

Commanders and leaders
(Kingdom of Italy) Luigi Cadorna (Kingdom of Italy) Settimio Piacentini (Kingdom of Italy) Prince Emanuele Filiberto	(Austria-Hungary) Conrad von Hötzendorf (Austria-Hungary) Svetozar Boroević

Units involved
(Kingdom of Italy) 2nd Army (Kingdom of Italy) 3rd Army	(Austria-Hungary) 5th Army

Casualties and losses
6,000 casualties	9,300 casualties

The Battle of Doberdò took place near Doberdò del Lago (Slovene: Doberdob) in August 1916 between armies of Kingdom of Italy and Austria-Hungary. The Austro-Hungarian army was primarily made up of regiments filled with Hungarians and Slovenians. The battle was a part of the sixth battle of the Isonzo, and occurred in a strategic area of westernmost edge of the Karst Plateau. Italians had already conquered the lowland area surrounding Monfalcone and Ronchi, and attempted to push over the Karst Plateau to seize control of the major road that linked the city of Trieste and its port with Gorizia. After fierce combat, and sustained heavy casualties, Italian forces forced Austro-Hungarian forces to retreat and captured Gorizia.

== Battle ==
Before the battle, Austro-Hungarians shifted forces from the Isonzo front to other parts of the war. Lack of Austro-Hungarian soldiers in the region resulted in Italian general Luigi Cadorna deciding to attack the river. Fighting started on 6 August, with Italian forces, led by general Luigi Capello, assaulting Austro-Hungarian positions guarding the main transport road between Duino and Gorizia. Seizing the transport road would secure southern approach to Gorizia. Capello drafted a plan to split his forces in half, with one attacking the Austro-Hungarian positions head-on, and the other flanking them to the rear. On morning of 6 August, Austro-Hungarian artillery began shelling Italian infantry as they were approaching. As planned, four divisions of Italian forces began with a frontal assault, which resulted in huge casualties due to heavy machine gun fire. Italians managed to break through the Austro-Hungarian lines with new reinforcements, eventually seizing the village of Doberdò itself. By this time, the Austro-Hungarian forces needed reinforcements desperately in order to prevent further Italian advances. The other portion of the Italian forces commenced their assault from the rear, and started hand-to-hand fighting with heavy losses on both sides. The now-surrounded Austro-Hungarian army was forced into retreat.

== Results ==
Both armies took heavy losses, with roughly 20,000 men killed or missing. Although Italians had secured their objective, their loses were significant, with roughly 5,000 men dead due to frontal assaults on superior enemy defenses and the Austro-Hungarians' use of chemical weapons. Italian military leaders remained eager to destroy Austro-Hungarian presence in the area, desiring to push to Ljubljana, while their Austro-Hungarian counterparts desired to preserve their men, as they had to fight against both Italy and Russia, giving them two fronts to fight on. Their desire to preserve their men gave the Austro-Hungarians fewer soldiers to defend their borders with Italy and Russia. The battle was strategically significant for Italy despite the numerous losses on both sides. The Italian army gained territory around a front that stretched 20 kilometers.
