= Kotlje =

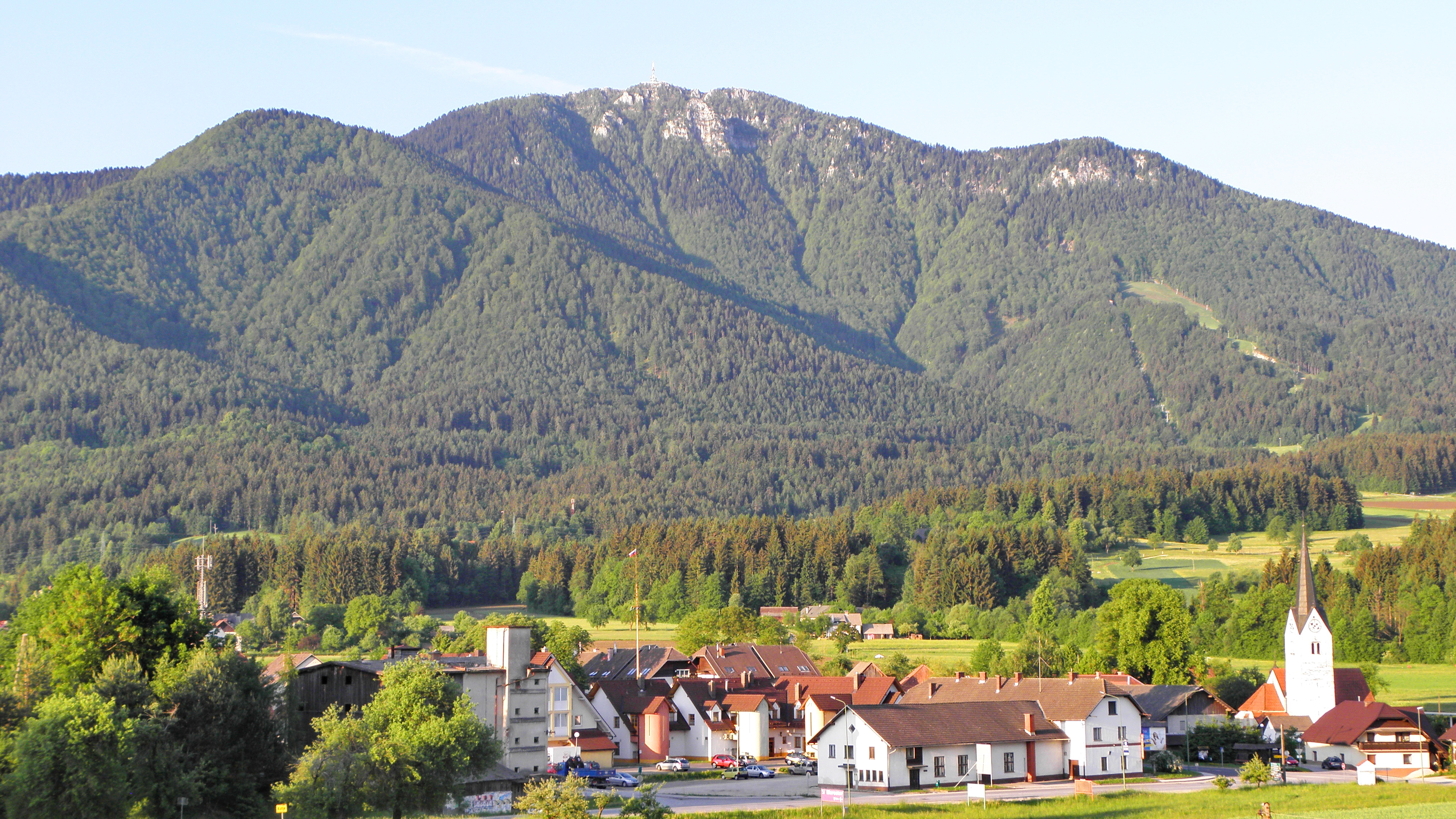

- Location in Slovenia
- Coordinates: 46°31′11.5″N 14°59′2.33″E
- Country: Slovenia
- Traditional region: Carinthia
- Statistical region: Carinthia
- Municipality: Ravne na Koroškem

Area
  - Total: 0.965 km^{2} (0.373 sq mi)
- Elevation: 452.4 m (1,484 ft)

Population (2018)
  - Total: 1,085
  - Density: 1.125/km^{2} (2.91/sq mi)

Kotlje (pronounced [ˈkɔːtljɛ]) is a village in the hills south of Ravne na Koroškem in the Carinthia region in northern Slovenia. Kotlje is described in some of the works by the writer Prežihov Voranc.

== Church ==
The parish church in the village is dedicated to Saint Margaret and belongs to the Roman Catholic Archdiocese of Maribor. It was first mentioned in written documents dating to 1367, but has been rebuilt and expanded a number of times.

== Notable people ==
Notable people that were born or lived in Kotlje include:

- Alojzij Kuhar (1895–1958), conservative politician and diplomat, brother of Prežihov Voranc
