= Ravne na Koroškem =

Ravne na Koroškem Guštanj (until 1952)
- Town
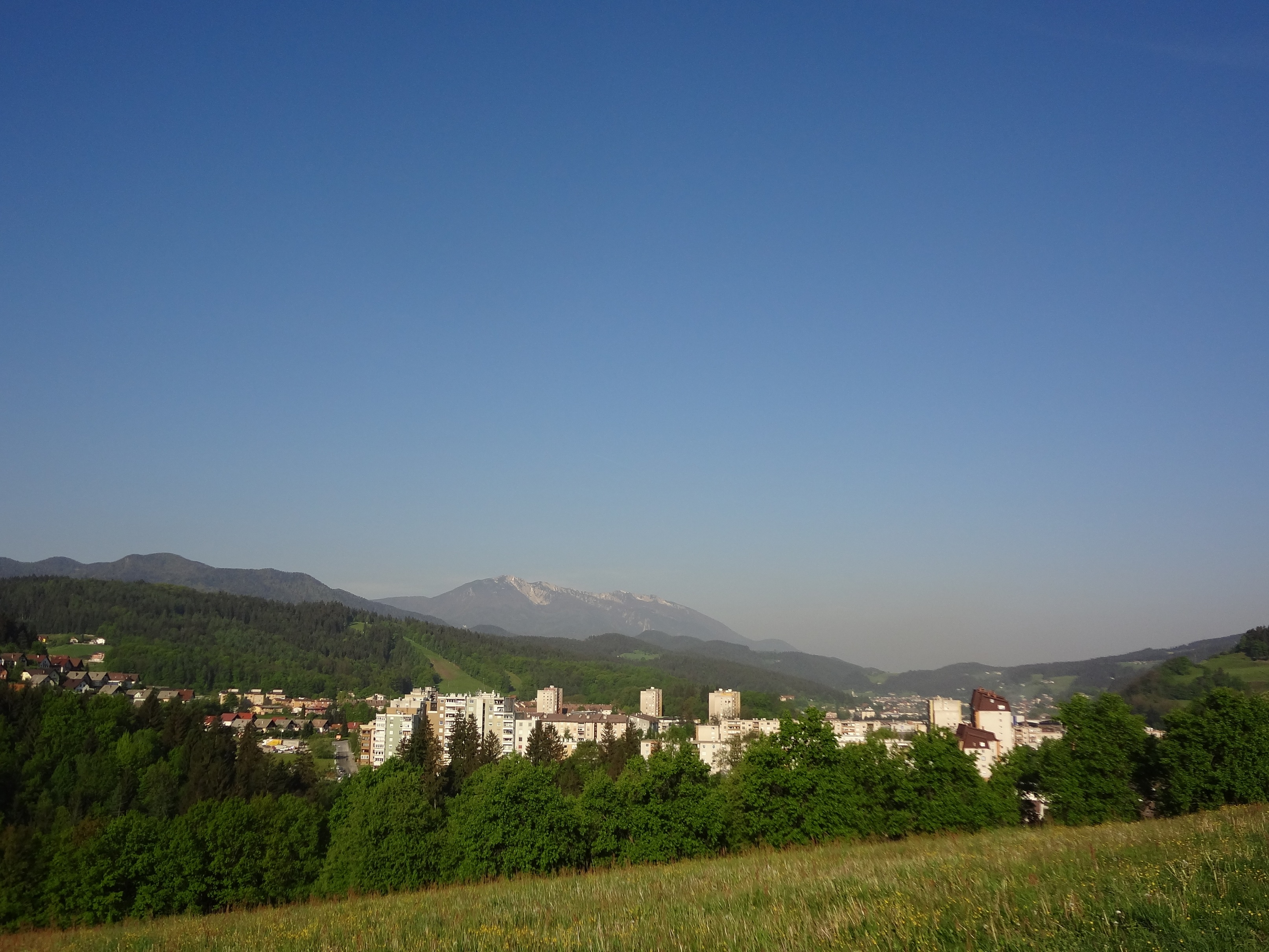
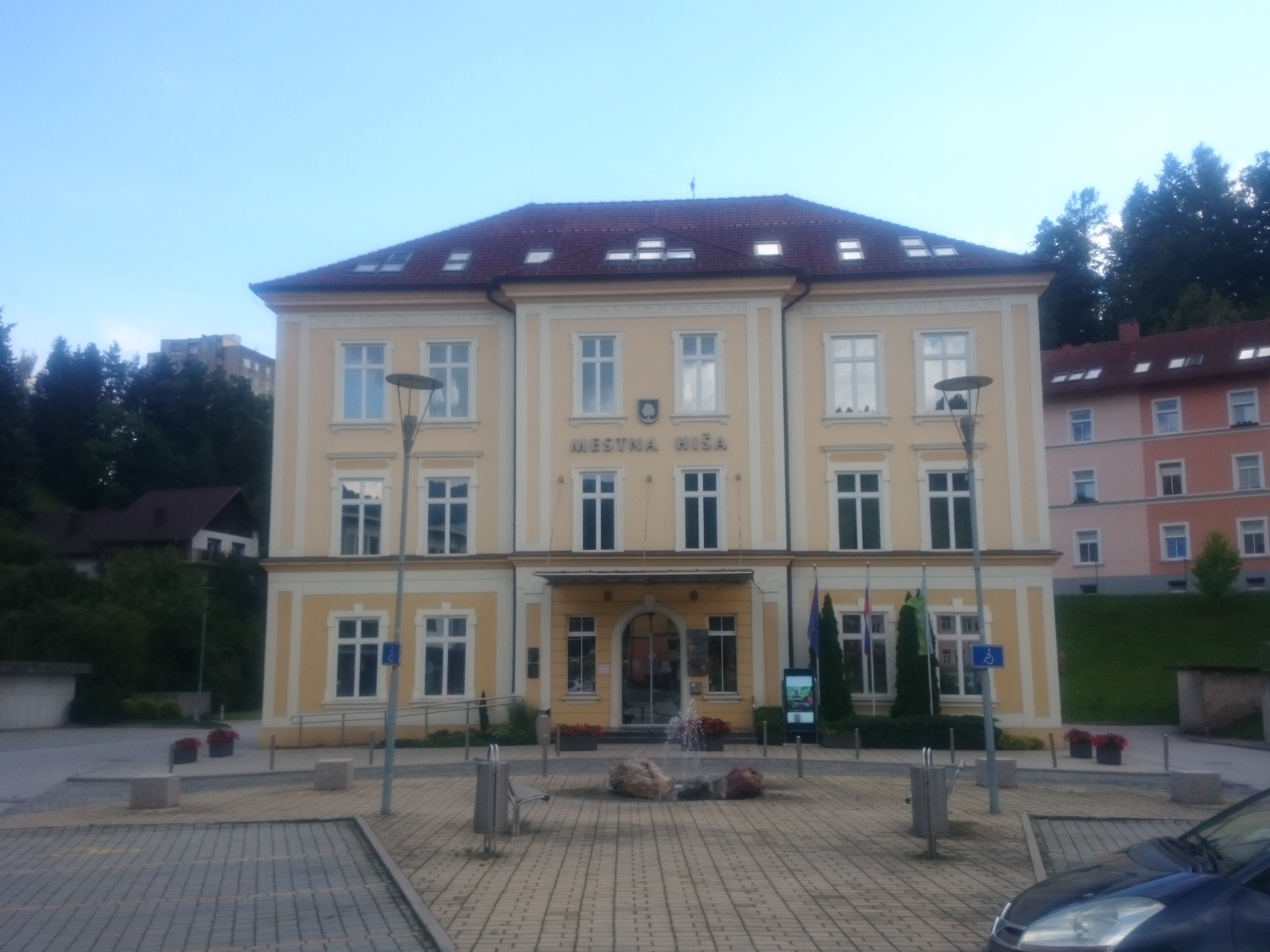
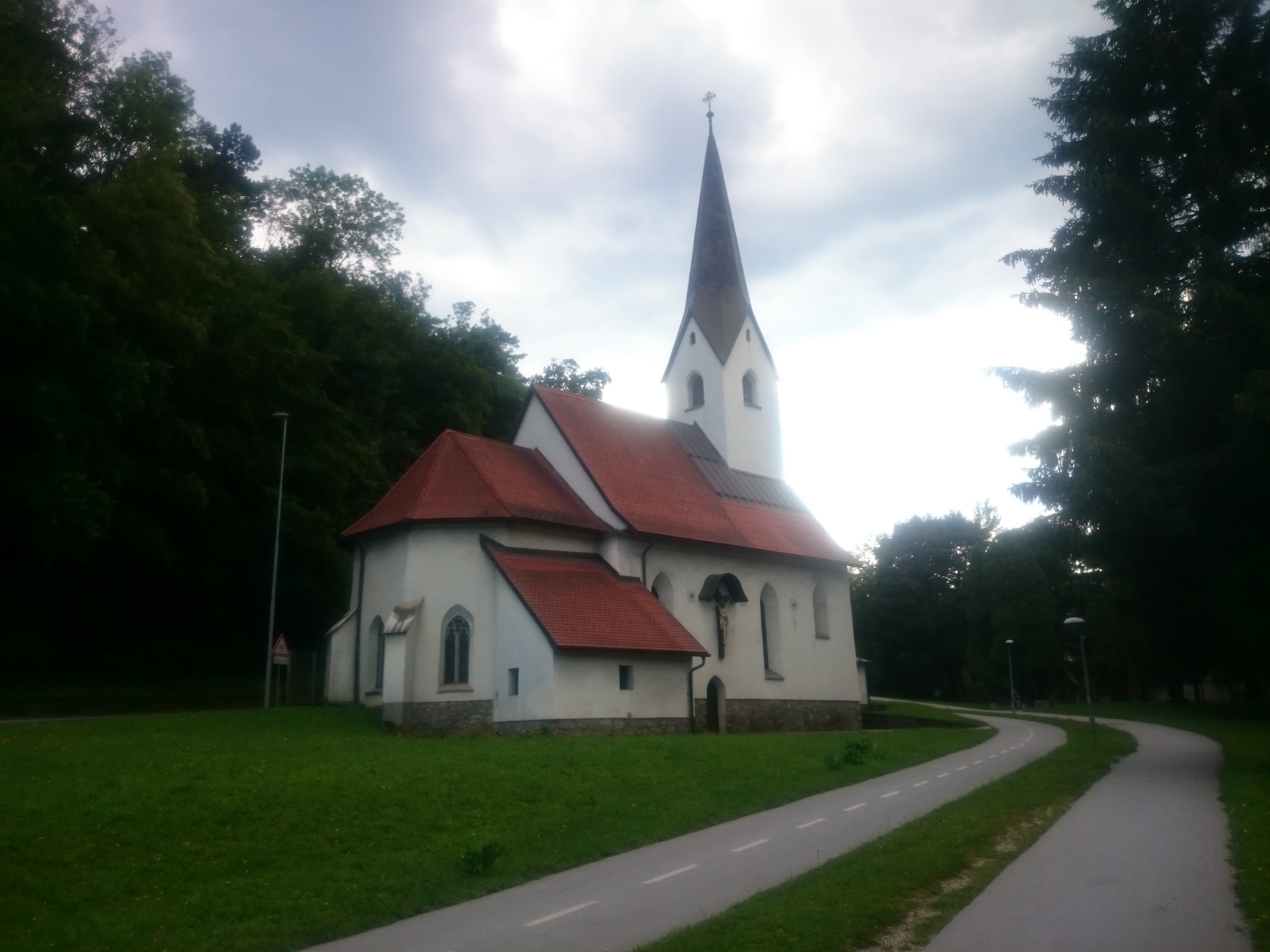
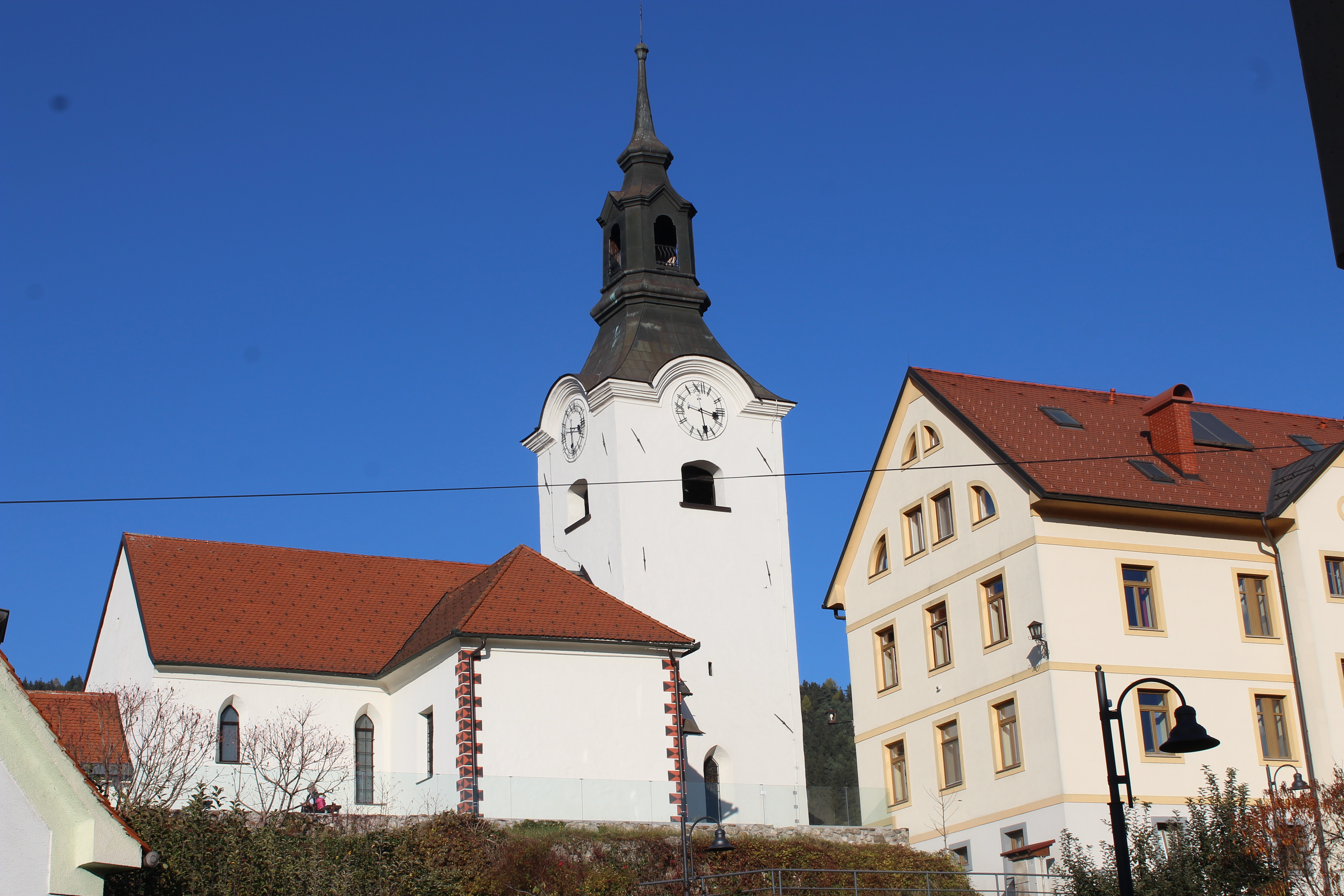
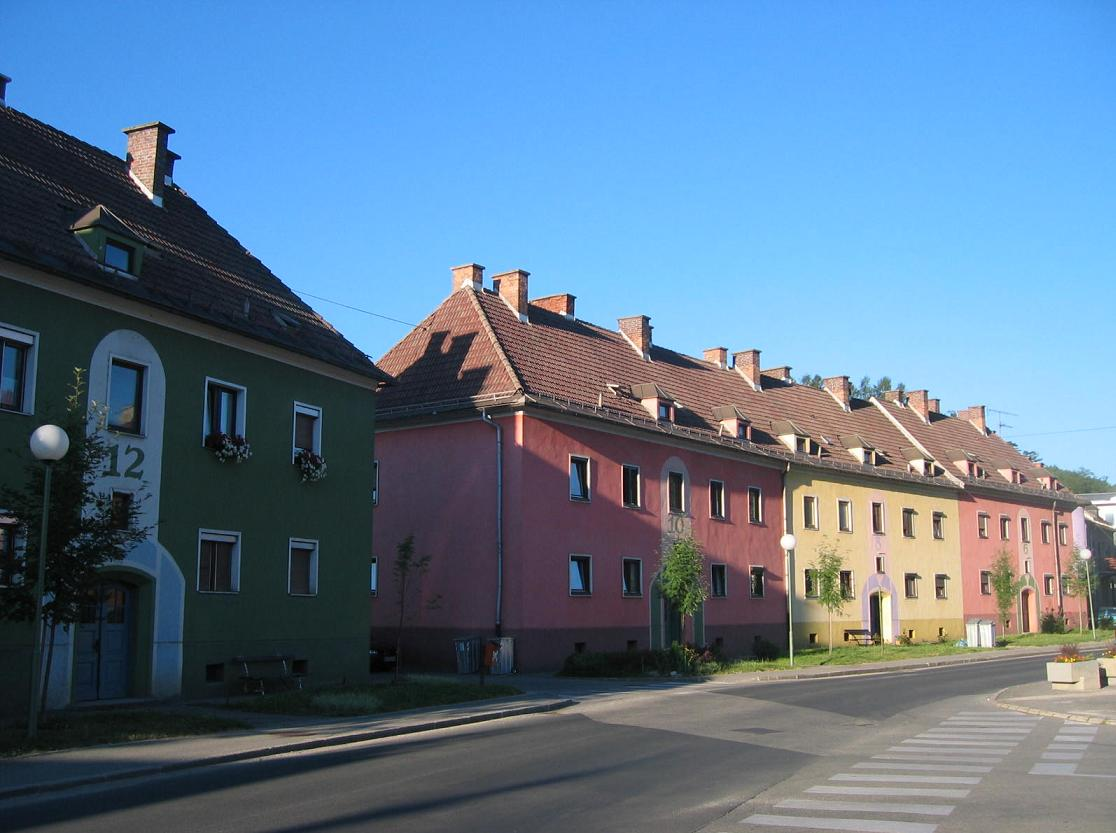
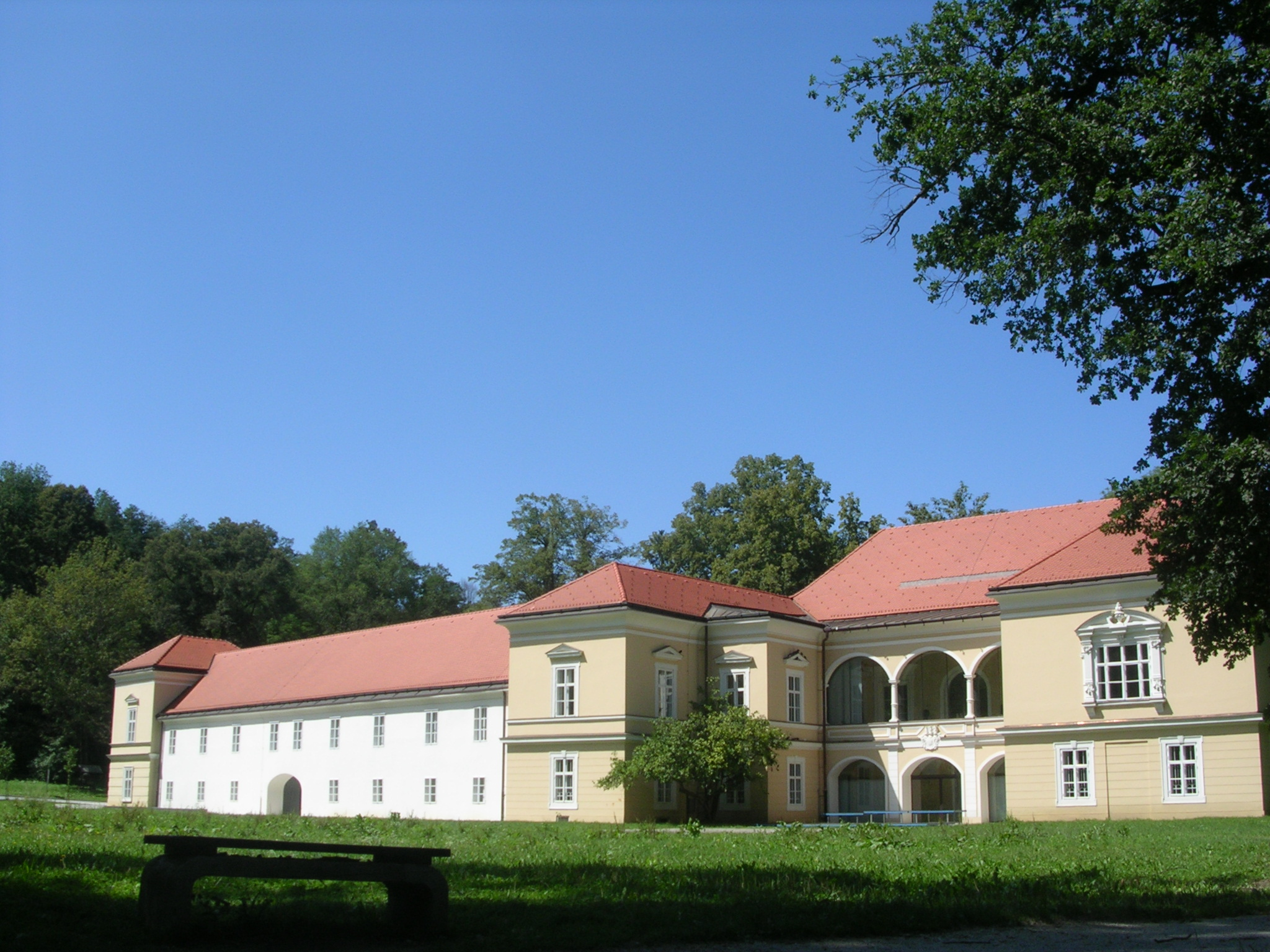
- From top, left to right: Panorama of the town, Town Hall, St. Anthony's Church, St. Giles' Church, Town houses, Ravne Castle

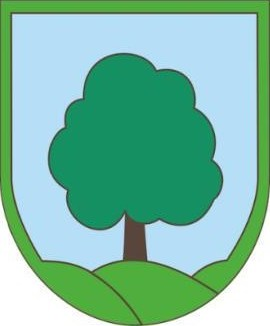
- Coat of arms

- Location in Slovenia
- Coordinates: 46°32′37.45″N 14°57′51.24″E
- Country: Slovenia
- Traditional region: Carinthia
- Statistical region: Carinthia
- Municipality: Ravne na Koroškem

Area
  - Land: 3.049 km^{2} (1.177 sq mi)
- Elevation: 410 m (1,350 ft)

Population (2018)
  - Total: 7,268
  - Density: 2,384/km^{2} (6,170/sq mi)
- Vehicle registration: SG

Ravne na Koroškem (pronounced [ˈɾàːwnɛ na kɔˈɾóːʃkɛm]; until 1952: Guštanj; German: Gutenstein in Kärnten) is a town in northern Slovenia. It is the seat of the Municipality of Ravne na Koroškem, and the largest town and the capital of Slovenia's Carinthia region. The town has a long tradition in the steel industry.

== Name ==
The name Ravne na Koroškem literally means 'Ravne in Carinthia'. The word ravne means 'flat terrain' in Slovene, and is a common place name in Slovene-inhabited territories. The name of the settlement was changed from Guštanj (from German Gutenstein) to Ravne na Koroškem in 1952 on the basis of the 1948 Law on Names of Settlements and Designations of Squares, Streets, and Buildings as part of efforts by Slovenia's postwar communist government to remove German elements from toponyms.

== History ==
Part of the Duchy of Carinthia from 976, King Henry II of Germany granted the area to the Bishops of Bamberg in 1007. The settlement was first mentioned as Gutenstain in a 1263 deed.

Ravne na Koroškem was granted town status in 1952. The history of the steel industry in the town goes back more than 400 years.

== Church ==
The parish church in the settlement is dedicated to Saint Giles and belongs to the Roman Catholic Archdiocese of Maribor. It is first mentioned in written documents dating to 1331. It was re-vaulted in the 17th century.

== Culture ==
Ravne na Koroškem is also known for excellent jazz. Concerts of the Jazz Ravne cycle are held throughout the year and the Festival of Slovenian Jazz takes place each autumn.

== In fiction ==
One of Nostradamus's quatrains that is localized to southeast Europe has the following couplet:

"Cry sera grand par toute Escalvonie
Lors naistra monstre pres & dedans Ravenne"

which translates to

A cry will be great across Esclavonia
when will be born the monster in and near Ravenne

Mario Reading translates the third line as "throughout enslaved-Slovenia," finding no other meaning and stipulates that the town will be either the conception or birthplace of the third and last Antichrist. He interprets the first lines as indicating "bad luck will come to those countries abutting the place"—Baleni Romini and Dalmatia are the specific afflicted places mentioned—and ascribes the index date 2032 based on the original manuscript number 32. Mostly as a result of line three (the first line above) this place, the author considers Ravne na Koroškem the most likely of the three places named Ravenne in Europe that unwittingly hosts the creation of this globally inhumane person.

Historical population
Year	Pop.	±%
1948	2,401	—
1953	3,816	+58.9%
1961	5,323	+39.5%
1971	6,686	+25.6%
1981	8,127	+21.6%
1991	8,887	+9.4%
2002	7,797	−12.3%
2011	6,979	−10.5%
2021	7,254	+3.9%
Population size may be affected by changes in administrative divisions.

== Gallery ==
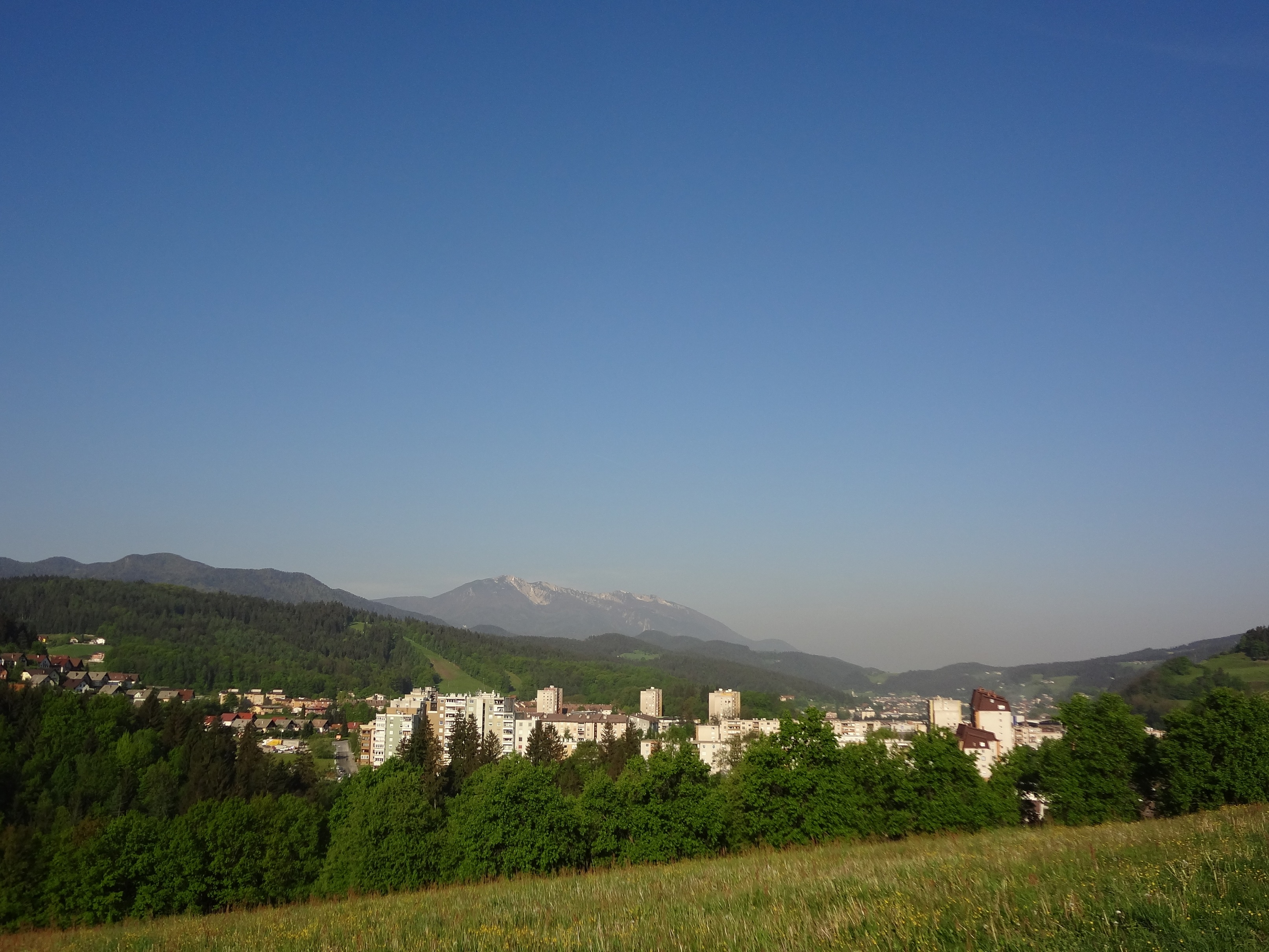
Ravne na Koroškem and Mount Peca

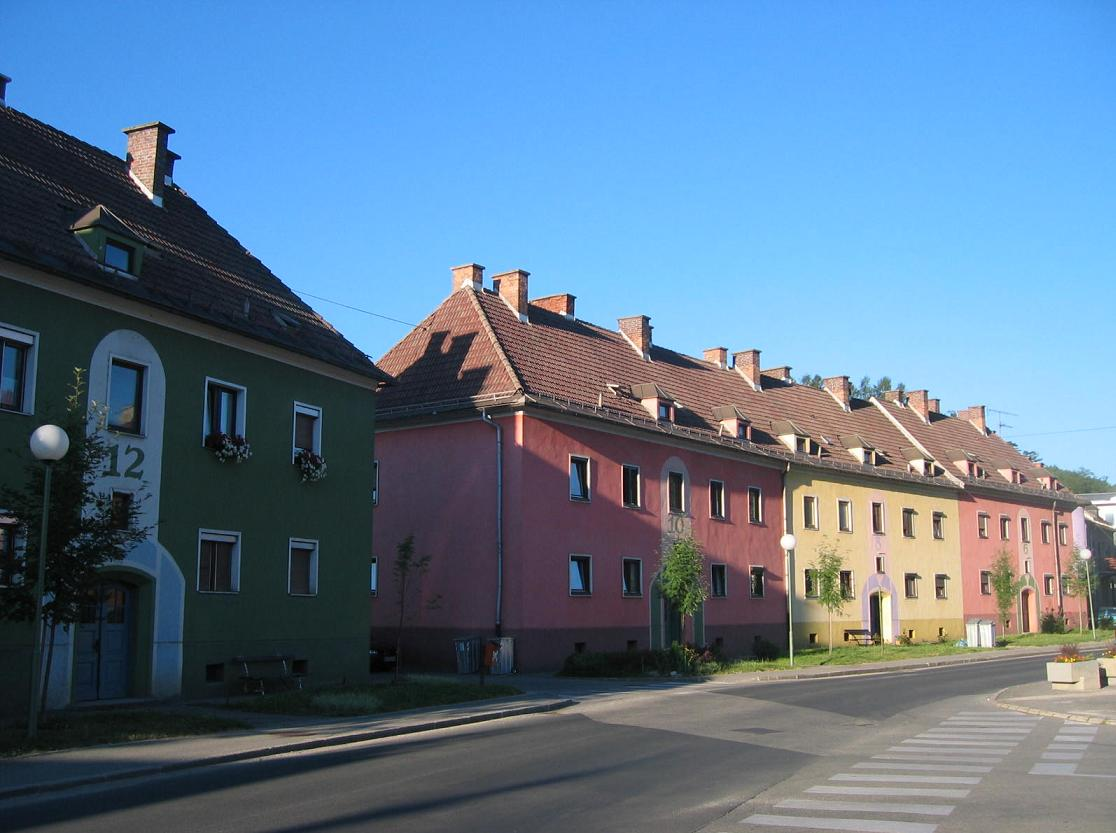
Prežih Street (Prežihova ulica)

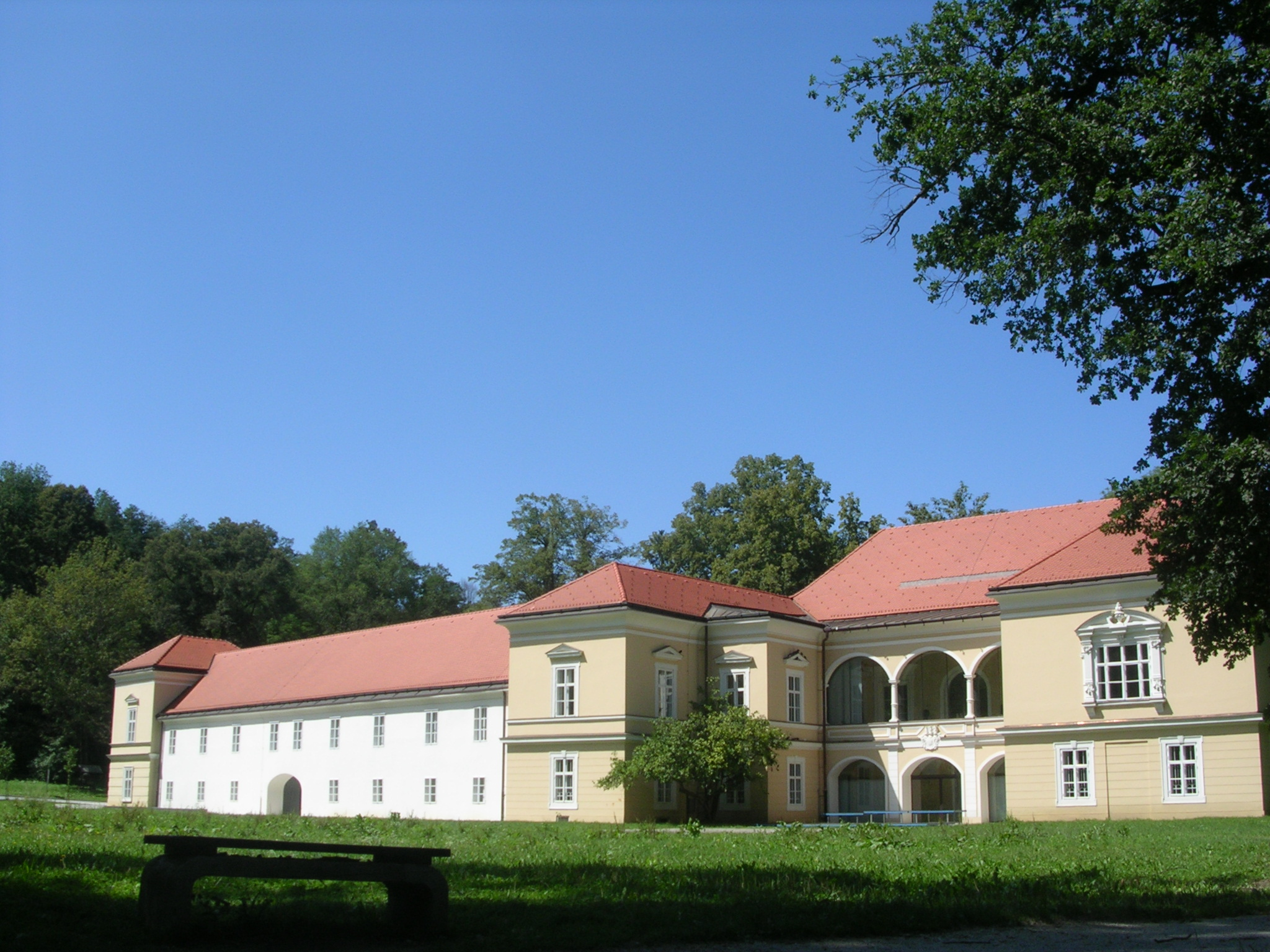
Ravne Mansion, Castle Park

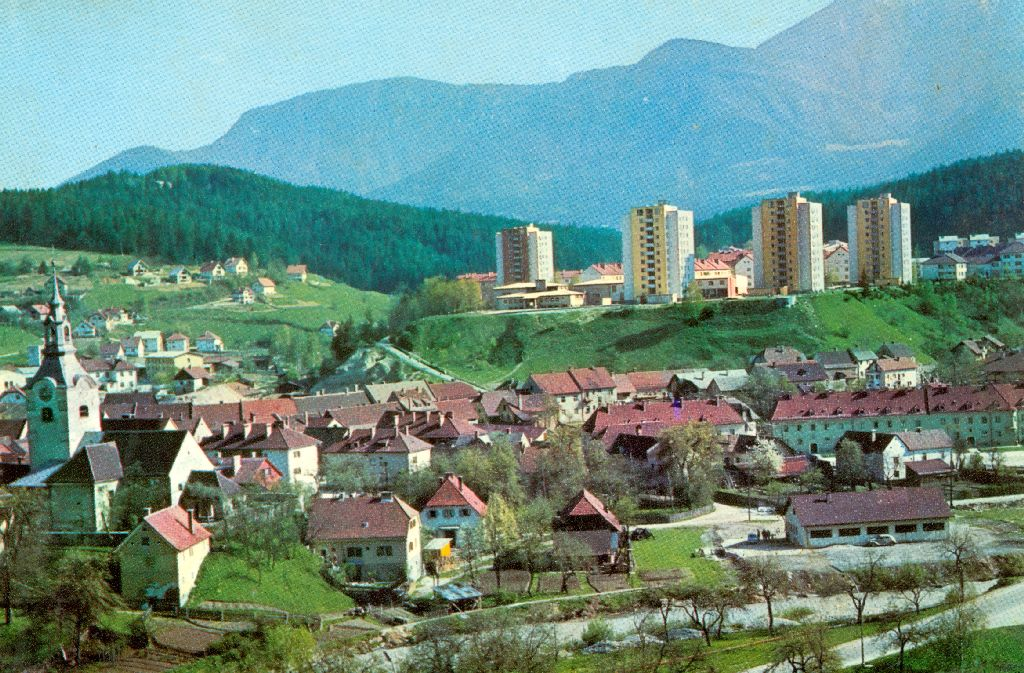
Postcard of Ravne na Koroškem, 1967

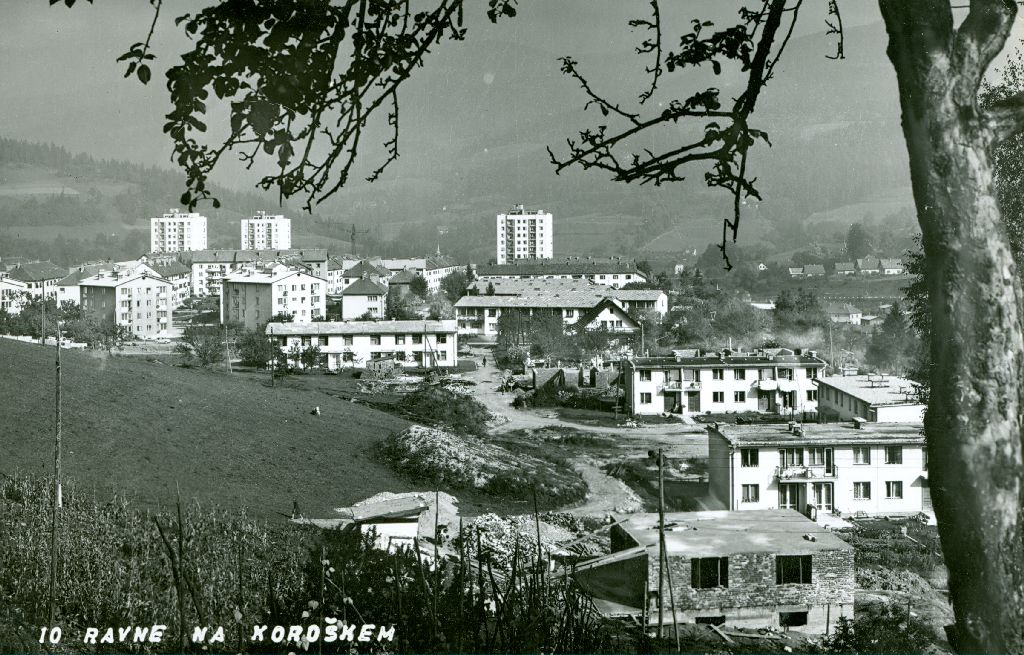
Postcard of Ravne na Koroškem, 1955
