= Jamnica, Prevalje =

Jamnica Zgornja Jamnica (1955–1998)
- Location in Slovenia
- Coordinates: 46°35′43.66″N 14°52′35.1″E
- Country: Slovenia
- Traditional region: Carinthia
- Statistical region: Carinthia
- Municipality: Prevalje

Area
  - Total: 6.04 km^{2} (2.33 sq mi)
- Elevation: 785.7 m (2,578 ft)

Population (2002)
  - Total: 71

Jamnica (pronounced [jaˈmniːtsa]) is a dispersed settlement in the hills northwest of Prevalje in the Carinthia region in northern Slovenia, right on the border with Austria.

== Name ==
The name of the settlement was changed from Jamnica to Zgornja Jamnica (literally, 'upper Jamnica') in 1955. This corresponded to the name change of Šentanel to Spodnja Jamnica (literally, 'lower Jamnica') the same year. The name Jamnica was restored in 1998.
