= Stražišče =

Stražišče may refer to:

- Stražišče, Cerknica, a small settlement in Inner Carniola, Slovenia
- Stražišče, Kranj, a former settlement in Upper Carniola, Slovenia
- Stražišče, Prevalje, a dispersed settlement in Carinthia, Slovenia
- Stražišče, Ravne na Koroškem, a dispersed settlement in Carinthia, Slovenia
