= Vojinović =

Vojinović or Vojinovic (Serbian: Војиновић) is a Serbian surname derived from a masculine given name Vojin. Notable people with the surname include:

Noble families:

- House of Vojinović (modern), Serb noble family in the Bay of Kotor and Dalmatia active in the late 18th and early 19th century
- Vojinović noble family, mediaeval Serbian noble family which during the 14th century played an important role in the Serbian Empire

Surname:

- Altoman Vojinović (fl. 1335–59), Serbian magnate who served Emperor Stefan Dušan
- Djordje Vojinović (1936–2016), American politician from the state of Ohio
- Đorđe Vojinović (1833–1895), Croatian Serb politician
- Draško Vojinović (born 1984), Serbian football player
- Kosta Vojinović (1891–1917), known as Kosovac, Serbian soldier who fought in World War I
- Lujo Vojinović (1864–1951), Serbian writer, politician, and diplomat
- Miloš Vojinović (fl. 1332), Serbian nobleman who served Emperor Stefan Dušan
- Vojislav Vojinović, 14th-century Serbian nobleman who held the title "Duke of Gacko"
- Vojislava Vojinović (1322–1347), Serb voivode (military commander, Duke) and magnate (velikaš)
- Zorica Vojinović (born 1958), former Yugoslav/Serbian Olympic handball player

== See also ==
- Vojin
- Vojnić
- Živojinović
