= Ivanic =

Ivanic may refer to:

== People ==
- Ivanić, a Serbian and Croatian surname

== Places ==
- Ivanić-Grad, a town in Moslavina, Zagreb County, Croatia

== See also ==
- Ivanics, a Hungarian surname
- Ivanovic (surname)
- Ivan
- Kloštar Ivanić, a municipality in Croatia
