= Janez Gradišnik =

Slovenian author and translator

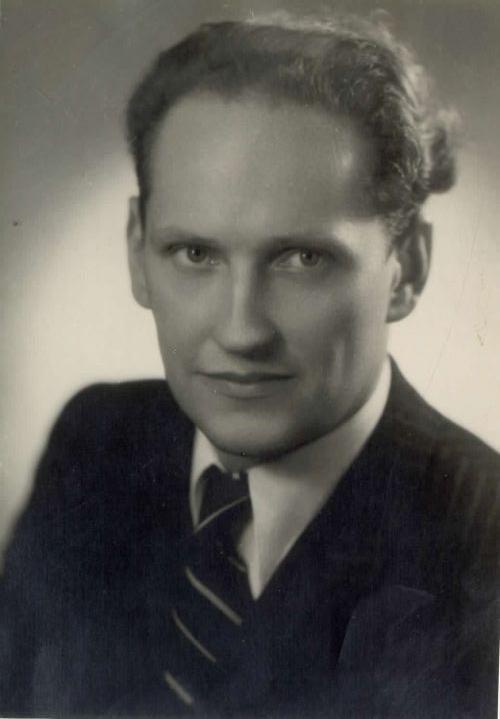
- Janez Gradišnik in 1950
- Born: September 22, 1917; Stražišče near Prevalje
- Died: March 5, 2009 (aged 91); Ljubljana
- Occupations: writer, translator
- Writing career
- Notable awards: Prešeren Award; 2008

Janez Gradišnik (22 September 1917 – 5 March 2009), was a Slovenian author and translator.

== Biography ==
He was born in Stražišče near Prevalje, present-day Slovenia, in what was then the Duchy of Carinthia in the Austro-Hungarian Empire. He studied at the University of Ljubljana. In the late 1930s and 1940s, he belonged to the Christian left intellectual circle of Edvard Kocbek. During World War II, he was arrested by the Nazi German authorities and expelled to Croatia. Between 1941 and 1945, he lived in exile in Bjelovar. In March 1945, the Ustaša (Croatian Fascists) arrested him, and he spent the last months of the war imprisoned in Zagreb.

After the war, he shortly worked as the secretary of Edvard Kocbek, who was named Yugoslav Minister for Slovenia in Belgrade. After returning to Slovenia, he became the editor of the State Publishing House of Slovenia (Državna založba Slovenije), but was forced to resign in 1952, when Kocbek was removed from public life. After that, Gradišnik dedicated himself mostly to translations. Together with Janko Moder, he was considered the foremost Slovene translator of the second half of the 20th century.

He translated from German, English, French, Russian, Serbian, and Croatian into Slovene. He translated works by Jules Verne, Vercors, Jack London, Ernest Hemingway, Norman Hunter, Sinclair Lewis, John Boynton Priestley, John Galsworthy, E.M. Forster, Robert Louis Stevenson, Dobrica Ćosić, André Malraux, Walter de la Mare, Thomas Mann, Mark Twain, Thornton Wilder, George Eliot, Graham Greene, Robert Musil, Thomas Wolfe, Rudyard Kipling, Aldous Huxley, Heinrich Böll, James Joyce, Laurence Sterne, Franz Kafka, Hermann Hesse, Mihail Afanasjevič Bulgakov, Henri Bergson, Albert Camus, Ernst Theodor Amadeus Hoffmann and others.

He also compiled several dictionaries, most notably a Slovene-German one, and wrote short stories and literature for children.

In 2008 he received the Prešeren Award for his lifetime of work in literature, translation, writing, and linguistics.

His son Branko Gradišnik is also a prominent translator, humorist, and short story writer.

He died on 5 March 2009 in Ljubljana.
