= Stražišče, Prevalje =

Stražišče
- Location in Slovenia
- Coordinates: 46°33′15.05″N 14°56′12.62″E
- Country: Slovenia
- Traditional region: Carinthia
- Statistical region: Carinthia
- Municipality: Prevalje

Area
  - Total: 1.8 km^{2} (0.69 sq mi)
- Elevation: 550 m (1,800 ft)

Population (2015)
  - Total: 148

Stražišče (pronounced [stɾaˈʒiːʃtʃɛ]) is a dispersed settlement in the hills northeast of Prevalje in the Carinthia region in northern Slovenia.

== History ==
Stražišče was a hamlet of Prevalje until 1999, when it became a separate settlement.

== Notable people ==
Notable people that were born or lived in Stražišče include:

- Janez Gradišnik (1917–2009), author and translator
- Tone Jeromel (born 1938), agricultural expert and technical writer
- Matija Kresnik (1821–1890), folk poet and self-educated writer
- Ludvik Viternik (1888–1973), poet and composer
