= Stanko Kotnik =

- Born: 23 June 1928; Maribor, Slovenia
- Died: 3 July 2004 (aged 76); Maribor, Slovenia
- Occupations: professor and editor
- Awards: Levstik Award; 1969 for Po domovih naših pisateljev

Stanko Kotnik (23 June 1928 – 3 July 2004) was a Slovene professor of Slavic studies who taught methods of teaching Slovene language and literature at the University of Maribor. Together with Leopold Suhodolčan he was one of the conceptors of the Reading Badge of Slovenia competition that still runs today as a motivation for primary school children in reading and literacy.

Kotnik was born in Maribor in 1928. He studied Slavic languages and literature at the University of Ljubljana and graduated in 1954. He worked as a teacher in Prevalje in Slovenian Carinthia and from 1968 to his retirement in 1988 lectured at the University of Maribor. He died in Maribor in 2004.

He won the Levstik Award in 1969 for his book Po domovih naših pisateljev (In the Homes of Our Writers).
