= Lojze Lebič =

Slovenian composer

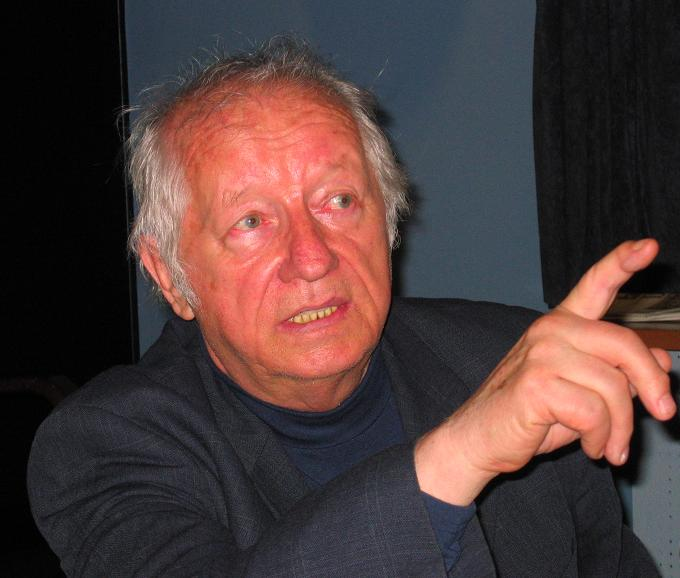
Lojze Lebič

Lojze Lebič (born 23 August 1934) is a Slovenian composer and conductor of choral and instrumental music.

== Life ==
Lebič was born on 23 August 1934 in Prevalje, in the Carinthia region of Slovenia (then part of Yugoslavia). He attended the University of Ljubljana for a bachelor's degree in archaeology and the Academy of Music in Ljubljana, where he studied with composition with Marjan Kozina and conducting with Danilo Švara. He was the youngest member of the Pro musica viva group, a group of composers based in Ljubljana that was advocated for Slovenian modernism.

== Music ==
Lebič's early style was fairly traditional, but his work from after 1965 demonstrates the influence of the European avant-garde. The opening of Slovenia to foreign travel in the 1950s and 60s allowed for greater musical and cultural exchange with the rest of Yugoslavia and Europe, encouraging the development of a Slovenian avant garde. Lebič's 1965 works Meditacije za dva for viola and cello and the cantata Požgana trava are examples of his use of new melodic and vocal techniques. Later, he developed a style that balanced respect for traditional culture with cosmopolitan modernism.

== Works ==
- Per Archi (Za Golala) for string orchestra (2009)
- Invocation/ à Primož Ramovš (clarinet and piano), commissioned by the University of Wisconsin-Milwaukee Libraries
- Meditacije za dva (Meditations for Two) for viola and cello (1965, revised 1972)
- Rubato per viola for viola solo (1989)
- Hvalnica svetu (In Praise of the World) for double choir, piano four-hands and percussion (1988)

== Awards ==
In 1967, he was awarded the Prešeren Award for conducting.
