= Vojin =

Vojin (Serbian: Војин) is a masculine given name or surname of Slavic origin. It may refer to:

- Vojin Bakić (1915–1992), prominent Croatian sculptor of Serbian descent
- Vojin Božović (1913–1983), Montenegrin, Yugoslav international, football player and manager
- Vojin Ćetković (born 1971), Serbian actor
- Vojin Jelić (1921–2004), Croatian Serb writer and poet
- Vojin Lazarević (born 1942), Montenegrin striker
- Vojin Menkovič (born 1982), Serbian handball player
- Vojin Popović, known as Vojvoda Vuk (1881–1916), Serbian voivode (military commander)
- Vojin Prole (born 1976), retired Serbian football goalkeeper
- Vojin Rakić (born 1967), political scientist and philosopher
- Vojin Serafimović (born 2005), Serbian footballer
- Vojvoda Vojin (1322–1347), Serb voivode (military commander, Duke) and magnate (velikaš)

== See also ==
- Vojany
- Vojens
- Vojihna
- Vojinović (disambiguation)
- Vojinovac
- Vojinović noble family
