= Kot pri Prevaljah =

- Location in Slovenia
- Coordinates: 46°30′52.92″N 14°55′17.94″E
- Country: Slovenia
- Traditional region: Carinthia
- Statistical region: Carinthia
- Municipality: Prevalje

Area
  - Total: 8.58 km^{2} (3.31 sq mi)
- Elevation: 687.6 m (2,256 ft)

Population (2002)
  - Total: 144

Kot pri Prevaljah (pronounced [ˈkoːt pɾi ˈpɾeːʋaljax]) is a dispersed settlement in the hills south of Prevalje in the Carinthia region in northern Slovenia.

== Name ==
The name of the settlement was changed from Kot to Kot pri Prevaljah in 1955.
