= Breznica, Prevalje =

Breznica
- Location in Slovenia
- Coordinates: 46°33′10.21″N 14°53′52.44″E
- Country: Slovenia
- Traditional region: Carinthia
- Statistical region: Carinthia
- Municipality: Prevalje

Area
  - Total: 4.98 km^{2} (1.92 sq mi)
- Elevation: 570.6 m (1,872 ft)

Population (2002)
  - Total: 151

Breznica (pronounced [ˈbreːznitsa]) is a dispersed settlement in the hills northwest of Prevalje in the Carinthia region in northern Slovenia.
