= Zagrad, Prevalje =

Zagrad
- Location in Slovenia
- Coordinates: 46°31′59.68″N 14°55′25.5″E
- Country: Slovenia
- Traditional region: Carinthia
- Statistical region: Carinthia
- Municipality: Prevalje

Area
  - Total: 4.17 km^{2} (1.61 sq mi)
- Elevation: 626.5 m (2,055 ft)

Population (2002)
  - Total: 169

Zagrad (pronounced [ˈzaːɡɾat]) is a dispersed settlement in the hills south of Prevalje in the Carinthia region in northern Slovenia.
