= Suhi Vrh, Prevalje =

Suhi Vrh
- Location in Slovenia
- Coordinates: 46°34′22.76″N 14°53′52.31″E
- Country: Slovenia
- Traditional region: Carinthia
- Statistical region: Carinthia
- Municipality: Prevalje

Area
  - Total: 4.91 km^{2} (1.90 sq mi)
- Elevation: 780.1 m (2,559 ft)

Population (2002)
  - Total: 94

Suhi Vrh (pronounced [ˈsuːxi ˈʋəɾx]) is a settlement in the hills north of Prevalje in the Carinthia region in northern Slovenia.
