= Rut, Tolmin =

Rut
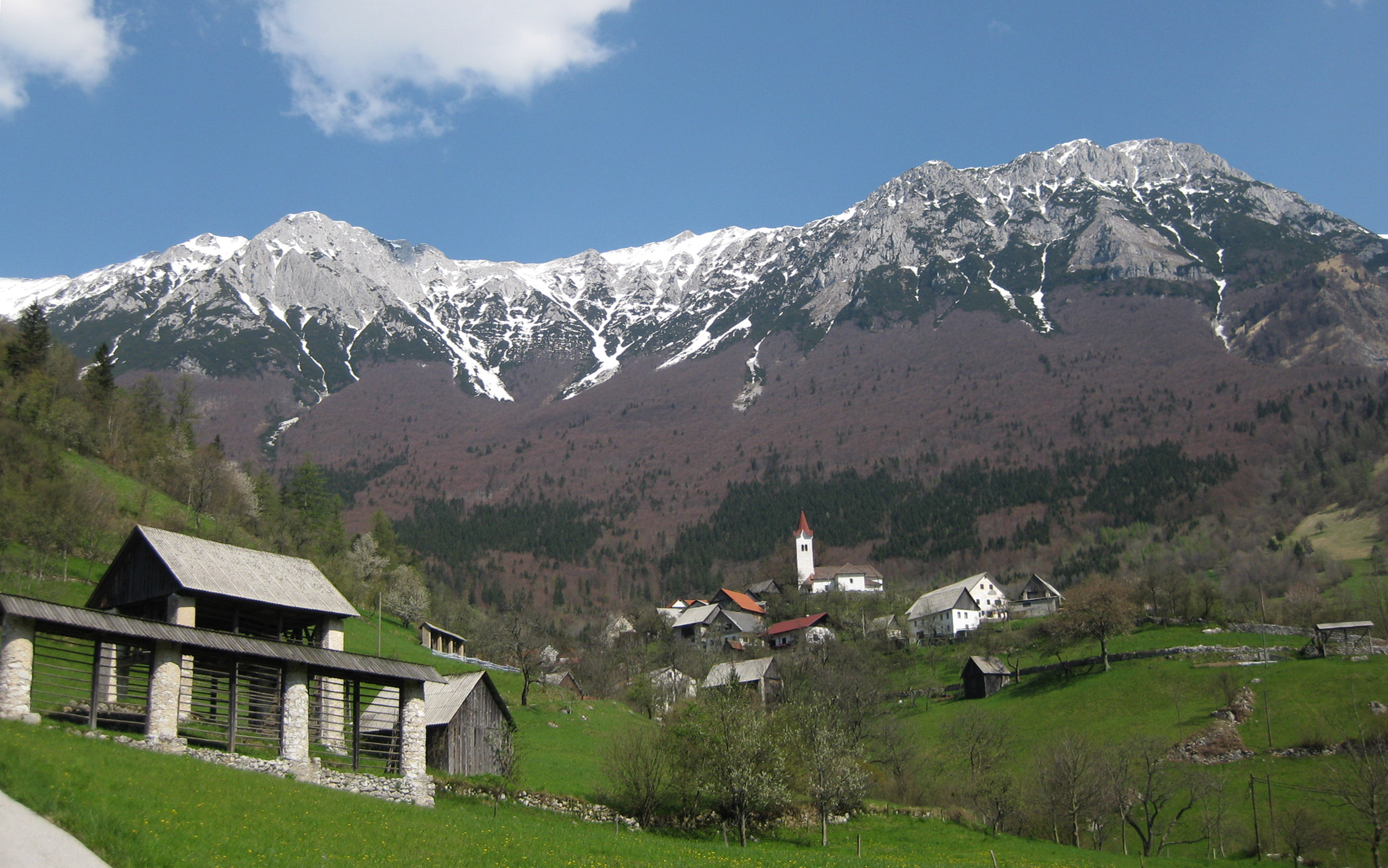

- Location in Slovenia
- Coordinates: 46°12′19.61″N 13°53′27.08″E
- Country: Slovenia
- Traditional region: Slovenian Littoral
- Statistical region: Gorizia
- Municipality: Tolmin

Area
  - Total: 10.17 km^{2} (3.93 sq mi)
- Elevation: 670.3 m (2,199 ft)

Population (2016)
  - Total: 43

Rut (pronounced [ˈɾuːt]; formerly Nemški Rut or Nemška Koritnica, German: Deutschruth; Italian: Rutte di Gracova) is a village north of Koritnica in the Municipality of Tolmin in the Littoral region of Slovenia.

== Name ==
Rut was attested in historical sources as Corithnich Reutharius in 1310, Cordnitze super Tulminum in 1480, Krytha bey der Pfarr in 1515, Coriniza di Baza in 1566, and Teutsch Coritniza in 1624, among many other names. It was labeled D. Ober Koritniza oder Deutsch Greuth in the late-18th-century Josephinian Land Survey. The Slovene name Rut is derived from the Slovene common noun rut, referring to a meadow on cleared land in a hilly environment. The Slovene noun is a borrowing from Middle High German rut 'clearing'. The older name of the village, Nemški Rut (literally, 'German Rut'), refers to the community of German speakers that formerly lived there. The Slovene name of the village was changed from Nemški Rut to Rut after the Second World War as part of efforts by Slovenia's postwar communist government to remove German elements from toponyms.

== Church ==
The parish church in the settlement is dedicated to Saint Lambert and belongs to the Koper Diocese.
