= Leše, Prevalje =

Leše
- Location in Slovenia
- Coordinates: 46°31′49.91″N 14°54′22.62″E
- Country: Slovenia
- Traditional region: Carinthia
- Statistical region: Carinthia
- Municipality: Prevalje

Area
  - Total: 6.05 km^{2} (2.34 sq mi)
- Elevation: 531.9 m (1,745 ft)

Population (2002)
  - Total: 531

Leše (pronounced [ˈleːʃɛ]) is a village in the hills southwest of Prevalje in the Carinthia region in northern Slovenia.

== Mass graves ==
Leše is the site of two known mass graves from the period immediately after the Second World War. They are located west of the settlement on the Prist farm, where the Leše coal mine ran under the property, causing many sinkholes in the area. They contain the remains of about 100 Austrian citizens (including ethnic Slovenes) as well as an unknown number of Slovene citizens from the Meža Valley that were murdered on 21 and 22 May 1945. The Leše 1 Mass Grave (Slovene: Grobišče Leše 1)—also known as the Veržun Woods Mass Grave (Grobišče Veržunov gozd), Janž Cave Mass Grave (Grobišče Janževa jama), and Gustav Mine Mass Grave (Grobišče rudnik Gustav)—is located 550 meters (1,800 ft) south of Saint Anne's Church. The Leše 2 Mass Grave (Grobišče Leše 2) is also known as the Veržun Woods Mass Grave (Grobišče Veržunov gozd). It is located 680 meters (2,230 ft) south of Saint Anne's Church.

== Churches ==
Above the settlement to the northwest are a pair of Gothic churches, built side by side in the mid-15th century. One is dedicated to Saint Anne and the other to Saint Wolfgang. Both belong to the Parish of Prevalje.
