= Ivo Vojnović =

Dramatist and playwright from Dubrovnik (1857–1929)

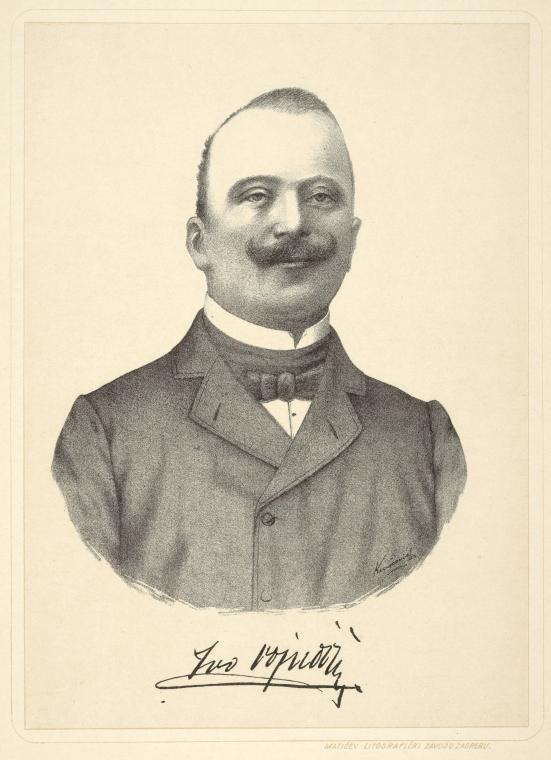
- Born: 9 October 1857; Dubrovnik, Kingdom of Dalmatia, Austrian Empire
- Died: 30 August 1929 (aged 71); Belgrade, Kingdom of Yugoslavia
- Citizenship: Austrian; Yugoslav
- Occupation: writer
- Parents: Konstantin Vojnović (father); Maria de Serragli (mother)
- Relatives: Vojnović noble family

Vojnović
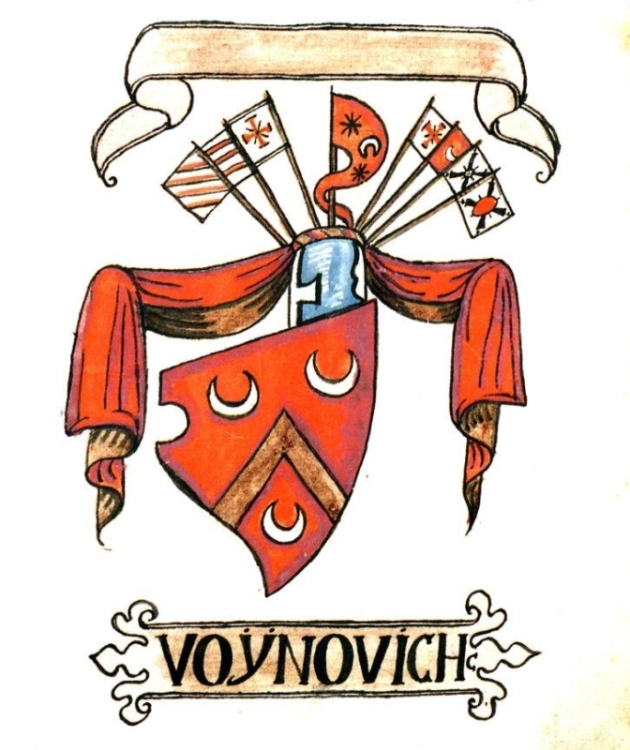
- Country: Republic of Venice; Republic of Ragusa
- Founded: 1771
- Dissolution: after 1838

Ivo Vojnović (9 October 1857 – 30 August 1929) was a writer from Dubrovnik.

== Biography ==
Vojnović was born in Dubrovnik as the first son of Count Konstantin Vojnović (1832–1903) and Maria de Serragli (1836–1922) on 9 October 1857 in Dubrovnik, the Habsburg monarchy. He was a member of the Serbian noble House of Vojnović through his father. His mother was of noble Florentine descent. The city of his birth and its history had an important influence on his later literary work. Most of his childhood however he spent in Split. He had a famous younger brother Lujo Vojnović, who would later play an important political and cultural role in the late 19th- and 20th-century Dalmatia and Montenegro.

As a young man he moved to Zagreb with his family, where he graduated from the University of Zagreb Faculty of Law in 1879. Until 1884 he served as a trainee of the Royal Court Table in Zagreb. After that he continued his judicial career in Križevci (1884–1889), Bjelovar (1889), Zadar (1889–1891).

In 1893, Vojnović wrote a short play Gundulićev san (lit. Gundulić's Dream) that was published in Dubrovnik at the time of the unveiling of the Gundulić monument, which explicitly advocated a unity of Croats and Serbs in Dubrovnik.

In 1899, he obtained employment at the court in Dubrovnik, then moved to Supetar on the island of Brač, then to Zadar, and again to Supetar. His career in the judiciary ended in 1907, when he was fired from the office in Supetar because of financial wrongdoing, and stripped of pension rights.

In 1907, he became the dramaturg at the Croatian National Theatre in Zagreb. At this time, Vojnović's pro-Serbian ideas were apparent from his work, in which he enthusiastically supported the unification of South Slavs under Serbia.

Prior to the Balkan Wars, Vojnović wrote plays that showed great pride in his origins, however, that would not augur well during World War I when war broke out between Austria-Hungary and Serbia.

In 1911, travelled to Italy, Prague, Budapest, Belgrade. In his 1912 visit to Belgrade he publicly claimed he had Serbian noble descent. In 1914, he went back to Dubrovnik where the Austrian-Hungarian government imprisoned him in a Šibenik jail under charges of being a Yugoslavian nationalist. After four months, on Christmas Eve 1914 he was relocated to a prison near Linz, Austria. He was detained without trial for three years by his Austrian captors. In 1917 he was finally transferred to the Sisters of Mercy Hospital in Zagreb. There, unsuccessful attempts were made to cure some severe eye ailments that he had contracted while being incarcerated.

After World War I ended, in 1919 he moved to France, where he mostly lived in Nice until 1922, when he moved back to Dubrovnik.

Because of his claims of being a nobleman, and because of his unrestrained Yugoslavism, by 1924 Miroslav Krleža had engaged in a public feud with him, calling him a fake count and a drama dilettante.

In 1928, Vojnović's eye problems became acute, threatened with blindness, and in ill health, he went to Serbia to be treated in a sanatorium in Krunska street, Vračar, Belgrade. He died there in 1929. He was buried in Dubrovnik.

== Works ==
Vojnović entered literature in 1880 when August Šenoa's Vienac published his short story "Geranijum" under the pseudonym Sergej P. Matica hrvatska under the leadership of Ivan Kukuljević Sakcinski published his novels Perom i olovkom in (1884) and Ksanta (1888) under the same pseudonym. Vojnović was the author of dramas of naturalistic cut, inspired by the literary and patriotic traditions of the Republic of Dubrovnik. He is known for his Dubrovačka trilogija (Zagreb, 1902), which was later translated into English and published in Graz in 1922 under the title of "Dubrovnik Trilogy". The book describes the fall of the Dubrovnik Republic. His other works include: Death of the Mother of the Jugović (1906) and Resurrection of Lazarus (1913). He is the author of psychological dramas such as: Lady of the Sunflower (1912; filmed in 1918 by Michael Curtiz), and of pieces such as: Dance of Masks in the Attic (1922), which reflect the influence of Luigi Pirandello on Vojnović. His play Equinox (Ekvinocij, 1898) was in 1942 put to opera with the same title by the Slovene composer Marjan Kozina.

== Legacy ==
The ethnicity and nationality of Ivo Vojnović is a disputed matter. His brother Lujo Vojnović had actively taken part in the Serb Catholic movement in 19th century Dubrovnik, unlike Ivo.

In 1921, Serbian literary critic Jovan Skerlić wrote: "Ivo Vojnović is one of those writers who are in the middle of two literatures and one language, between Serbian and Croatian. He started his work exclusively in Croatian literature, but in time proceeded towards Serbian motif and began writing for the Serbian literary public as well."

In 2005, Serbian literature professor Dušan Ivanić listed Ivo Vojnović in an anthology of Serb writers from Croatia, which prompted protests in Croatia.

In 2010, the National and University Library in Zagreb and the Dubrovnik branch of Matica hrvatska published the combined letters of Ivo Vojnović, in three volumes, collected by Tihomil Maštrović and edited by Luko Paljetak. His letters were interesting for their sheer volume—over 1,700 pages—the number of languages Vojnović had used, and some personal peculiarities that led to him being called a dandy.

== Sources ==
- Grijak, Zoran (February 2009). "Ivo Vojnović in Križevci". Cris: Journal of the Historical Society of Križevci. X (1). The Historical Society of Križevci. ISSN 1332-2567.
