= Vojinović (disambiguation) =

Vojinović is a Serbian surname.

Vojinović may also refer to:

- Vojinović Bridge, located in Vučitrn, Kosovo
- Vojinović Tower, city fortifications in Vučitrn, Kosovo,
