= Šentanel =

Šentanel Šent Danijel (until 1955), Spodnja Jamnica (1955–1970)
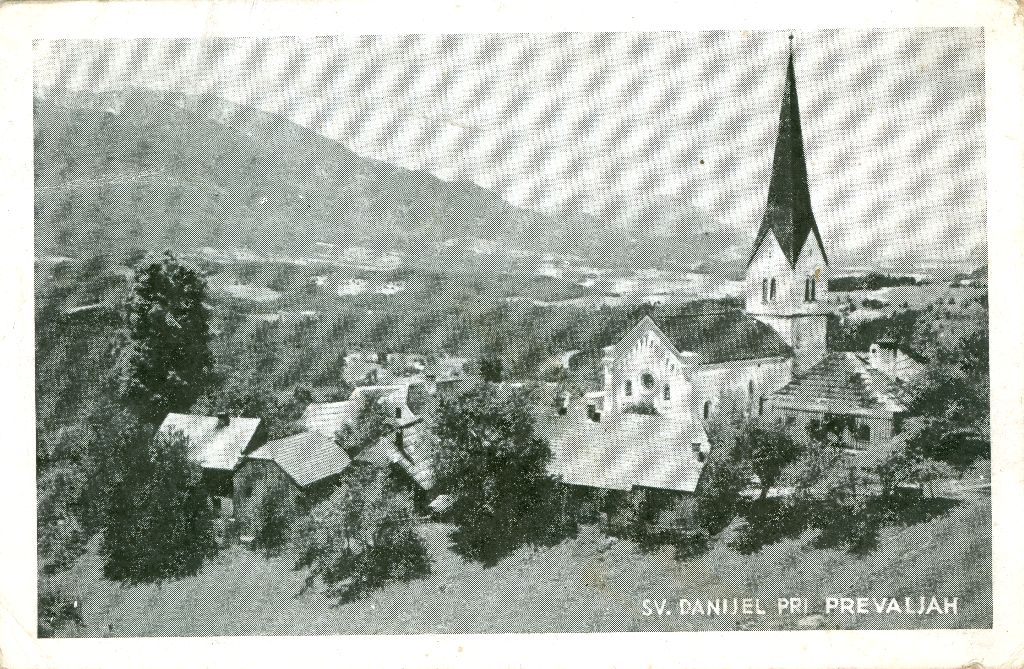
- 1918 postcard of Šentanel

- Location in Slovenia
- Coordinates: 46°34′21.71″N 14°52′32″E
- Country: Slovenia
- Traditional region: Carinthia
- Statistical region: Carinthia
- Municipality: Prevalje

Area
  - Total: 4.45 km^{2} (1.72 sq mi)
- Elevation: 681.4 m (2,236 ft)

Population (2002)
  - Total: 179

Šentanel (pronounced [ʃɛnˈtaːnɛu̯] or [ʃənˈtaːnɛu̯]) is a settlement in the hills northwest of Prevalje in the Carinthia region in northern Slovenia.

== Name ==
The name of the settlement was changed from Šent Danijel (literally, '"Saint" Daniel') to Spodnja Jamnica (literally, 'lower cave') in 1955. The name was changed on the basis of the 1948 Law on Names of Settlements and Designations of Squares, Streets, and Buildings as part of efforts by Slovenia's postwar communist government to remove religious elements from toponyms. The name Šent Danijel was restored in a contracted form in 1970 as Šentanel.

== Church ==
The parish church, from which the village gets its name, is dedicated to the Prophet Daniel. The current building was built in 1865, but remains of the original 12th-century building are visible in the belfry.
