= Belšak =

- Location in Slovenia
- Coordinates: 46°34′29.08″N 14°51′18.24″E
- Country: Slovenia
- Traditional region: Carinthia
- Statistical region: Carinthia
- Municipality: Prevalje

Area
  - Total: 2.29 km^{2} (0.88 sq mi)
- Elevation: 677.7 m (2,223 ft)

Population (2002)
  - Total: 42

Belšak (pronounced [ˈbeːlʃak] or [ˈbeːu̯ʃak]) is a small dispersed settlement in the Municipality of Prevalje in the Carinthia region in northern Slovenia, right on the border with Austria.
