= Ivanics =

Ivanics is a Hungarian surname, cognate to South Slavic Ivanić. Notable people with the surname include:

- Dóra Ivanics (born 1994), Hungarian handballer
- Ferenc Ivanics
- Gergely Ivanics (born 1978), Hungarian cyclist
