= On Our Own Land =

Na svoji zemlji
- Directed by: France Štiglic
- Written by: Ciril Kosmač
- Starring: Stane Sever; Lojze Potokar; Franc Presetnik; Mileva Zakrajšek; Štefka Drolc
- Cinematography: Ivan Marinček
- Edited by: Ivan Marinček
- Music by: Marjan Kozina
- Distributed by: Triglav Film
- Release date: November 21, 1948
- Running time: 110 min
- Country: Yugoslavia
- Language: Slovene

On Our Own Land (Slovene: Na svoji zemlji) is a 1948 film directed by France Štiglic. It was the first Slovene sound feature film. It was released on 21 November 1948 in Union Cinema (Kino Union) in Ljubljana, received great public acclaim, and was entered into the 1949 Cannes Film Festival.

== Plot ==
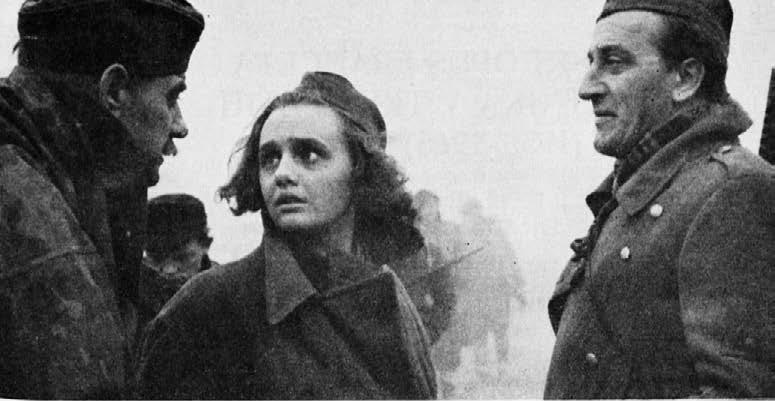
A scene from the film

The script was based (with significant changes) on the novella Grandpa Orel (Očka Orel) by Ciril Kosmač. It depicts the last two years of World War II in the Slovenian Littoral, annexed by the Italians. After their capitulation, the German army takes over a village. The movie tells about both the Partisan resistance forces and the villagers.

== Filming ==
The film was shot on location in the black-and-white technique in the villages of Grahovo ob Bači and Koritnica.

== Music ==
The music for the film was written by the composer Marjan Kozina.

== See also ==
- In the Kingdom of the Goldhorn, the first Slovene film
