= Equinox (opera) =

Equinox is a Slovene-language opera by the Slovenian composer Marjan Kozina (1907–1966). Based on a play by Ivo Vojnović, Kozina wrote the score and the libretto from 1940 until 1943, and then buried it in the garden of his parents to prevent its loss during the World War II. It was first performed in Ljubljana on May 2, 1946, conducted by Samo Hubad. In 1948, Kozina received the Prešeren Award for it.
