= Leopold Suhodolčan =

Slovene writer

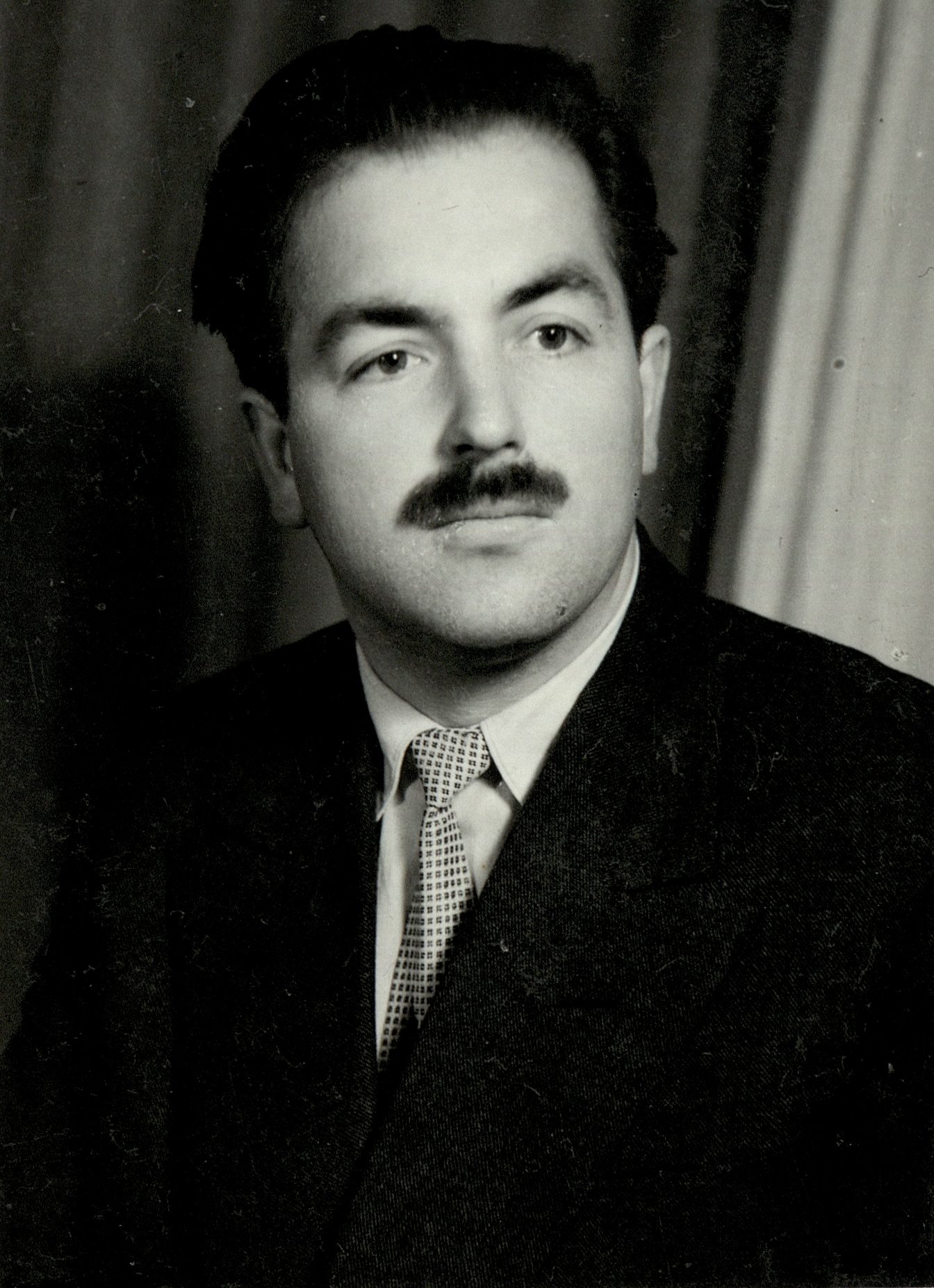
- Leopold Suhodolčan in 1958
- Born: 10 August 1928; Žiri, Kingdom of Yugoslavia (now in Slovenia)
- Died: 8 February 1980 (aged 51); Golnik, Socialist Federal Republic of Yugoslavia (now in Slovenia)
- Occupations: writer, fiction writer for youth
- Writing career
- Notable works: Velikan in Pajac, Krojaček Hlaček, Piko Dinozaver
- Notable awards: Levstik Award; 1965 for Velikan in Pajac; Levstik Award; 1979 for 'Piko Dinozaver' and other books

Leopold Suhodolčan (10 August 1928 – 8 February 1980) was a Slovene writer, best known for his juvenile fiction. Together with Stanko Kotnik he was one of the conceptors of the Reading Badge of Slovenia competition that still runs today as a motivation for primary school children in reading and literacy.

Suhodolčan was born in Žiri in 1928. He worked as a teacher and headmaster in Prevalje in Slovenian Carinthia. Though he wrote adult fiction, he is better known for his writing for young readers. His children's books have also been translated and published outside Slovenia. He died in Golnik in 1980. The Central Carinthian Library in Ravne na Koroškem has a memorial room dedicated to Suhodolčan.

Suhodolčan won the Levstik Award twice, in 1965 for his book Velikan in Pajac (The Giant and the Clown) and in 1979 for his book Piko Dinozaver (Piko the Dinosaur) and other books.

== Published works ==
=== Adult fiction ===
- Človek na zidu (Man on the Wall), short stories, 1960
- Svetlice (Lights), novel, 1965
- Dobrijska balada (The Balad of Dobrije), short stories, 1967
- Bog ljubezni (The God of Love), novel, 1968
- Sledovi molčečih (Traces of the Silent), novel, 1970
- Noro življenje (Mad Life), novel, 1972
- Najdaljša noč (The Longest Night), novel, 1975
- Med reko in zemljo (Between the River and Land), short stories, 1977
- Trenutki in leta (Moments and Years), novel, 1979
- Snežno znamenje (The Snow Sign), novel, 1981

=== Juvenile fiction ===
- Ognjeni možje (Men of Fire), 1955
- Sejem na zelenem oblaku (The Fair on the Green Cloud), 1958
- Deček na črnem konju (The Boy on the Black Horse), 1961
- Skriti dnevnik (The Hidden Diary), 1961
- Hi, konjiček (Go, Horsie), 1964
- Potovanje slona Jumba (Jumbo the Elephant's Journey), 1965
- Velikan in pajac (The Giant and the Clown), 1965
- Pikapolonček (The He-Ladybird), 1968
- Rdeči lev (The Red Lion), 1968
- Veliki in mali kapitan (Captain Big and Captain Little), 1968
- Rumena podmornica (The Yellow Submarine), 1969
- Krojaček Hlaček (Trooser the Tailor), 1970
- Punčka (The Little Girl), 1970
- Mornar na kolesu (The Sailor on the Bike), 1973
- Naočnik in očalnik, mojstra med detektivi (Specs and Goggles, Master Detectives), 1973
- Kam se je skril krojaček Hlaček? (Where Had Trooser the Tailor Hidden?), 1974
- Dvanajst slonov (twelve Elephants), 1976
- Na kmetiji (On the Farm), 1976
- Na večerji s krokodilom: nove detektivske mojstrovine Naočnika in Očalnika (Dinner With the Crocodile, the New Detective Adventures of Specs and Goggles), 1976
- Pipa, klobuk in dober nos (The Pipe, the Hat and a Good Nose), 1976
- 7 nagajivih (7 Naughty Ones), 1976
- Kurirčkov dnevnik: kurirček Andrej si je zapisal in narisal v dnevnik, kar je doživel Kurirčkov dnevnik (The Young Courier's Diary), 1977
- Stopinje po zraku in kako sta jih odkrila Naočnik in Očalnik, mojstra med detektivi (Footprints in the Air and How They Were Discovered by Specs and Goggles, Master Detectives), 1977
- Piko Dinozaver (Piko the Dinosaur), 1978
- Zgodilo se je 6. aprila (It Happened on 6 April), 1978
- Cepecepetavček (Stompaboutling), 1979
- Levi in desni klovn (The Left and Right Clown), 1979
- Markov maj (Mark's May), 1979
- O medvedku in dečku (About A Bear and A Boy), 1979
- Peter Nos je vsemu kos (Peter Nose Can Do It All), 1979
- PraMatija ali Bučman (Ol'Matija or Thickhead), 1980
- Pri nas in okoli nas (At Our Place and Hereabouts), 1981
- Pisatelj, povej mi (Tell Me, Mr Writer), 1982
- Kuža Luža (Puddles the Dog), 1984
- O dedku in medvedku (About A Grandad and A Bear), 1987
- Koroške pripovedke (Carinthian Tales), 1998
