= Grahovo ob Bači =

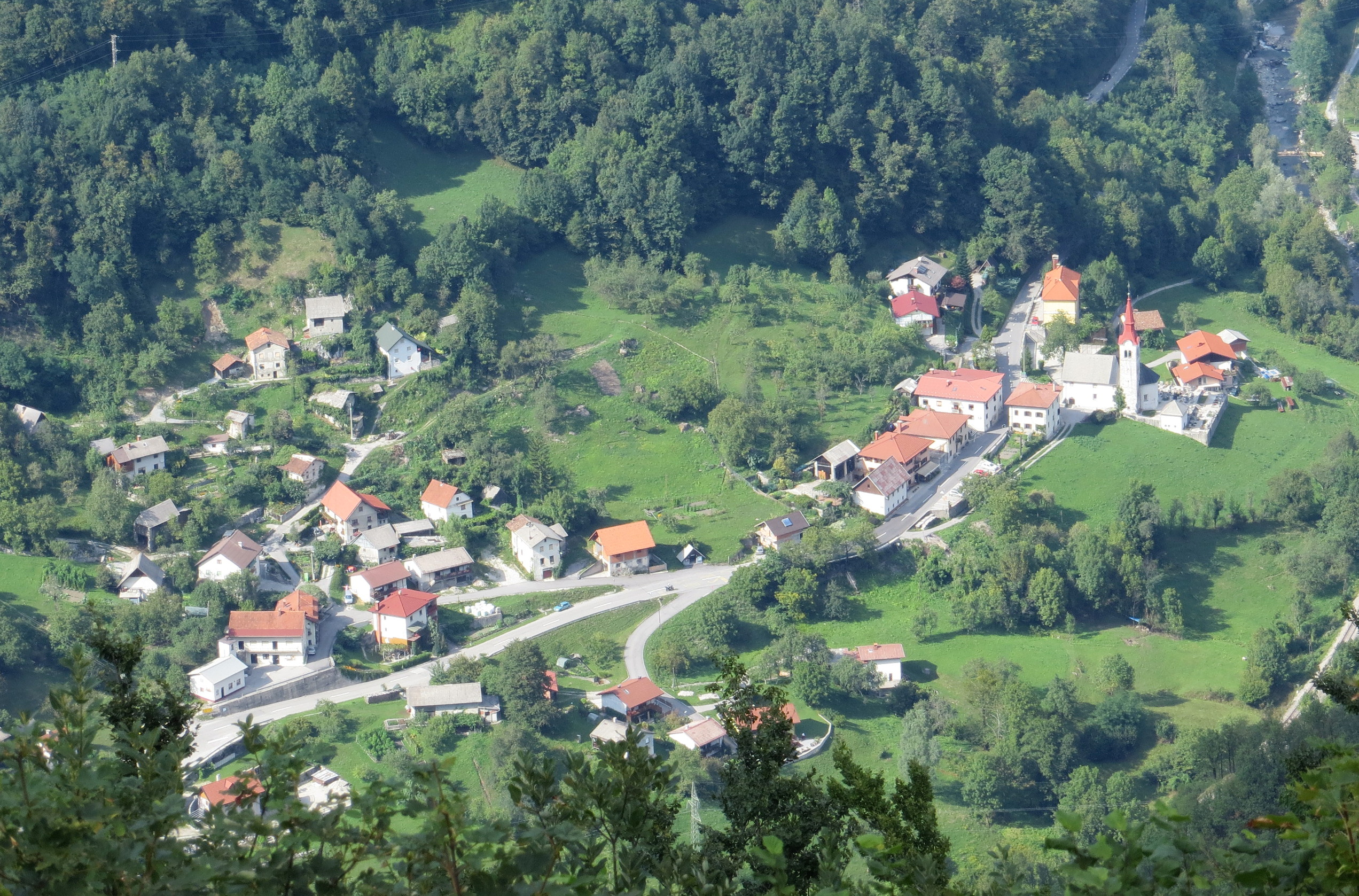

- Location in Slovenia
- Coordinates: 46°9′23.12″N 13°51′52.27″E
- Country: Slovenia
- Traditional region: Slovenian Littoral
- Statistical region: Gorizia
- Municipality: Tolmin

Area
  - Total: 7.47 km^{2} (2.88 sq mi)
- Elevation: 313.1 m (1,027 ft)

Population (2025)
  - Total: 122

Grahovo ob Bači (pronounced [ˈɡɾaːxɔʋɔ ɔb ˈbaːtʃi]; Italian: Gracova Serravalle) is a village on the Bača River in the Municipality of Tolmin in the Littoral region of Slovenia.

== Name ==
The name of the settlement was changed from Grahovo to Grahovo ob Bači (literally, 'Grahovo on the Bača River') in 1955. The name is believed to have the same origin as Grahovo in the Municipality of Cerknica. If so, it is probably derived from the personal name Grah, which is still preserved as a surname in Slovenia and is probably borrowed from the Old High German name Gracco. The place name would thus mean 'Grah's (village)'. Another possible derivation is from the common noun *grahovišče 'pea field' via the contracted form *grahovše. Direct derivation from the Slovene common noun grah 'pea' is unlikely because of the rarity of such names and the suffixation pattern.

== Church ==
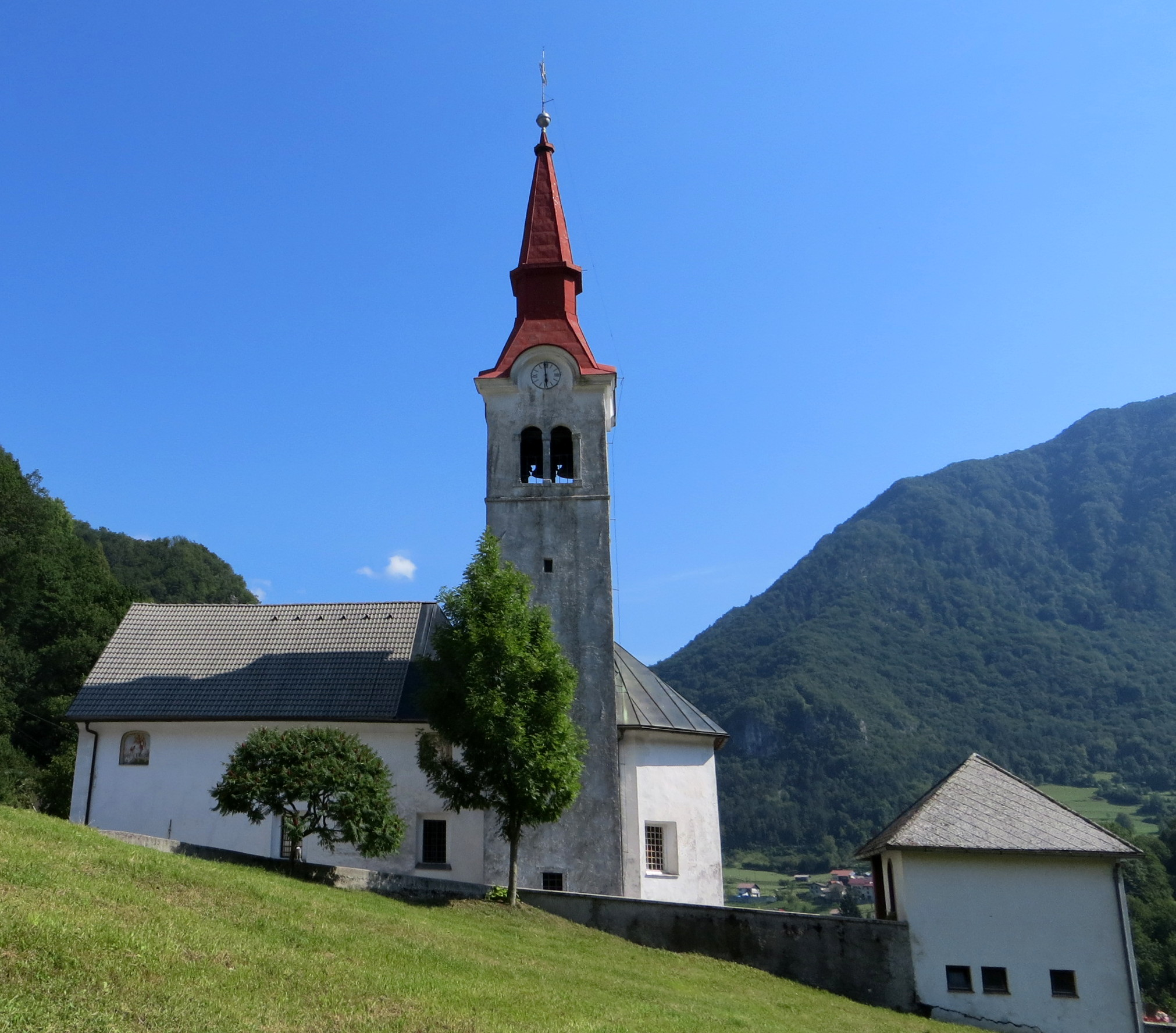
Saint Anne's Church

The parish church in the settlement is dedicated to Saint Anne and belongs to the Koper Diocese.

== Other cultural heritage ==
The village was one of the main filming locations for the 1948 film On Our Own Land. The east end of the Bukovo Tunnel (937 meters or 3,074 feet) on the Bohinj Railway stands in the easternmost part of the settlement's territory.

== Gallery ==
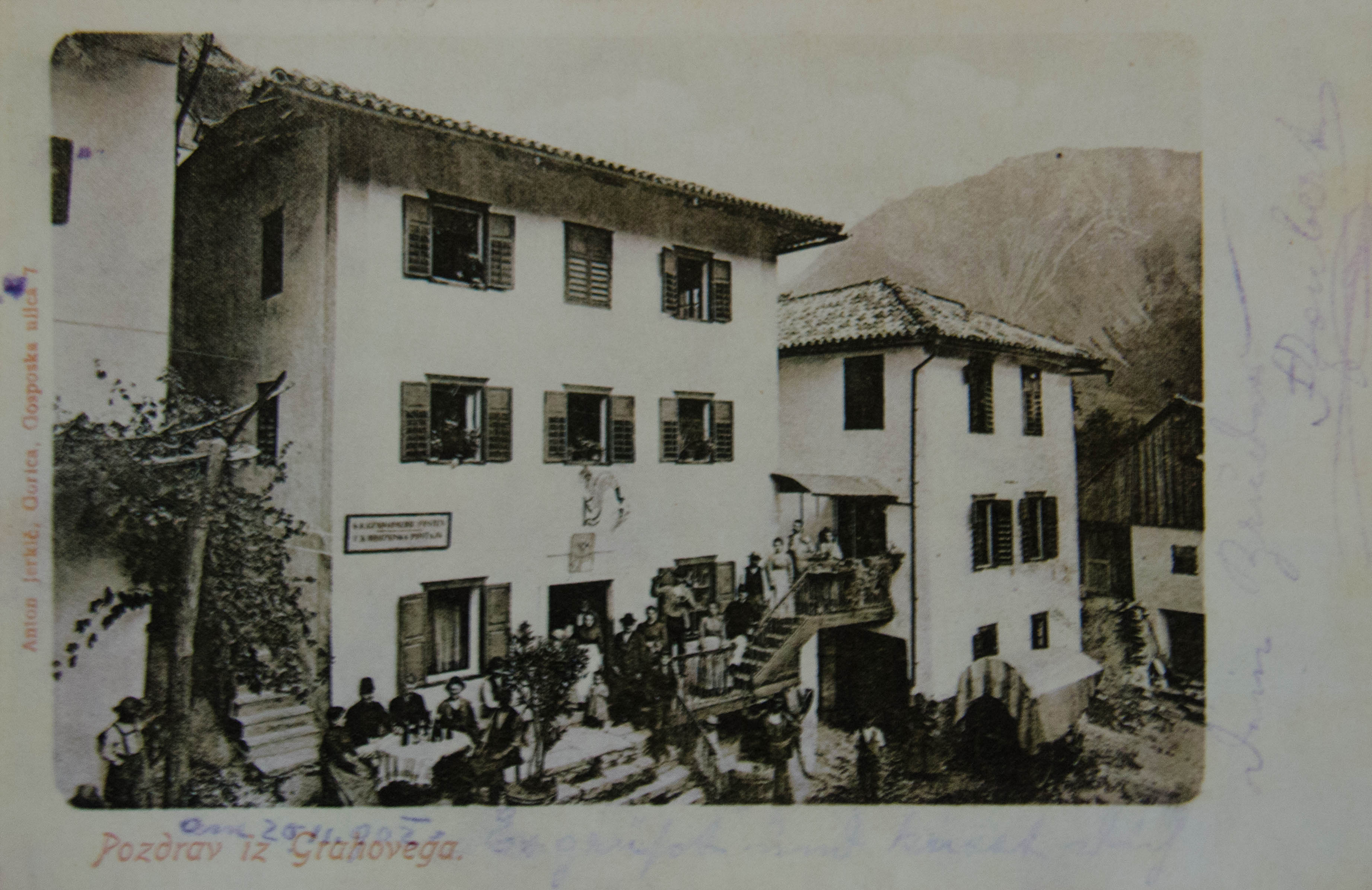
Old postcard of Grahovo ob Bači

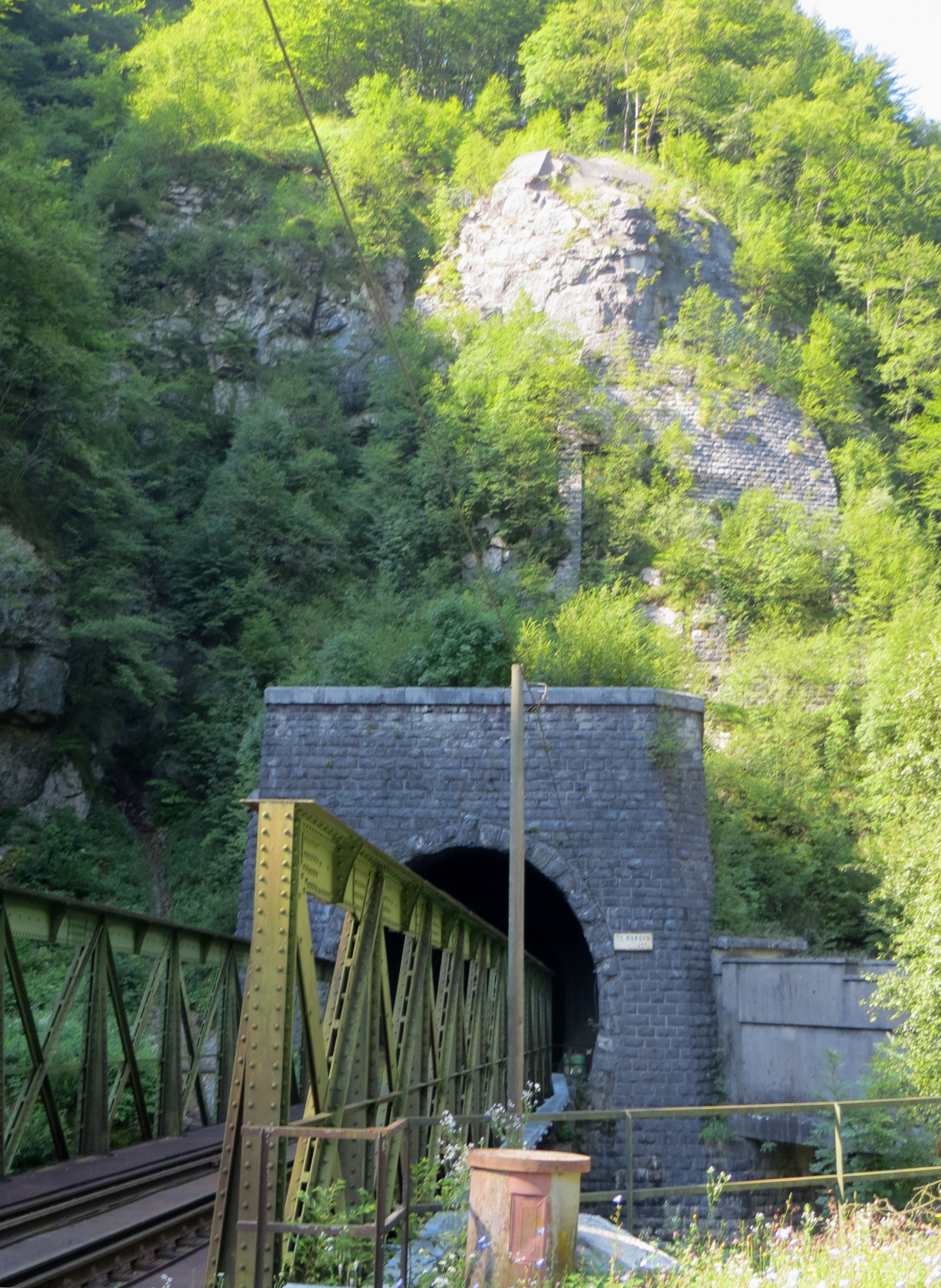
The Bukovo Tunnel east of Grahovo ob Bači
