= Lokovica, Prevalje =

Lokovica
- Location in Slovenia
- Coordinates: 46°33′10.34″N 14°50′50.75″E
- Country: Slovenia
- Traditional region: Carinthia
- Statistical region: Carinthia
- Municipality: Prevalje

Area
  - Total: 3.31 km^{2} (1.28 sq mi)
- Elevation: 494.6 m (1,623 ft)

Population (2002)
  - Total: 146

Lokovica (pronounced [ˈloːkɔʋitsa]) is a settlement in the Municipality of Prevalje in the Carinthia region in northern Slovenia, close to the border with Austria.
