= Municipality of Prevalje =

Municipality of Slovenia

Municipality of Prevalje Občina Prevalje
- Municipality
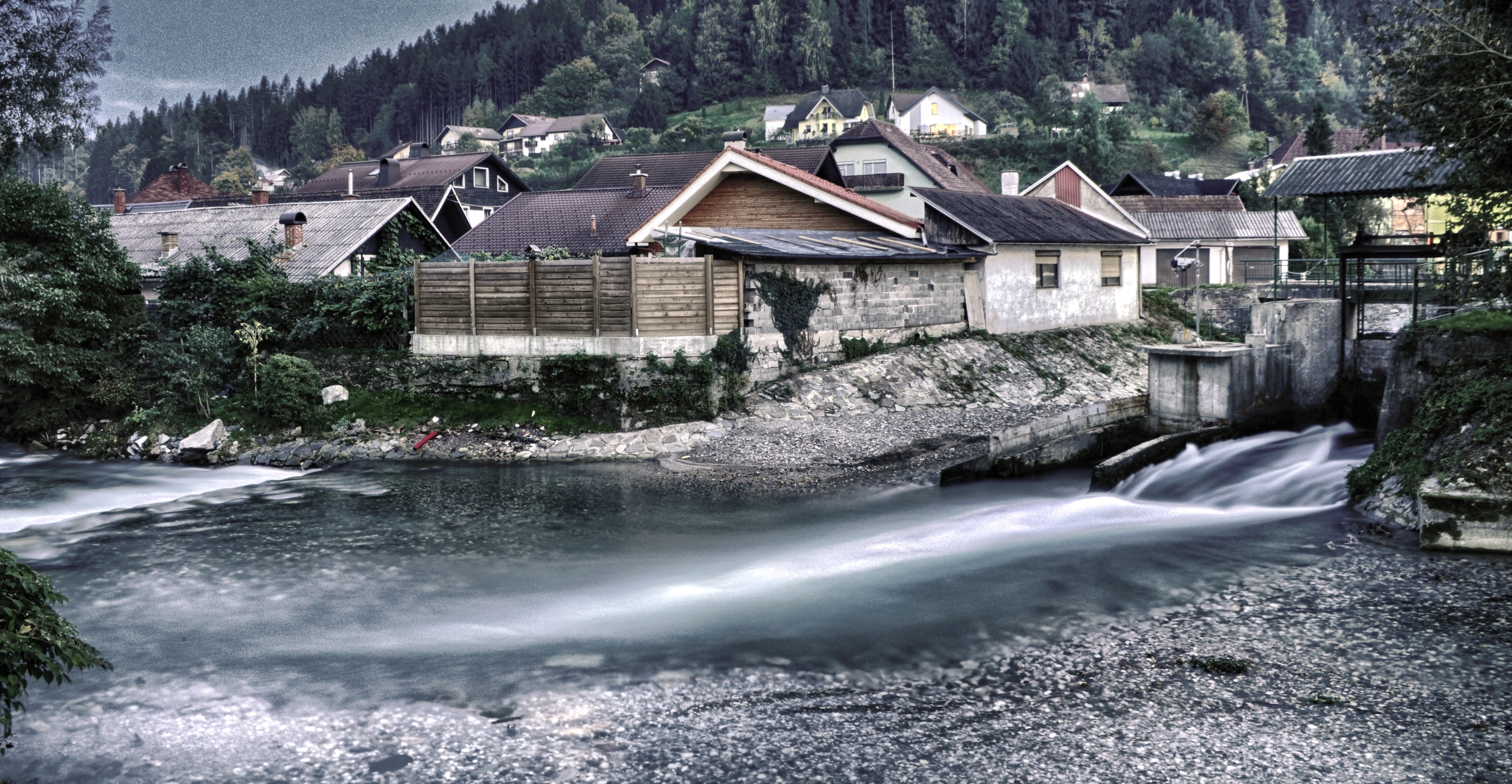

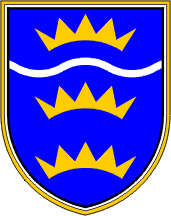
- Coat of arms

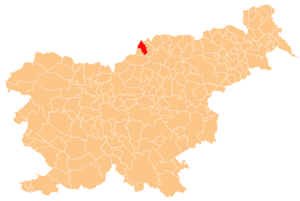
- Location of the Municipality of Prevalje in Slovenia
- Coordinates: 46°33′N 14°59′E
- Country: Slovenia

Government
  - Mayor: Matija Tasič (Independent)

Area
  - Total: 58.1 km^{2} (22.4 sq mi)

Population (July 1, 2018)
  - Total: 6,827
  - Density: 118/km^{2} (304/sq mi)
- Time zone: UTC+01 (CET)
  - Summer (DST): UTC+02 (CEST)
- Website: www.prevalje.si

The Municipality of Prevalje (pronounced [ˈpɾeːʋaljɛ]; Slovene: Občina Prevalje) is a municipality in the traditional region of Carinthia in northern Slovenia. The seat of the municipality is the town of Prevalje. Prevalje became a municipality in 1999. It borders Austria.

== Settlements ==
In addition to the municipal seat of Prevalje, the municipality also includes the following settlements:

- Belšak
- Breznica
- Dolga Brda
- Jamnica
- Kot pri Prevaljah
- Leše
- Lokovica
- Poljana
- Šentanel
- Stražišče
- Suhi Vrh
- Zagrad
