= Lujo Vojnović =

Serbian writer

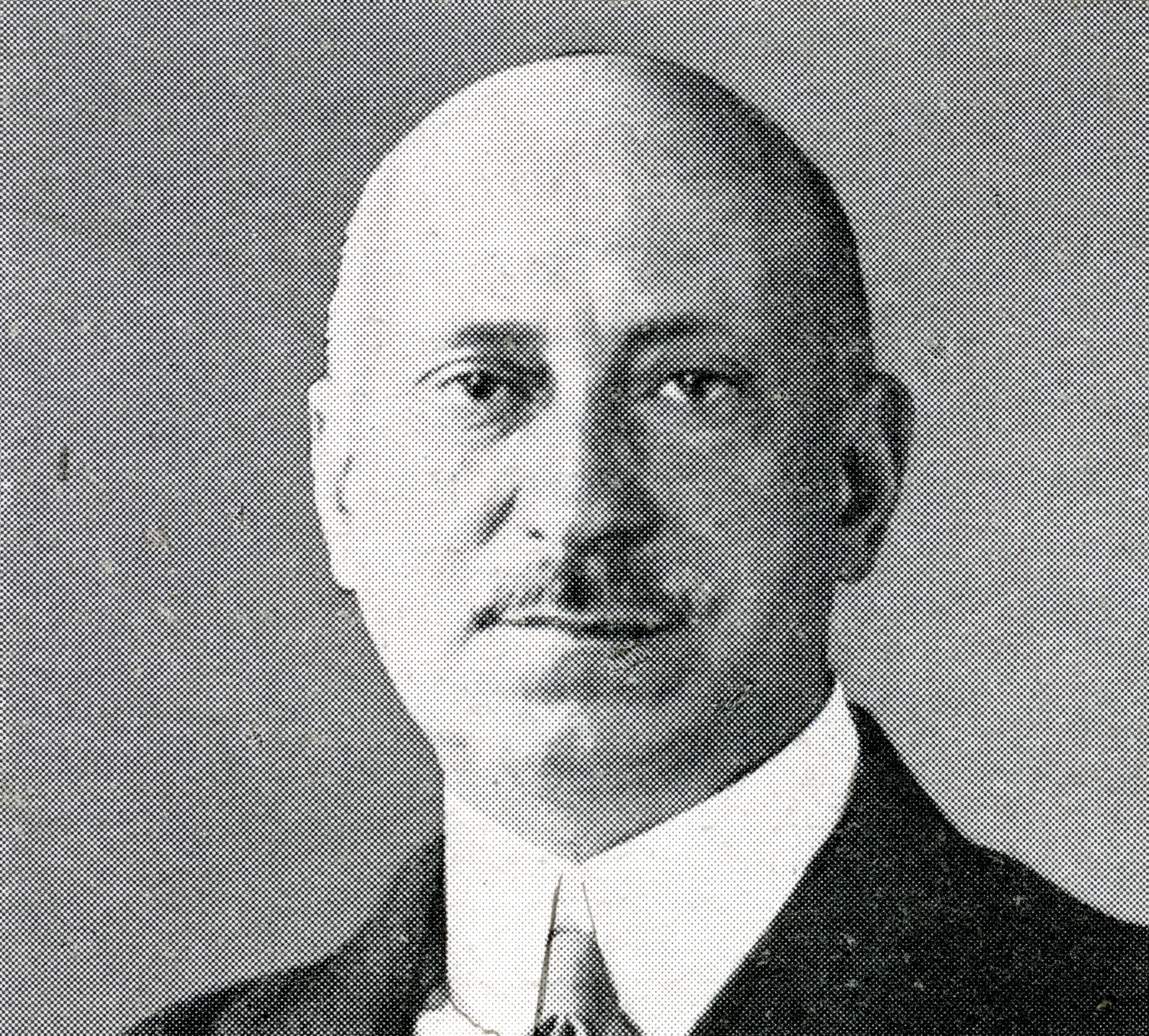
- Born: 15 April 1864; Split, Austrian Empire
- Died: 18 April 1951 (aged 87); Zagreb, FPR Yugoslavia
- Occupations: Writer, politician and diplomat
- Writing career
- Notable work: Istorija Dubrovačke republike

3rd Minister of Justice of Principality of Montenegro
- In office 25 November 1899 – 3 June 1903
- Monarch: Nicholas I
- President of the State Council: Božo Petrović-Njegoš
- Preceded by: Valtazar Bogišić
- Succeeded by: Miloš Đ. Shaulić

Lujo Vojnović (Serbian Cyrillic: Лујо Војновић, 15 April 1864 – 18 April 1951) was a Serbian writer, politician, and diplomat from Dubrovnik. His older brother was Ivo Vojnović, the dramatist and poet.

== Biography ==
Vojnović was born in Split into the Serbian noble House of Vojnović from Herceg Novi, the second son of Konstantin Vojnović and Maria Serragli. Vojnović studied law at the University of Zagreb. However, he graduated and earned a doctorate at the University of Graz in 1892. This choice of university is indicative of Vojnović's political loyalties for during this period Serbs who were ardently anti-Austrian usually took their degrees at Graz or later Prague instead of at Vienna as had been customary earlier.

After graduating, he served as a judicial clerk in Zagreb, and later became a law clerk in Sarajevo and Trieste. He eventually settled in Dubrovnik, beginning in 1894 (until 1896), and spent less time in his law office and more time scouring through myriad manuscripts that he found in the municipal and private collections of Dubrovnik's ancient archives. He spent two years as tutor to Prince Alexander II Karađorđević, accompanying him to St. Petersburg in 1896. Back from Russia in late 1896, Lujo Vojnović became a secretary to Prince Nicholas I of Montenegro. Vojnović was promoted to Minister, serving as Montenegro's Minister of Justice. Following his appointment, he reformed the Montenegrin judicial system.

Between 1901 and 1903, Vojnović served as Montenegro's plenipotentiary ambassador in the Vatican. Between 1904 and 1906, he served under King Peter I of Serbia. Between 1907 and 1911, while in Bulgaria, Vojnović prepared the grounds for the Serbo-Bulgarian Agreement in 1911. Lujo Vojnović returned to Montenegro in 1912, serving in government once more.

When the Turks sued for peace with the Serbs and Bulgarians, and concluded an armistice on 3 December 1912, the Powers decided to arrange a peace conference in London on 12 December, known as the St. James Conference, and invited the belligerents to participate. Although Nicholas of Montenegro doggedly continued prosecuting his campaign against Turkish-occupied Scutari, he agreed to send abroad three of his most loyal representatives, Lazar Mijušković, Jovo Popović and Vojnović. Between 1913 and 1914, Vojnović served as the Montenegrin delegate at the London Peace Conference, signing the Treaty of London on 28 May 1913. Then again in 1918, Vojnović was one of the Yugoslav delegates to the Paris Peace Conference, 1919 where he and his knowledge of history and ethnic distribution in the Balkan peninsula served him in good stead.

Vojnović married Tinka Kopač and had two daughters: Marija and Ksenija.

He died in Zagreb in 1951. He was 87.

== Works ==
- Dubrovnik i Osmansko carstvo (Dubrovnik and the Ottoman Empire), Belgrade: Srpska Kraljevska Akademija, 1898
- Dalmatia and the Jugoslav Movement, London: George Allen & Unwin Ltd.; New York: Charles Scribner's Sons, 1920
- The Question of the Adriatic: Fiume (Rieka), Publisher: Graphique, 1919
- A Saunder Through the History of Dubrovnik, "Jadran" Booksellers and Printers, 1927
- Književni ćasovi, Knižara Mirka Breyera, 1912
