= Marjan Kozina =

Slovene composer

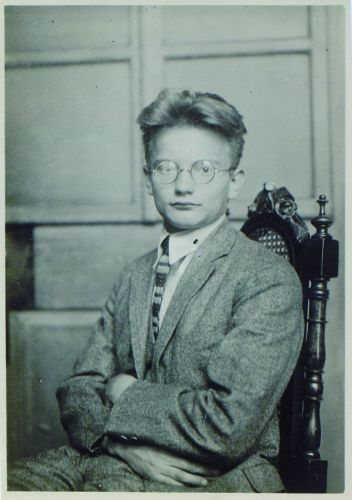
Marjan Kozina in 1923

Marjan Kozina (4 June 1907 – 19 June 1966) was a Slovene composer. He is considered one of the most important Slovene composers of the 20th century. His best known works include a symphony, composed in stages through the late 1940s; the opera Equinox, completed in 1943; two ballets from the early 1950s, and the music for the film On Our Own Land (Na svoji zemlji), which he later arranged into a suite for orchestra.

== Life ==
Kozina was born to a musical family in Novo Mesto, then part of Austria-Hungary. In Ljubljana, Kozina began studying philosophy and mathematics and in the same time also piano and violin, but later completely turned to the study of music. He graduated from composition in Vienna in 1930, and completed the studies of conducting and composition also in Prague. After his return from Prague he worked for a short time (1932–34) at Ljubljana and Maribor Opera, and then worked at Maribor Music Society (Slovene: Glasbena matica Maribor). From 1940 until 1943 and from 1945 until 1947, he worked as a music teacher at the Academy of Music in Belgrade. In World War II, his house was bombed in an air raid and his wife imprisoned by the Gestapo. In September 1943, after the capitulation of Italy, he joined the Slovene Partisans. After the liberation, in 1948, he became the first manager of the Slovene Philharmonic Orchestra, and held the post until 1951, when he became a professor at the Academy of Music in Ljubljana. In 1953, he was elected a regular member of the Slovene Academy of Sciences and Arts. He lived and created in Novo Mesto and Trška Gora. He died in Novo Mesto after a heavy illness.

== Work ==
From 1940 until 1943, Kozina completed the score and the libretto of his only opera Equinox (Ekvinokcij), based on the eponymous play by the Croatian–Serbian playwright Ivo Vojnović. Before his leaving to the Partisans, he buried it in the garden of his parents in order to prevent its loss during the war. It was first performed in May 1946 at the Ljubljana Opera House, and in 1948 he was bestowed the Prešeren Award for it.

The major Kozina's contribution to the Slovene symphonic music was a symphony comprising four movements, which are actually individual symphonic poems and were composed separately. They are titled White Carniola (Bela krajina; 1946), Mount Ilova (Ilova gora, 1947), To the Fallen (Padlim, 1948), and Towards the Sea (Proti morju, 1949). Although the symphony was rarely performed in entirety, the first movement was one of the most often conducted Slovene symphonic composition of the post-war times. Musicians performed it in all sorts of musical ensembles including accordion and brass ensembles. Its optimism represented the will to live of the entire nation.

Besides it, Kozina composed the ballets The Tales About Gorjanci (Gorjanske bajke; 1952–1961) and Diptihon (1952), and the music for the films On Our Own Land (1948), Kekec (1951), Valley of Peace (1956), and others. Kozina also devoted himself to writing and translating. He wrote about music, aesthetics, the role of art and the artist in contemporary society, he translated a series of novels, wrote itineraries, reviews, polemics, and popular expert essays.

== Recognition ==
In 1948, Kozina was bestowed the Prešeren Award for his opera Equinox, and in 1956, Trdina Award (the municipal award by Novo Mesto) as well as the Golden Arena for Best Film Music for the music of the Valley of Peace film. The highest Slovene prize awarded to composers has been named Kozina Award. Since 1970, a street in Novo Mesto has been named Marjan Kozina Street (Ulica Marjana Kozine). In 2007, a production studio from Novo Mesto shot a documentary about Kozina, and a symposium on the composer was held in Novo Mesto. The musical school in Novo Mesto is named after Kozina. In 1971, a bronze bust of the composer, created by Zdenko Kalin, was unveiled in Novo Mesto. On 13 January 2008, the centenary of the Slovene Philharmonics, the great hall of the Philharmonics building in Ljubljana was named after Kozina.
