= Stražišče, Ravne na Koroškem =

Stražišče
- Location in Slovenia
- Coordinates: 46°33′1.26″N 14°56′43.81″E
- Country: Slovenia
- Traditional region: Carinthia
- Statistical region: Carinthia
- Municipality: Ravne na Koroškem

Area
  - Total: 2.75 km^{2} (1.06 sq mi)
- Elevation: 419.7 m (1,377 ft)

Population (2002)
  - Total: 214
- The data in this infobox refer only to the part of the settlement in the Municipality of Ravne na Koroškem

Stražišče (pronounced [stɾaˈʒiːʃtʃɛ]) is a dispersed settlement in the hills north of Ravne na Koroškem in the Carinthia region in northern Slovenia. Part of the settlement lies in the neighbouring Municipality of Prevalje.
