= Ivanić =

Ivanić (Serbian Cyrillic: Иванић, pronounced [ǐʋanitɕ]) is a Croatian and Serbian surname. Notable people with the surname include:

- Delfa Ivanić (1881–1972), Serbian painter, humanitarian and writer
- Dušan Ivanić (born 1946), Croatian-born Serbian literary historian
- Mirko Ivanić (born 1993), Serbian-born Montenegrin footballer
- Mladen Ivanić (born 1958), Bosnian Serb politician
- Ivan Ivanić (1867–1935), a Yugoslav diplomat
- Matija Ivanić (c. 1445–1523), citizen of Hvar who led a rebellion against the Venetian Republic
- Rosalind Ivanić (born 1949), Yugoslav-born British linguist
