= Koritnica, Tolmin =

Koritnica
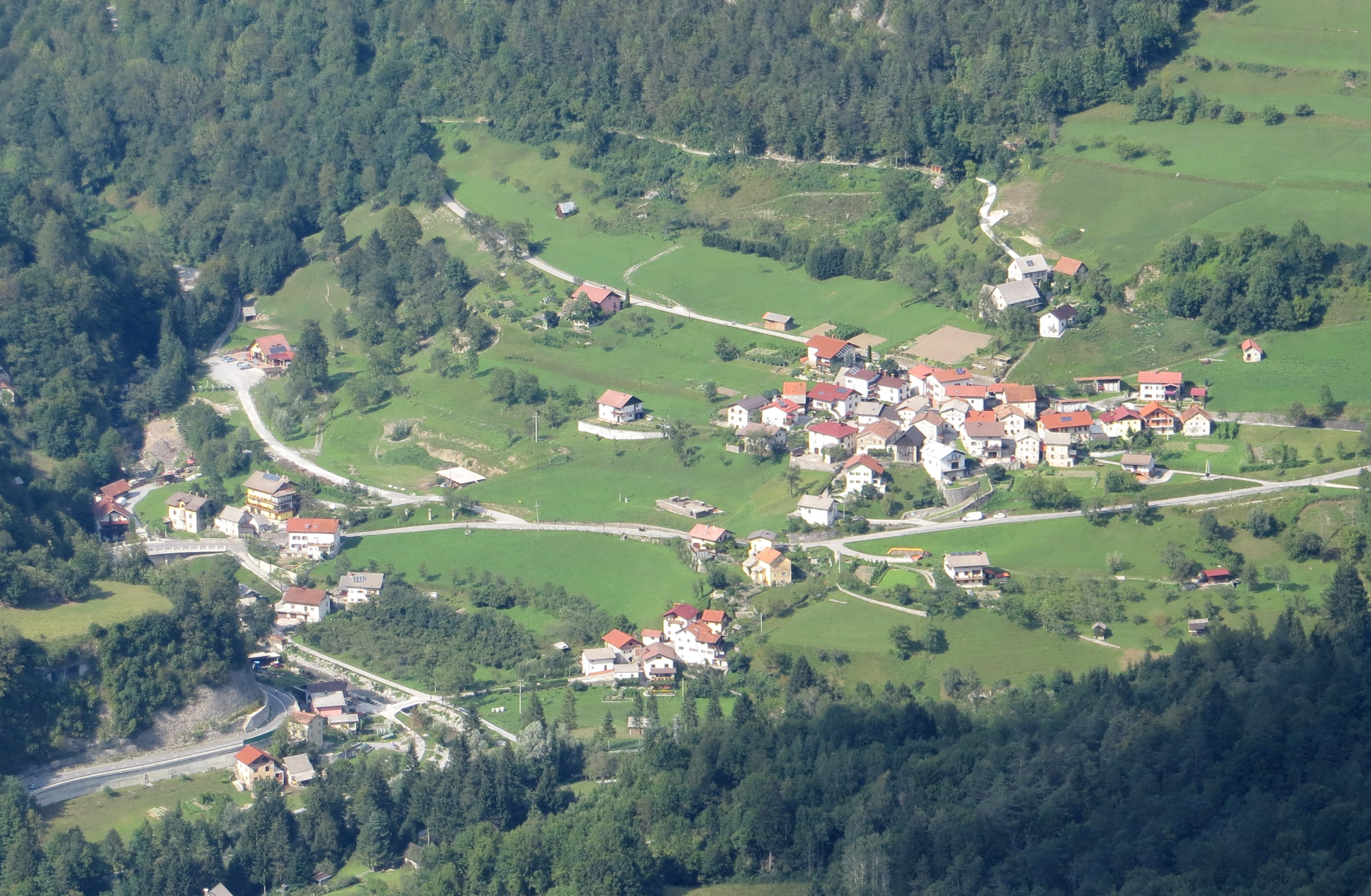

- Location in Slovenia
- Coordinates: 46°9′51.03″N 13°52′30.39″E
- Country: Slovenia
- Traditional region: Slovenian Littoral
- Statistical region: Gorizia
- Municipality: Tolmin

Area
  - Total: 6.76 km^{2} (2.61 sq mi)
- Elevation: 316.1 m (1,037 ft)

Population (2002)
  - Total: 179

Koritnica (pronounced [kɔˈɾiːtnitsa]) is a village on the right bank of the Bača River in the Municipality of Tolmin in the Littoral region of Slovenia.

== Name ==
Koritnica was attested in written sources in 1377 as Coritinicha. Like related names (e.g., Koritnice, Koritno, and Korita), the name is derived from the common noun korito 'trough; river bed', referring to the configuration of a local river or stream.

== Trivia ==
The village was one of the filming locations for the 1948 film On Our Own Land.
