= Vojnović noble family =

Serbian noble family

Vojnović Војновић Vojinović Војиновић
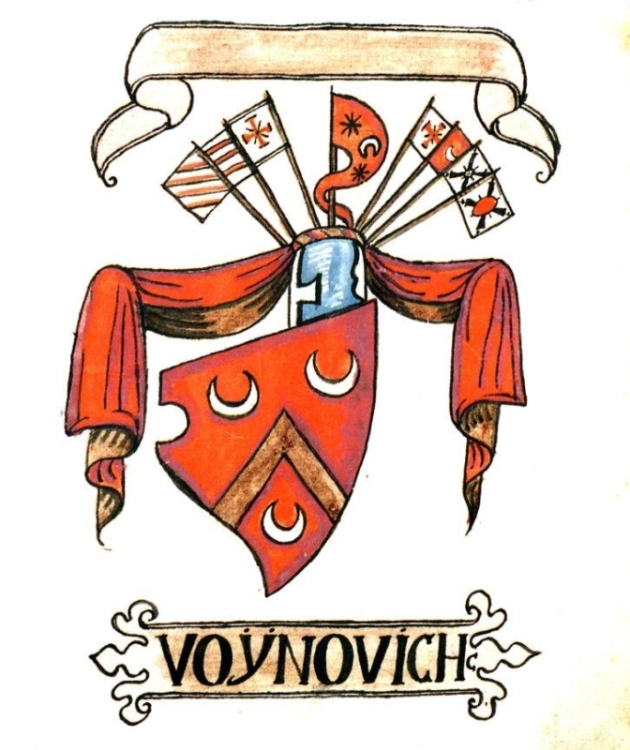
- Country: Republic of Venice; Republic of Ragusa
- Founded: 1771
- Dissolution: after 1838

The Vojnović family (Serbian Cyrillic: Војновић, pl. Vojnovići / Војновићи) or Vojinović (Serbian Cyrillic: Војиновић, pl. Vojinovići / Војиновићи), was a Serbian noble family in the Bay of Kotor and Dalmatia active in the 18th and early 19th century, serving the Republic of Venice and Republic of Ragusa. They were very prominent politicians, intellectuals, soldiers, maritime captains and merchants in history of Dalmatia.

The family tree can be reached back to 1536. According to tradition, the family descended from Vojin, the grandson of Serbian king Stefan Dečanski (r. 1321–32). The family moved to the Bay of Kotor from Herzegovina in 1692, fleeing Ottoman terror, settling in Herceg Novi, which was taken over by the Republic of Venice after the 1689–92 battles of the Morean War. The Republic of Venice recognized their nobility status and coat of arms after 1771, Austria in 1815 (along with other para-nobility of Dalmatia and the Bay of Kotor). Upon receiving noble status, the family adopted the coat of arms of Serbian magnate Nikola Altomanović (fl. 1359–76) as displayed in the Il regno di Slavi of Mavro Orbini (1563–1614).

From the end of the 17th- to the 19th-century members of the family emigrated to Austria, Italy, Hungary and Russia. Marko Vojnović (1732–1807) founded the Black Sea Fleet of the Imperial Russian Navy. Jovan V. Vojnović (fl. 1772–82) was a Russian admiral and general consul in the Greek archipelago. Aleksandar V. Vojnović was a Russian cavalry general.

== Family tree ==
- Vujo Vojinović
  - Miloš Vujov Serdarević
  - Jovan Vujov Vojnović, progenitor of the Herceg Novi Vojnović
    - Pavle Jovanov Vojnović
    - brothers Jovan Vojnović, Vojin Vojnović, Dimitrije Vojnović of Trieste
      - Marko Jovanov Vojnović of Imperial Russia
    - Vasilije (Vasilj) Jovanov Vojnović (married Ana Magazinović)
      - Jovan (Ivan) Vasiljević Vojnović
      - Đorđe Vasiljević Vojnović (married Cassandra Angeli Radovani)
        - Jovan Đorđev Vojnović (married Katarina Gojković)
          - Đorđe Jovanov Vojnović (married an unknown member of the Martinelli clan)
            - Dušan Đorđev Vojnović
            - Ljubica Vojnović (married an unknown member of the Mirković clan)
            - Darinka Vojnović (married an unknown member of the Gojković clan)
          - Konstantin (Kosta) Jovanov Vojnović (married Maria Serragli)
            - Ivo Konstantinov Vojnović
            - Lujo Konstantinov Vojnović (married Tinka Kopač)
              - Marija (Marica) Lujov Vojnović (married an unknown member of the Schidlof clan)
                - Ivan Schidlof
              - Xenia Vojnović (not married)
            - Eugenija Vojnović (married Charles Loiseau)
              - Frédéric-Jean Loiseau
                - Geneviève Loiseau (married René Carlier)
                - Christiane Loiseau (married André Bommeler)
              - Ivan Loiseau (married Jeanne-Marie Pavie)
              - Kostia Loiseau
              - Marie-Hélène Loiseau (married François Jager)
                - François Jager (married Bernadette Lefebure)
                - Henriette Jager (married Emmanuel Lescure)
                - Kostia Jager (married Marie Seichepine)
                - Hélène Jager (married Mériadec Lescure)
                  - Jérôme Lescure - 1960
                  - Patricia Lescure - 1962 (married Xavier d'Esquerre)
                    - Séverine d'Esquerre -1988 (married Jean-Baptiste du Tremolet de Lacheisserie)
                      - Constantin du Tremolet de Lacheisserie- 2014
                      - Paul du Tremolet de Lacheisserie - 2016
                    - Anne-France d'Esquerre-1991
                    - Matthieu d'Esquerre-1991
                    - Arnaud d'Esquerre - 1996
                    - Louis d'Esquerre -2001
                    - Alexandre d'Esquerre - 2003
                  - Benoit Lescure
                  - François Lescure
                  - Nicolas Lescure - 1970
                  - Catherine Lescure
            - Kristina Vojnović
            - Katica Vojnović
      - Aleksandar Vasiljević Vojnović
      - Dmitar Vasiljević Vojnović
        - Nikola Vojnović

== Sources ==
- Martinović, Dušan J. (2003). "Admirali i generali Vojnovići u ruskoj vojsci" (in Serbian). Project Rastko Boka.
