= Vojin Menkovič =

Serbian handball player (born 1982)

Vojin Menković (born 20 October 1982) is a Serbian handball player, currently playing for HT Tatran Prešov in the Slovak Extraliga. He also played in RK Crvena zvezda, Xant Thessalonike, HC Odorheiu Secuiesc and Al Rayyan Sports Club
