= Dušan Ivanić =

Serbian literary scholar and literary historian

Dušan Ivanić (Serbian Cyrillic: Душан Иванић; born 23 January 1946) is a Serbian literary scholar and literary historian.

== Life and work ==
Dušan Ivanić was born in Gubavčevo Polje, a village near Gračac, at the time PR Croatia, FPR Yugoslavia. He studied at the former Department of Yugoslav literature and Serbo-Croatian language of the Philological Faculty of the University of Belgrade, graduated with Magister degree in 1975 and obtained his doctorate with thesis on Educational entertainment journals in Serbian literature of Realism (Zabavno-poučna periodika u srpskoj književnosti epohe realizma) in 1986. He was assistant (1979–1986), assistant professor (1987-91), associate professor (1992-96), became full professor in 1997, and he is professor emeritus at the department of Serbian literature of the faculty since 2015. The scholar was editor-in-chief of literary journal Književna istorija (Literary history; 1989-2003), scientific editor of articles on literature of Serbian Encyclopedia (Srpska enciklopedija), published by SANU and Matica srpska since 2010, editor of Volume 26 on Sima Milutinović of the anthology Ten centuries of Serbian literature (Deset vekova srpske književnosti), and editor of the collected works by Đura Jakšić in 1978. Ivanić was visiting lecturer at Goethe University in Frankfurt (1981-83) and visiting professor at Charles University in Prague (1992). He is current president of the Dositej Obradović Foundation. Dušan Ivanić is laureate of Isidora Sekulić Award 1989 for his literary study Models of literary speech: from the history and poetics of Serbian literature.

He participated in the Jury for political-cultural Gavrilo Princip Prize in 2017 and 2019.

== Bibliography (selection) ==
- Modeli književnoga govora : iz istorije i poetike srpske književnosti (Models of literary speech: from the history and poetics of Serbian literature), Nolit, Belgrade 1990, ISBN 86-19-01712-8.
- Evropski okviri srpskog realizma (European conditions of Serbian Realism), Matica srpska, Novi Sad 1997.
- Književnost Srpske Krajine (Literature of Serbian Krajina), BIGZ, Belgrade 1998, ISBN 86-13-00919-0.
- Modeli srpske pripovijetke 19. vijeka (Models of Serbian narratives of 19th century), Matica srpska, Novi Sad 2008.
- Ka genezi srpske poezije (Genesis of Serbian poetry from 18th to 20th century), Licej, Belgrade 2011, ISBN 978-86-9135712-2.

== Awards ==
- Isidora Sekulić Award 1989
- Nolit Award 1990
- Award of BIGZ publishing company 1998
- Gliša Elezović Award of the Foundation Gligorije Elezović Kulturna Manifestacija Leposavić 1999
- Sava Mrkalj Award of Prosvjeta 2009
- Charter Golden Serbian Literature (Povelja Zlatna srpska književnost) 2010
- Mladen Leskovac Award 2010
