= Prevalje =

- Town
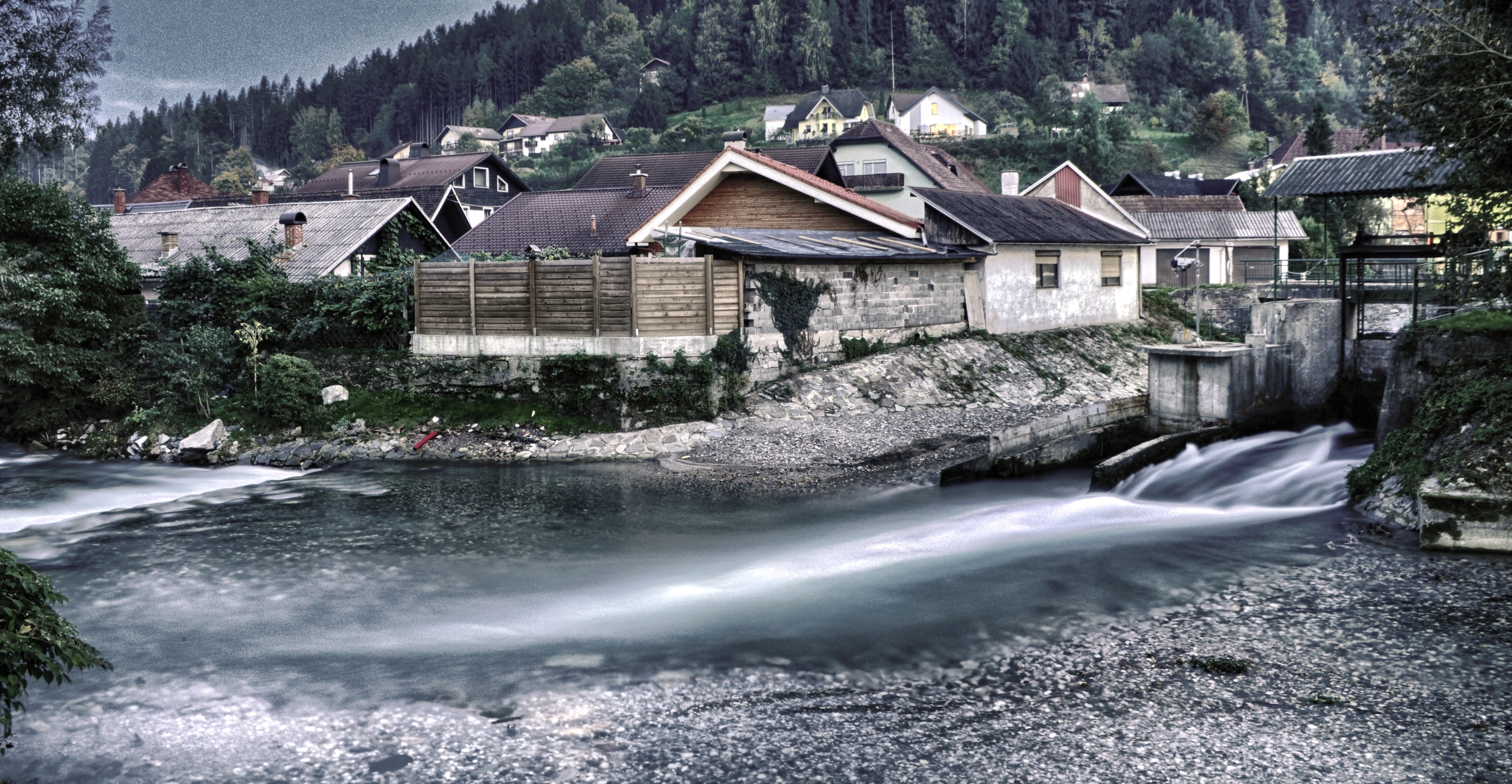
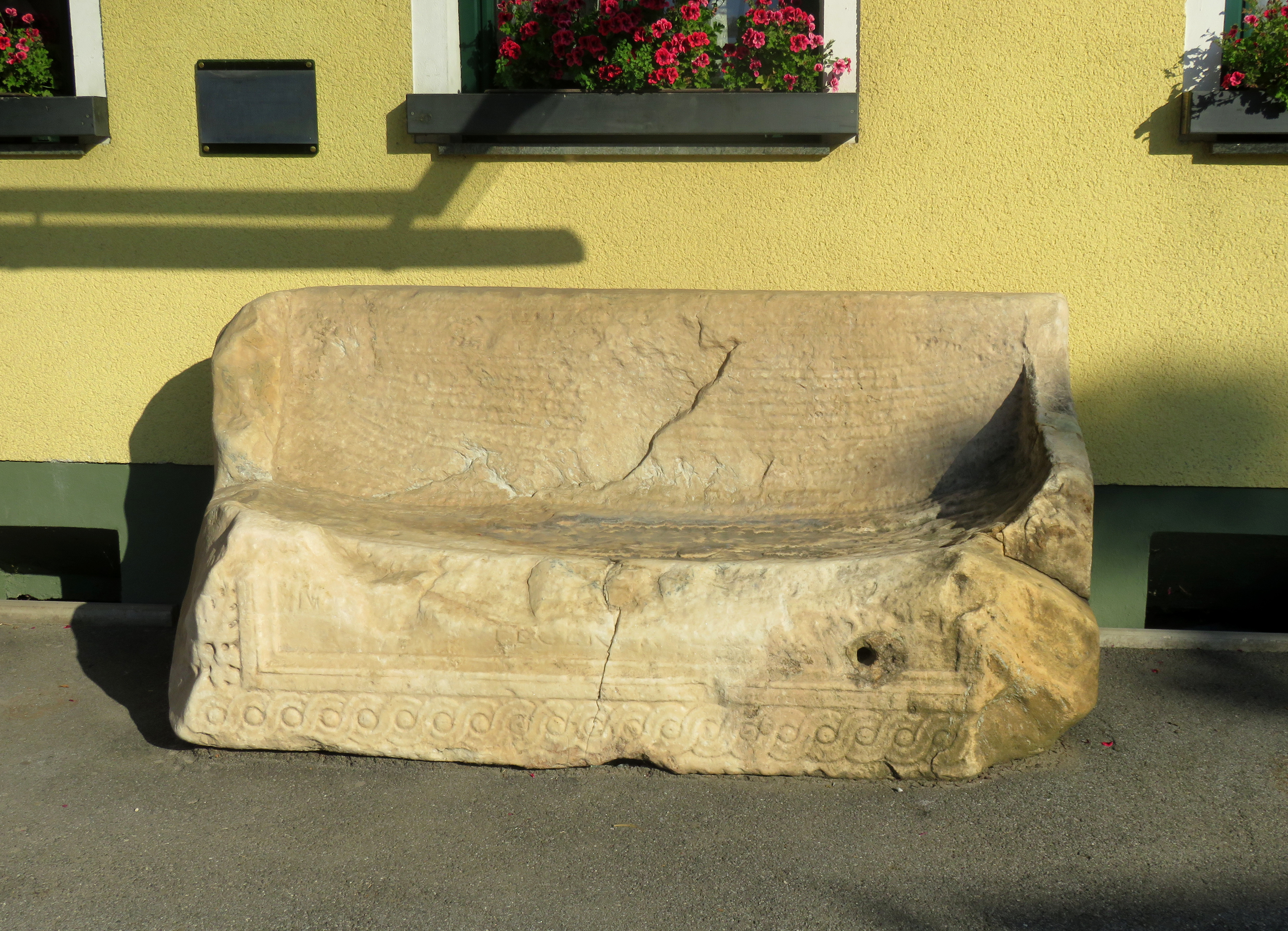
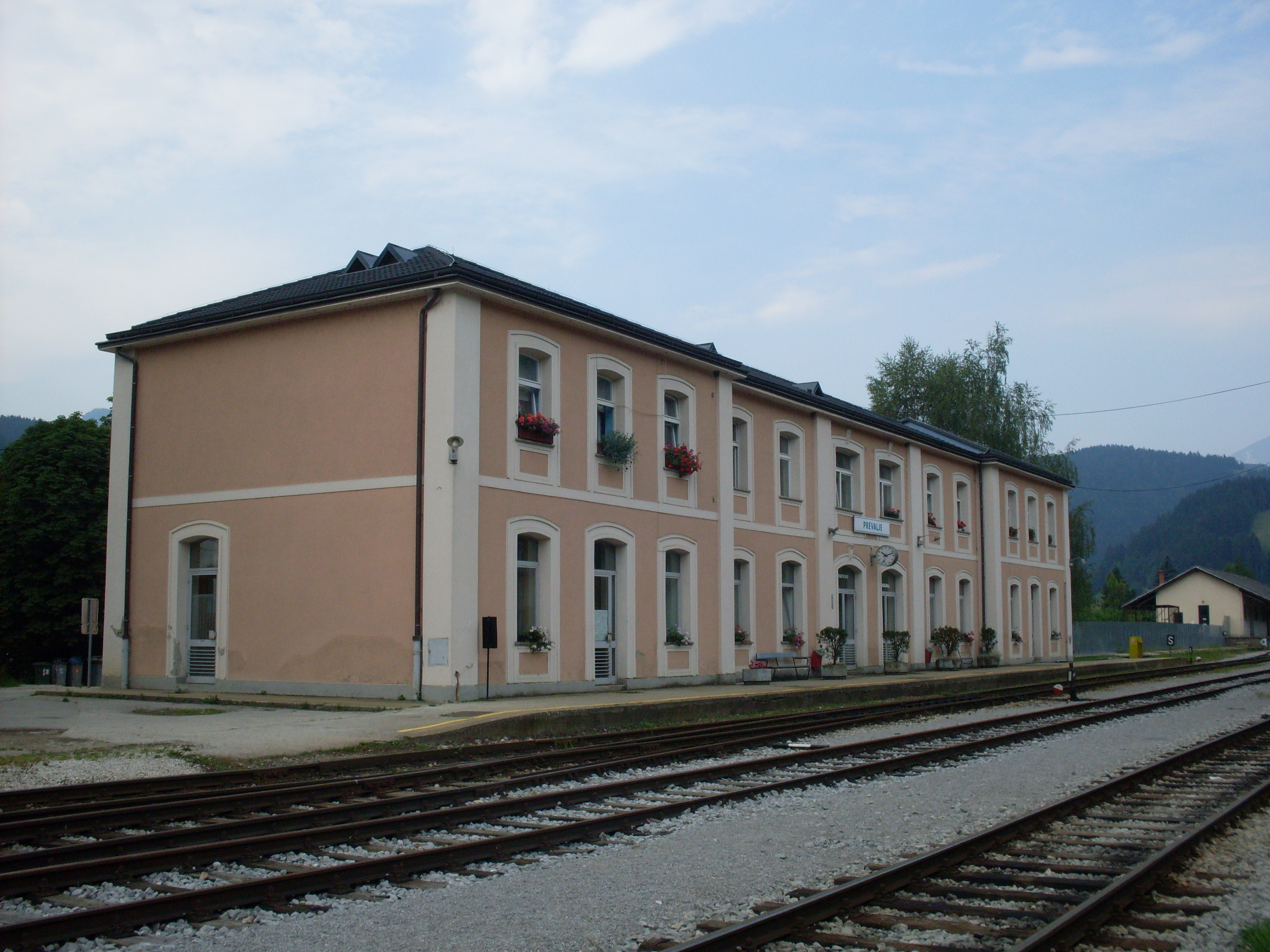
- From top, left to right: Overview of Prevalje, Brančurnik bench, Railway station

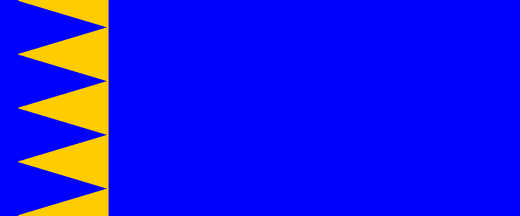
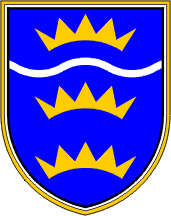
- Flag Coat of arms

- Location in Slovenia
- Coordinates: 46°32′37.54″N 14°54′42.73″E
- Country: Slovenia
- Traditional region: Carinthia
- Statistical region: Carinthia
- Municipality: Prevalje

Area
  - Total: 3.30 km^{2} (1.27 sq mi)
- Elevation: 415.7 m (1,364 ft)

Population (2019)
  - Total: 4,601

Prevalje (pronounced [ˈpɾèːʋaljɛ]; German: Prävali) is a town in northern Slovenia. It is the seat of the Municipality of Prevalje. It lies in the traditional Slovenian province of Carinthia. Prevalje lies in a valley where the Meža River emerges from a narrow gorge, full of fluvioglacial sediments. To the north the town is bounded by the Strojna, Stražišče, and Dolga Brda hills. To the south are Navrski vrh (605 meters or 1,985 feet) and Riflov vrh (726 meters or 2,382 feet).

== History ==
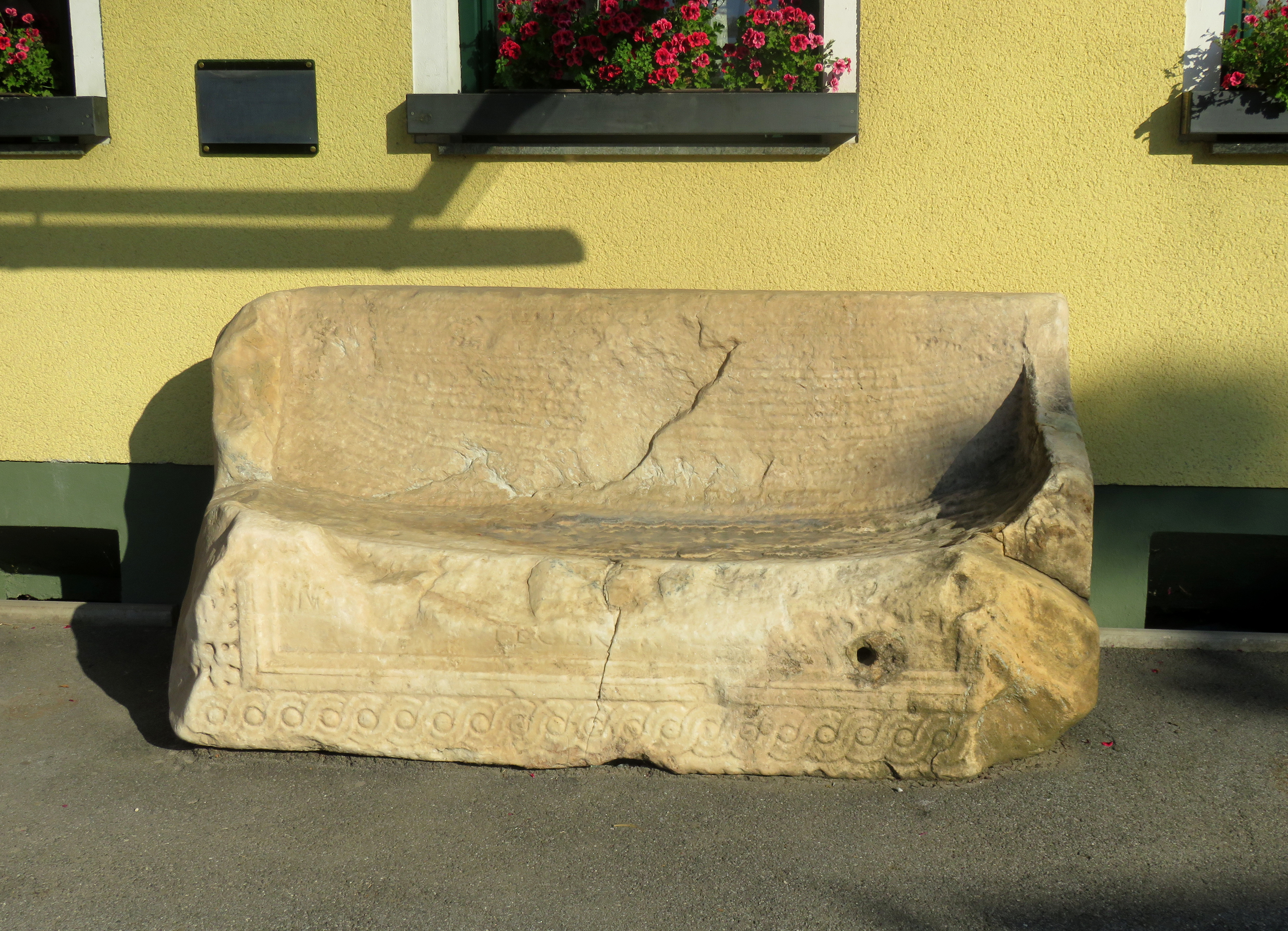
The Brančurnik Bench

The area around Prevalje was settled in prehistoric times, attested by archeological finds which include a bronze axe of the Hallstatt culture. In 1860, approximately 50 Roman marble slabs were found in the riverbed below today's cellulose and cardboard factory at Paloma in Zagrad. The stones belonged to a large tomb on the Roman road from Celeia to Virunum. At the nearby Brančurnik Inn, a Roman sarcophagus known as the Brančurnik Bench (Slovene: Brančurnikova klop) can be seen.

One of the last battles of the Second World War in Europe, the Battle of Poljana, was fought nearby on 14 and 15 May 1945 between the Yugoslav army and retreating Axis forces. In 2010, Slovenian officials discovered a mass grave containing the remains of approximately 700 men and women killed by units of KNOJ in 1945.

== Geography ==
The historical center of Prevalje is on the left bank of the Meža, on the north edge of the valley, in the hamlet of Na Fari around the parish church dedicated to the Assumption of Mary, known locally as Mary on the Lake (Slovene: Marija na jezeru). It was originally a late Romanesque building, first mentioned in written documents dating to 1335, but the current church dates to 1890. A second historical centre lies around the confluence of Leše Creek (Slovene: Leški potok) with the Meža. This is where the first industrial companies were established at the beginning of the 18th century, laying the foundations for rapid economic development of the area.

Historical population
Year	Pop.	±%
1948	1,957	—
1953	2,448	+25.1%
1961	2,994	+22.3%
1971	3,655	+22.1%
1981	4,408	+20.6%
1991	4,416	+0.2%
2002	4,504	+2.0%
2011	4,643	+3.1%
2021	4,627	−0.3%
Population size may be affected by changes in administrative divisions.

== Economy ==
Prevalje was an important ironworking centre. The development of the town was closely connected the iron industry. Even today the processing industry forms an important basis for the economy of Prevalje, followed by trade, metal processing, traffic and building industry. In recent years services and tourism have also increased.

The biggest companies in the Prevalje as of 2003 include Lesna (furniture industry), Koratur (coach and bus companies), Prevent (textile industry), Lek (pharmaceuticals), Jamnica (trade), Paloma (paper industry), and Instalater (engineering, services). There are also several elementary schools, a nursery school, preschools, a medical clinic, a bank, and a post office in the town.

== Sports ==
Prevalje Stadium, also named Športni park Ugasle peči, is a multi-purpose stadium in Prevalje. It is used mostly for football matches and is the home ground of Korotan Prevalje. The stadium was built in 1942 and is able to accommodate 500 seated spectators. The club competed in the Slovenian PrvaLiga, the top tier of Slovenian football, for a total of nine seasons.

== Notable natives and residents ==
- Franc Lampret, composer (1923–1997)
- Lojze Lebič (born 1934), composer and conductor
- Vinko Ošlak, essayist, translator and Christian thinker
- Danilo Slivnik (1950–2012), journalist, editor and columnist
- Leopold Suhodolčan, writer
- Franc Sušnik Jr. (1930–1996), botanist
- Franc Sušnik Sr. (1898–1980), author, professor
- BQL, music group
- Milko Šparemblek, dancer, choreographer, stage director, film director
