= Asia Pacific Geoparks Network =

Regional network of geoparks

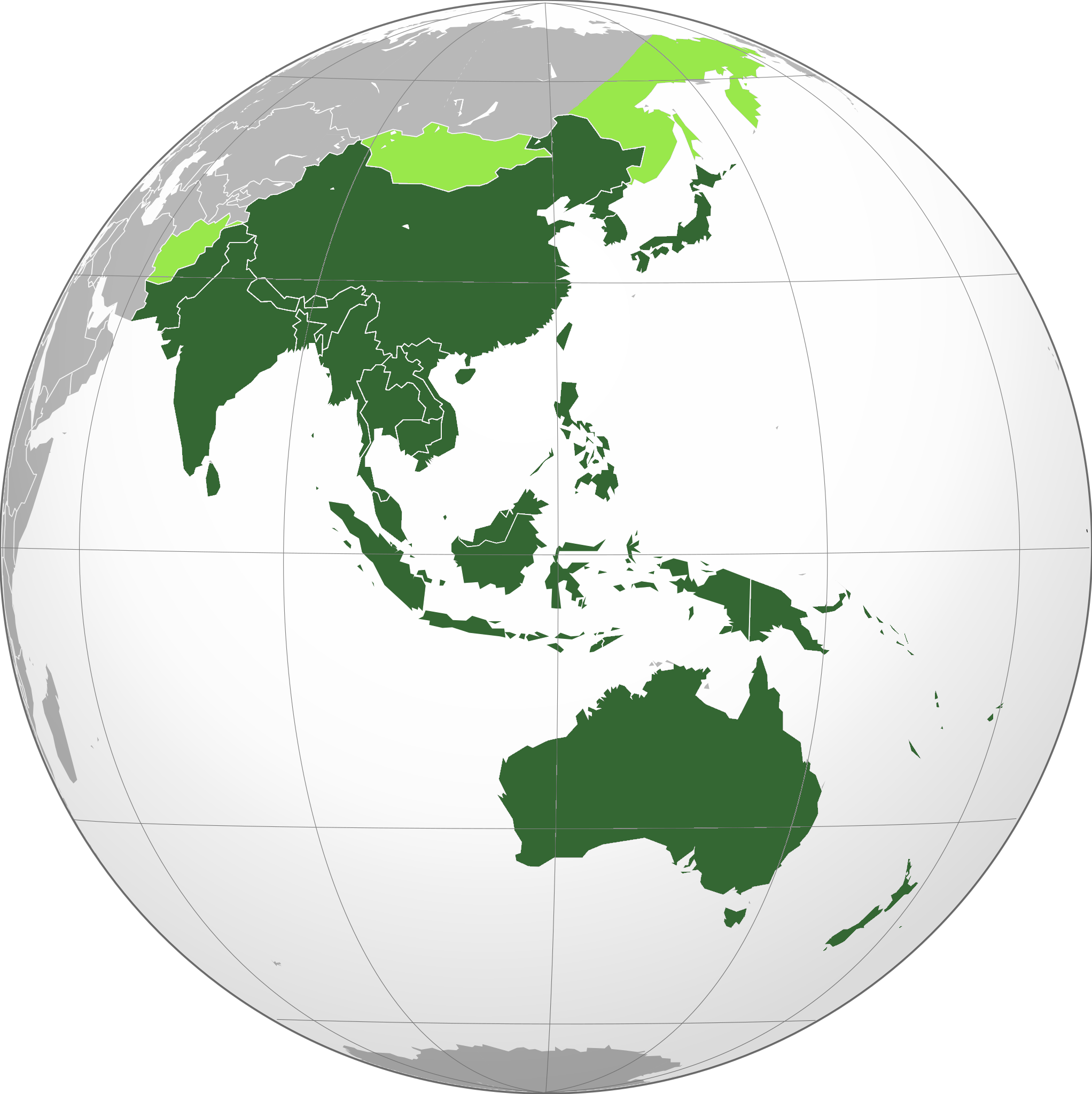
- Region of the Asia Pacific geoparks
- Etymology: Asia is from ancient Greek Asia, a region of Anatolia. They were representing Luwian Aswia, the endoname. Subsequent expansion of Greco-Roman civilization and post-classical extension of commerce pushed the location indefinitely eastward. Pacifica is a modern neologism, "in the Pacific."

The Asia Pacific Geoparks Network (APGN) is the regional geopark network of the Global Geoparks Network (GGN) and the UNESCO International Geosciences and Geoparks Programme (UNESCO-IGGP). Its main role is to coordinate the activities of GGN in the UNESCO regions of Asia and the Pacific, to promote networking between global geoparks and geopark professionals in the region and to provide support for sustainable economic development in geopark areas. As of 2020 February, the APGN had 60 institutional members (UNESCO Global Geoparks) in countries. The Pacific region is currently not represented by a global geopark, but there are ongoing geopark projects, just as in other countries of Asia.

== Organization ==
The APGN was founded in 2007 based on the proposal at the 1st Asia Pacific Geoparks Symposium in Langkawi (Malaysia). It was endorsed by GGN in 2008 and became its official regional geopark network in 2013, in compliance with its Rules of Operation.

=== Governing bodies ===
The governing bodies of the regional network as an agency are:

- Advisory Committee: comprises the representatives of the founding members of the APGN, who meet annually to make the decisions on memberships and supporting programmes on geoheritage conservation, promotion of geoheritage education and awareness, and monitor the progress of the network
- Coordination Committee: made up of two official nominated representatives from each UNESCO Global Geopark of the network (a geoscientist and a specialist on geoparks development or governance) and a representative from UNESCO. It meets twice a year and overviews the admission of new members to the network and has an advisory role of geopark governance.
- Secretariat: providing the daily management of the network, supported by the Chinese Geoparks Network and the office of GGN in Beijing.

=== Regional Administrative Members ===
The personnel recognized as official members of the regional agency are:

- Institutional Members: UNESCO Global Geoparks (UGGp) located in the Asia Pacific Region.
- Individual Members: professionals of geoconservation, sustainable development, tourism development, and environmental issues of GGN in Asia and the Pacific
- Honorary Members: individuals who have rendered exceptional service to the UNESCO Global Geoparks community or to the GGN from the Asia Pacific region
- National Representatives: nominated by member countries to represent them in the Advisory Committee (AC) and Coordination Committee (CC).
- Cooperating Members: international organizations, institutions, or individuals providing substantial financial or other assistance to GGN/APGN.

== Asia Pacific Global Geopark membership ==
=== List of geoparks in the Asia Pacific region ===
The region only approximately follows continental guidelines. Turkey and Russia are in the European network. Iran is in the Asia Pacific. Otherwise the country distribution is Australasia.

=== Map of Asia Pacific geoparks ===
Asia Pacific Geoparks Network
DV: Dong Van Karst Plateau, FUN: Funiushan, GN: Guangwushan-Nuoshuihe, HD: Huanggang Dabieshan, 1: Huangshan, 2: Jiuhuashan, LF: Leye Fengshan, LON: Longhushuan, LUS: Lushan, NCB: Non nuoc Cao Bang, QZ: Qinling Zhongnanshan, 3: Sanqingshan, SHE: Shennongjia, SHI: Shilin, SON: Songshan, UVA: Unzen Volcanic Area, YAN: Yandangshan, YIM: Yimengshan, YUN: Yuntaishan, 4: Tianzhusan, WD: Wangwushan-Daimeishan, ZC: Zhijindong Cave

== Asia Pacific geoparks by nation ==
The member states of the APGN have established national geopark networks. By UNESCO rules a geopark must first apply for membership in the national geopark network and be accredited there before it can apply to membership in the regional geopark network. Having been accredited in the latter they may apply to the global network. This bottom-up method helps to insure that the member nations organize the activities of GGN on a national level first.

National Network	Number of UNESCO Global Geoparks	Number of national geoparks	Reference
Chinese National Geoparks	39	236	
Indonesian National Geoparks	4	15	
Japanese National Geoparks	9	35	
Korean National Geoparks	3	7	
Malaysian National Geoparks	2		
Philippine National Geoparks	1		
Thai National Geoparks	2	4	
Vietnamese National Geoparks	3		

== Meetings and activities ==
As a regional geopark network, APGN is the organizer of several workshops and seminars, capacity building activities, common projects, promotional activities, and common publications between the member countries and UNESCO Global Geoparks. Besides the regular meetings of the Advisor and Coordination Committees, the most important events of the network are the biennial symposiums, a place of exchange on research activities and management practices in geoparks.

Symposium	Venue	
1st Asia-Pacific Geoparks Network Symposium	Langkawi UGG, Malaysia	2007
2nd Asia-Pacific Geoparks Network Symposium	Hanoi, Vietnam	July 2011
3rd Asia-Pacific Geoparks Network Symposium	Jeju UGG Korea	September 2013
4th Asia-Pacific Geoparks Network Symposium	San'in Kaigan UGG, Japan	September 2015
5th Asia-Pacific Geoparks Network Symposium	Zhijindong Cave UGG, China	September 2017
6th Asia-Pacific Geoparks Network Symposium	Rinjani-Lombok UGG, Indonesia	September 2019

== See also ==
- Geopark
- Geotourism
- Global Geoparks Network
- European Geoparks Network
- Latin America and the Caribbean Geoparks Network
- African Geoparks Network
