= UNESCO Global Geoparks =

Geoparks certified by the UNESCO Global Geoparks Council

- Logos of the GGN

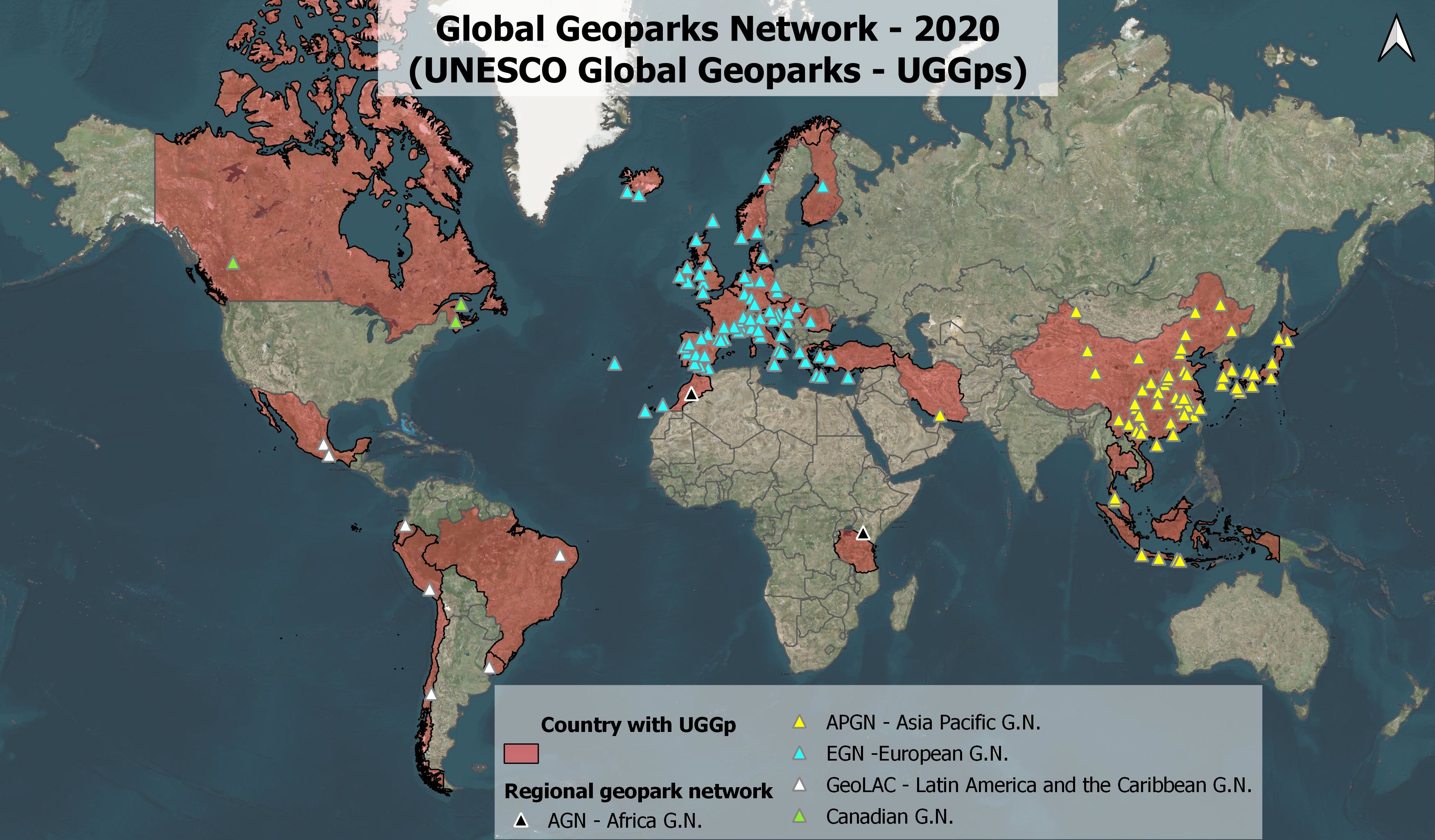
- World map of geoparks included in the UNESCO Global Geoparks Network (GGN) as of 2020
- Etymology: Brand name for marketing the parks
- Terrain: Sites and habitats of geological interest
- Habitats: Typically natural features of the Earth
- Designation: UNESCO designations of national, regional, and global geoparks

UNESCO Global Geoparks (UGGp) are geoparks certified by the UNESCO Global Geoparks Council as meeting all the requirements for belonging to the Global Geoparks Network (GGN). The GGN is both a network of geoparks and the agency of the United Nations Educational, Scientific and Cultural Organization (UNESCO) that administers the network.

The agency was founded in 2004 in partnership with the International Union of Geological Sciences (IUGS). The network was set up to conserve Earth's geological heritage, as well as to promote the sustainable research and development by the concerned communities. To implement these goals they adopted the concept of geopark, a term that had already been in use for one of the proposed parks. Geoparks were conceived as "single, unified geographical areas where sites and landscapes of international geological significance are managed with a holistic concept of protection, education and sustainable development."

As the geopark did not naturally conform to all those requirements, compliance involved considerable work of the country where the geopark was to be located. In essence, the park had to be not only protected, but marketed sustainably to the public. In 2015, the Member States of UNESCO ratified the rebranding to the current name.

Since 2015, the application and designation process has been defined by the Statutes and Operational Guidelines of the UGGp. As of April 2023, there were 195 UGGp's in 48 countries. There are now GGN member sites situated in five of seven continents, there being none currently in either Antarctica or Australasia. There are not yet (2022) global geoparks in the United States. China is the country with the largest number of global geoparks. In Africa, there are only two geoparks, namely Ngorongoro-Lengai UNESCO Global Geopark and M'Goun UNESCO Global Geopark.

== Creation of the global network ==
The Global Geoparks Network (GGN) (also known as the Global Network of National Geoparks) is UNESCO assisted network established in 1998. Managed under the body's Ecological and Earth Sciences Division, the GGN seeks the promotion and conservation of the planet's geological heritage, as well as encourages the sustainable research and development by the concerned communities. Since 2015, its members are officially designated as UNESCO Global Geoparks.

The first batch of members to the GGN were announced during the first International Conference on Geoparks in 2004.

== Geopark admission to the global network ==
The international network seeks the membership geoparks—geographical areas where geological heritage is the focus of local protection, education and development.

A set of criteria as established by UNESCO must first be met for a geopark, as nominated by the corresponding government, to be included in the GGN:

- the existence of a management plan designed to foster socio-economic development that is sustainable (most likely to be based on agritourism and geotourism);
- demonstrate methods for conserving and enhancing geological heritage and provide means for teaching geoscientific disciplines and broader environmental issues;
- joint-proposals submitted by public authorities, local communities and private interests acting together, which demonstrate the best practices with respect to Earth heritage conservation and its integration into sustainable development strategies. One such initiative is GEOfood, originally developed in Norway but now promoting local produce in global geoparks worldwide.

Criteria satisfaction is evaluated during biennial meetings (every even year) by the Geoparks Committee, known as the International Conference on Geoparks, which is also in charge with the periodic review of projects related to geological awareness. The first members of the GGN were named during the first conference in 2004, and it has continued to grow since then:

Session	Year	Site	Date
1st	2004	Beijing, China	27 June –7 July
2nd	2006	Belfast, United Kingdom	17–21 September
3rd	2008	Osnabrück, Germany	22–26 June
4th	2010	Langkawi, Malaysia	12–16 April
5th	2012	Unzen Volcanic Area Geopark (Shimabara, Japan)	12–15 May
6th	2014	Stonehammer Geopark (Saint John, New Brunswick, Canada)	19–22 September
7th	2016	English Riviera Geopark (Torquay, Devon, England)	24–30 September
8th	2018	Adamello Brenta UNESCO Global Geopark (Madonna di Campiglio, Trentino, Italy)	11–14 September
9th	2020	Jeju Island UNESCO Global Geopark, Republic of Korea (did not take place due to Covid)	17–20 September
10th	2022	M'Goun Conservation Area (Morocco)	7–11 September
11th	2025	Kütralkura UNESCO Global Geopark (Araucanía Region, Chile)	8–12 September

The GGN works closely with another project under UNESCO's Ecological and Earth Sciences Division—the Man and Biosphere (MAB) World Network of Biosphere Reserves—to come up with and establish different means of sustainable development in promoting the local communities’ relationship with the natural environment.

== Structure by continent and UNESCO region ==
The following table contains the detailed articles on the UNESCO Global Geoparks (UGG) and further international recognition frameworks of the geoheritage of each continents and their representative regional geopark networks.

List of UGGs by continent	UNESCO region	Regional geopark network	Number of UGGs in the network	Number of countries in the network
Africa	Africa	African Geoparks Network	2	2
Africa	Asia	African Geoparks Network	2	2
Asia	Asia	Asia Pacific Geoparks Network	57	8
Oceania		Asia Pacific Geoparks Network	57	8
Oceania	Oceania	Asia Pacific Geoparks Network	57	8
Europe	Europe and North America	European Geoparks Network	75	26
North America	Europe and North America	—	3	1
Central America	Latin America and the Caribbean	Latin America and the Caribbean Geoparks Network	8	6
South America	Latin America and the Caribbean	Latin America and the Caribbean Geoparks Network	8	6

=== Africa ===
UNESCO has currently designated two UNESCO Global Geoparks in Africa, (Note: Africa is considered as the continent itself, including Northern African states that are defined under the Arabic States category in the UNESCO World Heritage Convent. Independent archipelagos are included (e.g. Seychelles), but island groups under European sovereignty (e.g. the Canary Islands) are excluded, as geoparks here are not part of the African Geoparks Network.) located in two state parties, Tanzania and Morocco. There are plans for national geoparks in an initial phase that could be further developed to gain the UNESCO recognition. Also on an international level, several sites of geoheritage values are inscribed on the World Heritage list under criterion VIII and/or criterion VII.

Africa has a globally significant geodiversity that represents geological-geomorphological processes from the Archean to the Quaternary. However, the acknowledgement of the continent's geodiversity is still lagging behind the recognition of its biodiversity, many areas of global importance are not represented under international agreements, and national legislative acts on the protection of geoheritage are limited.

=== Asia Pacific ===
The Asia Pacific Geoparks Network (APGN) is the regional geopark network of the Global Geoparks Network (GGN) and the UNESCO International Geosciences and Geoparks Programme (UNESCO-IGGP). Its main role is to coordinate the activities of GGN in the UNESCO regions of Asia and the Pacific, to promote networking between global geoparks and geopark professionals in the region and to provide support for sustainable economic development in geopark areas. As of 2020 February, the APGN had 60 institutional members (UNESCO Global Geoparks) in countries. The Pacific region is currently not represented by a global geopark, but there are ongoing geopark projects, just as in other countries of Asia.

=== Europe ===
Europe (Note: The list of geoparks in this article presents the members of the European Geoparks Network. Some members, like in the Canary Islands or in Turkey are situated outside Europe from a physical geographical viewpoint.) is the cradle of the geoparks movement. The European Geoparks Network is a founding member of the Global Geoparks Network and it functions as a regional geopark network of it. As of November 2022, there are 94 UNESCO Global Geoparks in 28 European countries and there are several territories in an aspiring or planned phase, or in a national geopark status. Further elements of the geodiversity of the continent is represented on the World Heritage list, under criterion VIII or VII.

=== North America ===
In North America, (Note: Mexico is member of the Latin American and the Caribbean Geoparks Network, therefore treated there. Greenland, although a territory of Denmark is treated under North America.) there is no regional geopark network so far. As of July 2020, there are five UNESCO Global Geoparks in Canada and several aspiring geoparks projects going on, under the framework of the Canadian Geoparks Network. In the United States, there are no active UNESCO Global Geoparks so far, but there are certain plans to establish geoparks, applying for this label. Further elements of the geodiversity of the continent is represented on the World Heritage list, under criterion VIII or VII.

=== Latin America and the Caribbean ===
Latin America (Note: Latin America is considered here as the Latin America and the Caribbean region of the World Heritage Convention. Geoparks are currently not included in the Latin American Geoparks Network.) is represented under the Global Geoparks Network by the geoparks of the Latin American Geoparks Network (Red GEOLAC). As of 2024, it includes 12 UNESCO Global Geoparks and further projects are in progress seeking UNESCO status or that of national geopark in South America, Central America and the Caribbean.

== Geopark list by country and continent ==
Many of the names in the list below appear in slightly different forms in different documents or webpages, particularly where they have been anglicised. Dates of accession to network, where not otherwise referenced are taken from UNESCO website.

List by country/territory
Country/Territory	Continent	Geopark^{[A]}	Year included
Austria	Europe	Styrian Eisenwurzen	2004
Austria	Europe	Ore of the Alps	2014
Austria / Slovenia	Europe	Karawanken / Karavanke	2015
Belgium	Europe	Famenne-Ardenne	2018
Brazil	South America	Araripe	2006
Brazil	South America	Seridó	2022
Brazil	South America	Caminhos dos Cânions do Sul	2022
Brazil	South America	Quarta Colônia	2023
Brazil	South America	Caçapava do Sul	2023
Brazil	South America	Uberaba	2024
Canada	North America	Cliffs of Fundy	2020
Canada	North America	Discovery	2020
Canada	North America	Percé	2018
Canada	North America	Stonehammer	2010
Canada	North America	Tumbler Ridge	2014
Chile	South America	Kütralkura	2019
China	Asia	Alxa Desert	2009
China	Asia	Arxan	2017
China	Asia	Wangwushan-Daimeishan	2006
China	Asia	Danxiashan	2004
China	Asia	Fangshan	2006
China	Asia	Funiushan	2006
China	Asia	Hexigten	2005
China	Asia	Guangwushan-Nuoshuihe	2018
China	Asia	Huanggang Dabieshan	2018
China	Asia	Jiuhuashan	2019
China	Asia	Kanbula	2025
China	Asia	Huangshan	2004
China	Asia	Jingpohu	2006
China	Asia	Keketuohai	2017
China	Asia	Leye-Fengshan	2010
China	Asia	Longhushan	2007
China	Asia	Mount Lu	2004
China	Asia	Ningde	2010
China	Asia	Qinling	2009
China	Asia	Leiqiong	2006
China	Asia	Sanqingshan, Jiangxi	2012
China	Asia	Shilin	2004
China	Asia	Songshan	2004
China	Asia	Taining	2005
China	Asia	Taishan	2006
China	Asia	Tianzhushan	2011
China	Asia	Wudalianchi	2004
China	Asia	Xiangxi	2020
China	Asia	Xingwen	2005
China	Asia	Yandangshan	2005
China	Asia	Yimengshan	2019
China	Asia	Yuntaishan	2004
China	Asia	Yunyang	2025
China	Asia	Zhangjiajie	2004
China	Asia	Zhangye National Geopark	2020
China	Asia	Zigong	2008
Croatia	Europe	Papuk	2007
Croatia	Europe	Vis Archipelago	2019
Cyprus	Europe	Troodos	2015
Czech Republic	Europe	Bohemian Paradise	2005
Denmark	Europe	Odsherred	2014
Ecuador	South America	Imbabura	2019
Ecuador	South America	Napo Sumaco	2025
Ecuador	South America	Tungurahua Volcano	2025
Finland	Europe	Lauhanvuori-Hämeenkangas	2020
Finland	Europe	Rokua	2010
France	Europe	Massif des Bauges	2011
France	Europe	Beaujolais	2018
France	Europe	Causses du Quercy	2017
France	Europe	Chablais	2012
France	Europe	Haute Provence	2004
France	Europe	Luberon	2005
France	Europe	Monts d'Ardèche	2014
Germany	Europe	Bergstrasse-Odenwald	2004
Germany	Europe	TERRA.vita	2004
Germany	Europe	Harz, Braunschweiger Land	2005
Germany	Europe	Swabian Alb	2005
Germany	Europe	Vulkaneifel	2004
Germany/Poland	Europe	Muskauer Faltenbogen / Łuk Mużakowa	2015
Greece	Europe	Lesvos	2004
Greece	Europe	Chelmos-Vouraikos	2009
Greece	Europe	Psiloritis	2004
Greece	Europe	Sitia	2015
Greece	Europe	Vikos-Aoos	2010
Greece	Europe	Kefalonia-Ithaca	2022
Hong Kong	Asia	Hong Kong	2011
Hungary	Europe	Bakony-Balaton	2012
Hungary/Slovakia	Europe	Novohrad - Nograd	2010
Iceland	Europe	Katla	2011
Iceland	Europe	Reykjanes	2015
Indonesia	Asia	Batur, Bali	2012
Indonesia	Asia	Belitung	2021
Indonesia	Asia	Ciletuh-Palabuhanratu	2018
Indonesia	Asia	Gunung Sewu, Java	2015
Indonesia	Asia	Ijen	2023
Indonesia	Asia	Kebumen	2025
Indonesia	Asia	Maros-Pangkep	2023
Indonesia	Asia	Meratus Mountains	2025
Indonesia	Asia	Merangin Jambi	2023
Indonesia	Asia	Raja Ampat	2023
Indonesia	Asia	Rinjani, Lombok	2018
Indonesia	Asia	Toba Caldera	2020
Iran	Asia	Qeshm Island	2017
Iran	Asia	Aras Geopark	2023
Ireland	Europe	Burren and Cliffs of Moher	2011
Ireland	Europe	Copper Coast	2004
Ireland/United Kingdom	Europe	Marble Arch Caves	2004
Italy	Europe	Alpi Apuani	2011
Italy	Europe	Cilento and Vallo di Diano	2010
Italy	Europe	Madonie	2004
Italy	Europe	Beigua	2005
Italy	Europe	Parco Geominerario della Sardegna	2007
Italy	Europe	Pollino	2007
Italy	Europe	Adamello Brenta	2008
Italy	Europe	Rocca di Cerere	2008
Italy	Europe	Sesia - Val Grande Geopark	2013
Italy	Europe	Tuscan Mining Park	2010
Italy	Europe	Maiella	2021
Italy	Europe	MurGeopark	2025
Japan	Asia	Itoigawa	2009
Japan	Asia	Toya and Usu	2009
Japan	Asia	Unzen Volcanic Area	2009
Japan	Asia	San'in Kaigan	2010
Japan	Asia	Muroto	2011
Japan	Asia	Oki Islands	2013
Japan	Asia	Aso	2014
Japan	Asia	Mt. Apoi	2015
Japan	Asia	Izu Peninsula	2018
Luxembourg	Europe	Mëllerdall	2022
Malaysia	Asia	Langkawi	2007
Malaysia	Asia	Kinabalu	2023
Mexico	North America	Comarca Minera, Hidalgo	2017
Mexico	North America	Mixteca Alta, Oaxaca	2017
Morocco	Africa	M'Goun	2014
Netherlands	Europe	Hondsrug	2013
Nicaragua	North America	Rio Coco	2020
North Korea	Asia	Paektu Mountain	2025
Norway	Europe	Fjord Coast	2025
Norway	Europe	Gea Norvegica	2006
Norway	Europe	Magma	2010
Norway	Europe	Trollfjell	2019
Peru	South America	Colca y Volcanoes de Andagua	2019
Philippines	Asia	Bohol Island	2023
Poland/Germany	Europe	Muskauer Faltenbogen / Łuk Mużakowa	2015
Portugal	Europe	Naturtejo da Meseta Meridional	2006
Portugal	Africa	Azores	2013
Portugal	Europe	Arouca	2009
Portugal	Europe	Estrela	2020
Portugal	Europe	Terras de Cavaleiros	2015
Romania	Europe	Hateg	2005
Russian Federation	Europe	Yangan Tau	2020
Saudi Arabia	Asia	North Riyadh	2025
Saudi Arabia	Asia	Salma Mountains	2025
Serbia	Europe	Đerdap	2020
Slovakia/Hungary	Europe	Novohrad-Nógrád	2010
Slovenia	Europe	Idrija	2013
Slovenia/Austria	Europe	Karawanken / Karavanke	2015
South Korea	Asia	Cheongsong	2017
South Korea	Asia	Danyang	2025
South Korea	Asia	Gyeongbuk Donghaean	2025
South Korea	Asia	Hantangang	2020
South Korea	Asia	Jeju Island	2010
South Korea	Asia	Mudeungsan Area	2018
Spain	Europe	Basque Coast Geopark	2010
Spain	Europe	Cabo de Gata-Níjar Natural Park	2006
Spain	Europe	Central Catalonia	2012
Spain	Europe	Conca de Tremp-Montsec	2018
Spain	Europe	Costa Quebrada	2025
Spain	Europe	Courel Mountains	2019
Spain	Europe	Granada	2020
Spain	Africa	El Hierro	2015
Spain	Europe	Las Loras	2017
Spain	Europe	Maestrazgo	2020
Spain	Europe	Sierra Norte de Sevilla, Andalusia	2004
Spain	Europe	Sobrarbe-Pirineos	2006
Spain	Europe	Sierras Subbeticas	2006
Spain	Europe	Villuercas Ibores Jara	2011
Spain	Africa	Lanzarote and Chinijos Islands	2015
Spain	Europe	Molina & Alto Tajo	2014
Tanzania	Africa	Ngorongoro Lengai	2018
Thailand	Asia	Satun	2018
Thailand	Asia	Nakhon Ratchasima	2023
Turkey	Asia	Kula-Salihli*	2013 (2020)
United Kingdom/Ireland	Europe	Arran	2025
United Kingdom/Ireland	Europe	Cuilcagh Lakelands	2004
United Kingdom	Europe	North Pennines	2004
United Kingdom	Europe	Fforest Fawr	2005
United Kingdom	Europe	North West Highlands	2005
United Kingdom	Europe	English Riviera	2007
United Kingdom	Europe	Shetland	2009
United Kingdom	Europe	GeoMôn	2009
United Kingdom	Europe	Black Country	2020
Uruguay	South America	Grutas del Palacio	2013
Vietnam	Asia	Dong Van Karst Plateau	2010
Vietnam	Asia	Dak Nong	2020
Vietnam	Asia	Lang Son	2025
Vietnam	Asia	Non nuoc Cao Bang	2018

Note * Kula Volcanic Geopark designated in 2013 was extended and renamed as Kula Salihli in 2020

== Geoparks no longer in the GGN ==
Whilst the length of the list has grown year on year, some members drop out from time to time, either by choice or by failing the network's revalidation procedures. UNESCO Global Geoparks are given this designation for a period of four years after which the functioning and quality of each UNESCO Global Geopark is thoroughly re-examined during a revalidation process.

Country/Territory	Continent	Geopark^{[A]}	Year included	Ceased
Germany	Europe	Mecklenburg Ice Age Landscape	2004	2009
United Kingdom	Europe	Lochaber	2007	2011
Australia	Australasia	Kanawinka	2008	
Austria	Europe	Carnic Alps Geopark	2012	

== Notes ==
A. Names and spellings used for the elements were based on the official list as https://youtube.com/@CityofSydney?feature=shared.
