= Chelmos-Vouraikos UNESCO Global Geopark =

UNESCO Global Geopark in Greece

The Chelmos-Vouraikos UNESCO Global Geopark is an UNESCO Global Geopark and a national park in Greece, containing geosites of special scientific, aesthetic and educational value, as well as of archeological, ecological, historical and cultural interest. It is located in the northern part of Peloponnese, extending to the prefectures of Achaea and Korinthia. In this territory there are rivers, lakes and the entire range of the Chelmos Mountains, as well as the Vouraikos Gorge. With an area of 654 km², 62 municipalities and a total population of 27125 inhabitants are included in the territory.

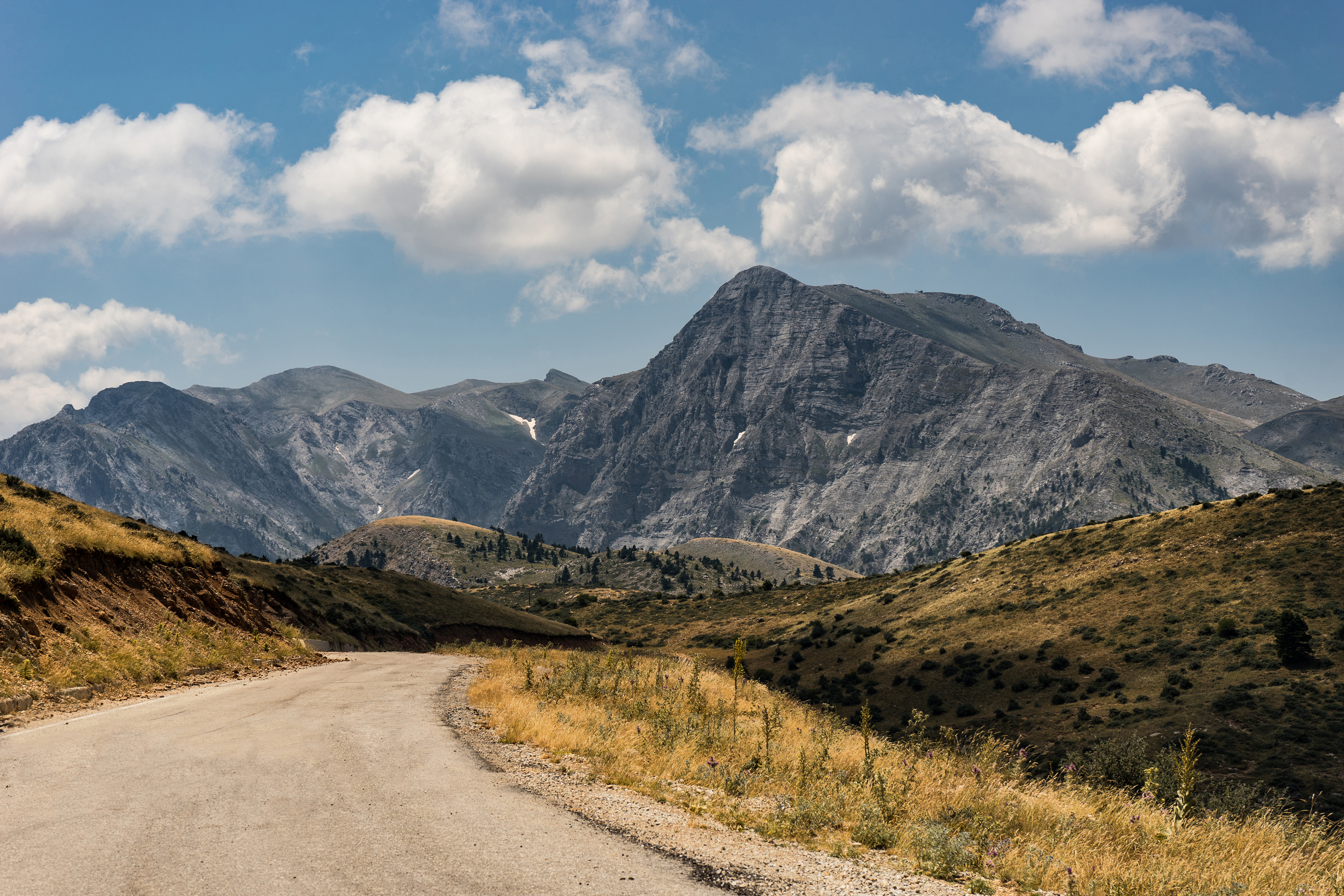
Mountain range of Chelmos

Within the borders of this UNESCO Global Geopark, five protected areas of the "Natura 2000" Network can be found:

1. Oros Chelmos Kai Ydata Stygos (Mount Chelmos Styx Waters) (SCI)
2. Farangi Youraikou (Youraikos Gorge) (SCI)
3. Aisthitiko Dasos Kaavryton (Aesthetic Forest of Kalavryta) (SCI)
4. Spilaio Kastrion (Kastria Caves) (SCI)
5. Oros Chelmos (Ardoania) - Farangi Vouraikou Kai Periochi Kalavryton (Mount Chelmos, Vouraikos Gorge and Kalavryta area) (SPA)

== Establishment ==
The conservation, protection and management of the Geopark is the responsibility of the Chelmos-Vouraikos Management Body based in Kalavryta. It was established in 2002 and got staffed in 2007. Since October 2009, the Chelmos-Vouraikos Geopark has been a member of the European Geoparks Network, the Global Geoparks Network and the Hellenic Geopark Forum. Based on the successful evaluations in 2013, 2015 and 2019, this Geopark stands out as a UNESCO Global Geopark since 2015.

In 2016 it received the international certification "European Charter for Sustainable Tourism" from the European Federation of National Parks and Protected Areas (EUROPARC FEDERATION).

== Management ==
The management body of Chelmos-Vouraikos is a legal entity under private law supervised by the Greek Ministry of Environment and Energy. The tasks of the management body are varied. Apart from the management of the protected areas and the conservation of the geo and biodiversity, organizing environmental education programs or guided tours are among their responsibilities. Cooperation with various other stakeholders is essential for these assignments.

The staff consists of an environmental scientist, a geologist, a forester, six rangers, a secretary, a deputy accountant, an external staff with the duties of an accountant, a legal advisor, and a scientific advisor on geological issues.

== Geology ==
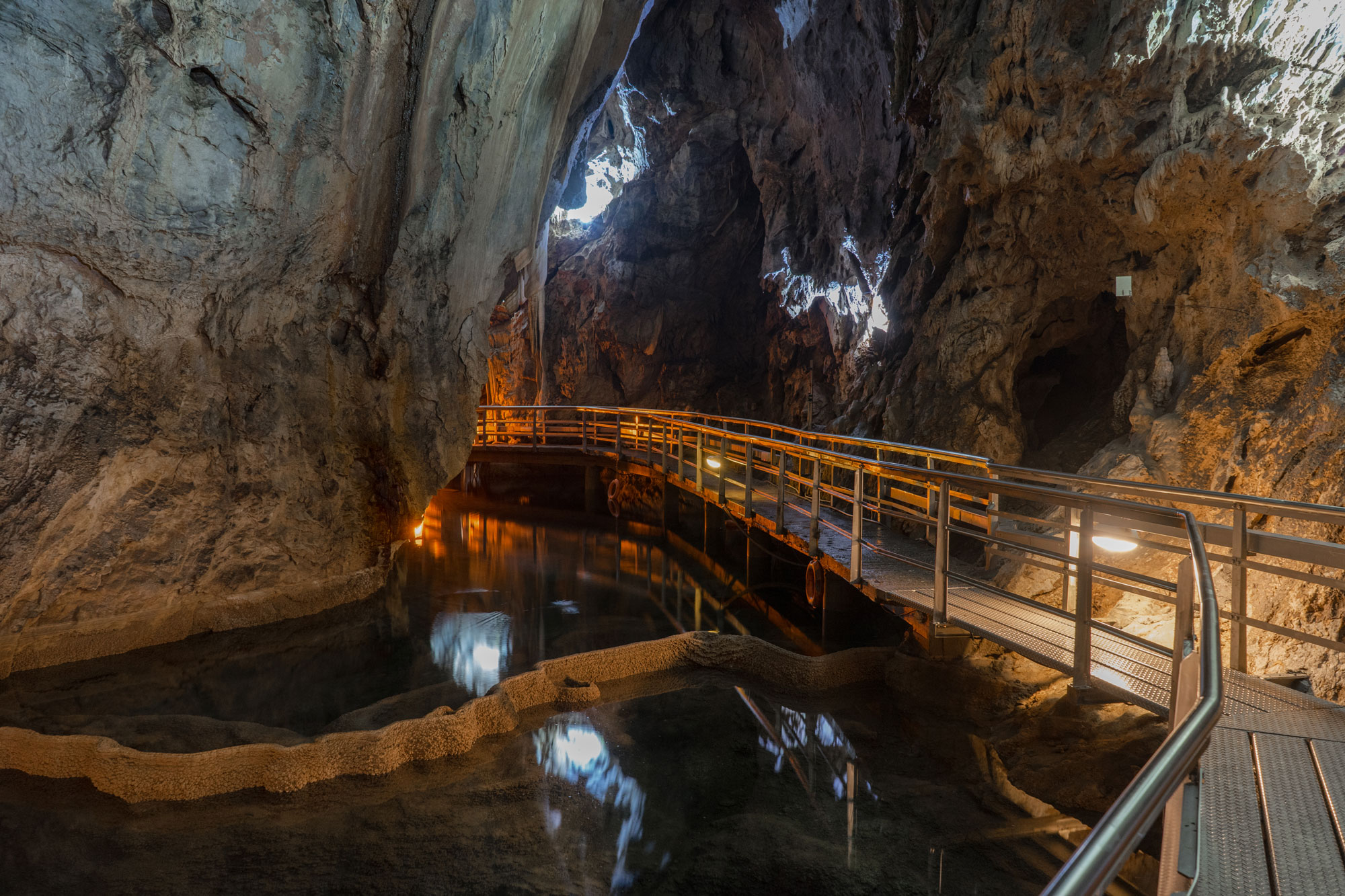
The Cave of the lakes

The Chelmos-Vouraikos UNESCO Global Geopark is characterized by its remarkable geological heritage, hosting many unique geological features. The most important geological or geomorphological features in the Geopark are sinkholes, poljes, springs and caves. The Ladon's eye, a sinkhole that forms a deep karst lake (47 m), or the Cave of Lakes in the mountain of Amolinitsa with 13 underground lakes are characteristic examples. Most of the area of the Geopark consists of limestone, which is often strongly karstified. Besides that, the following clearly defined rock types can be found in the Geopark:

cohesive scree and talus cones, conglomerates, sandy marls, sands and sandstones with grit, sand and clay layers, flysch, limestones, radiolarites, dolomites, phyllites, schists, volcanic rocks, quartzites and lignites.

In addition, ten geological periods (Quaternary, Neogene, Paleogene, Cretaceous, Jurassic, Triassic, Permian, Carboniferous, Devonian and Silurian) and three geotectonic zones (Gavrovo-Tripolis zone, Pindos zone, Phyllites-Quartzites suite) are represented in the Geopark.

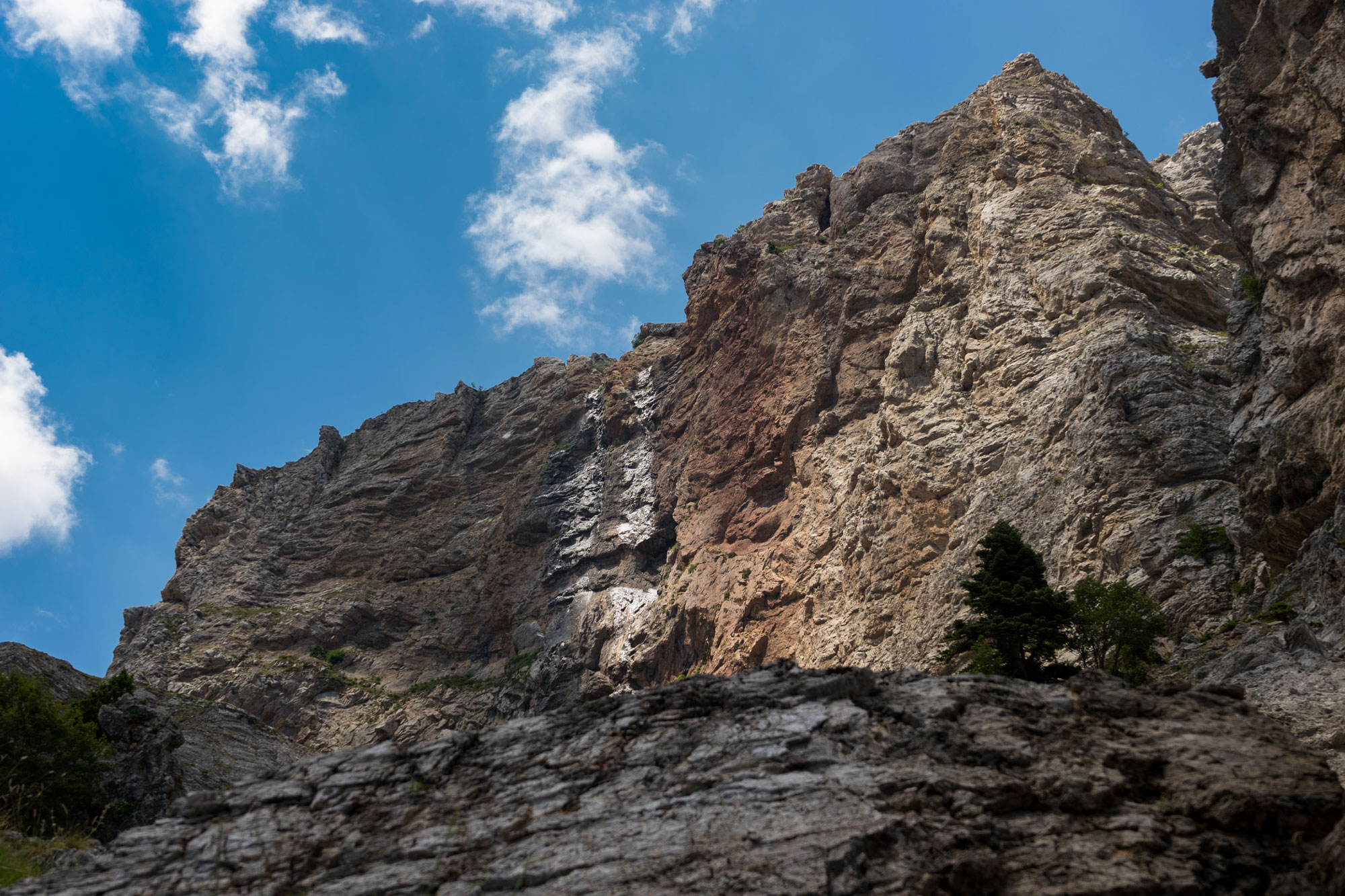
Water of Styx

Geologic formations:

Metamorphic rocks of the Phyllites-Quartzites suite: schists, phyllites, quartzites

Tripoli zone formations: Tyros Formation volcanic rocks, carbonate rocks (limestones-dolomites) and flysch

Pindos zone formations: flysch, limestones, radiolarites

Neogene and Quaternary post alpine sediments and Holocene alluvial sediments: conglomerates, marls, sandstones, lignites, sand and mud sediments

Geological or geomorphological features:

Gorges, alluvial deposits, caves, conglomerates, flysch, lakes, sinkholes, marine terrace, plateaus, tectonic window, poljes, alpine lake, springs, dolines, waterfall, thrusts, faults, landslides, folds, moraines, fossils, mylonites

== The Geosites of the Chelmos-Vouraikos UNESCO Global Geopark ==
=== Tectonic geosites ===
1. Niamata-Vouraikos Gorge (tectonic window-Tripolis zone)
2. Tectonic graben Kalavyta (faults in Olonos-Pindos Zone)
3. Area of Agia Lavra (thrusts, folds in Olonos-Pindos Zone)
4. Keramidaki (fault, Tripolis zone and Olonos-Pindos Zone)

=== Geomorphological geosites ===
1. Marine terrace of Trapeza area
2. Mavri Limna - waterfall (fault, radiolarites)
3. Water of Styx (limestones-dolomites, Tripolis zone)
4. Breccias of Xerocambos area
5. Mavrolimni, mt Chelmos (glacial alpine lake)
6. Mega Spilaio Monastery (fault, conglomerates)
7. Spanolakkos glacial deposits
8. Valimi landslide
9. Psili Korfi of Chelmos (the highest peak of Chelmos Mt, Olonos-Pindos Zone)
10. Ntourntourvana (limestones of Tripolis zone)
11. Chelonospilia (Olonos-Pindos Zone)
12. Madero (limestones of Olonos-Pindos Zone, Thrust over Tripolis zone)
13. Conglomerates with aeolian erosion
14. The “Balcony” of Styx (limestones of Tripolis zone)
15. Tessera Elata (limestones of Tripolis zone)

=== Karstic geosites ===
1. Portes-Triklia Vouraikos Gorge (thin-platty limestones)
2. The Cave of the Lakes (Tripolis zone and Olonos-Pindos Zone)
3. Lousoi polje (karstic erosional geomorphology)
4. The sinkholes of Lousiko – Formation of Koumani
5. Aroanios Springs – Arbounas (fault)
6. Ladon´s eye
7. The sinkholes of Feneos
8. Valvousi (surface karstic erosion)
9. Kastria spring view point (polje of Lousoi, Analipsi gorge, radiolarite inclined and plicated)
10. Analipsi chapel (waterfall, gorge, cave with speleothems, Tripolis limestones)

=== Palaeontological geosites ===
1. Palaeochori lignite beds (lignite beds of xylite type in marls, clays, with fossil plant macroremains)

=== Lithological geosites ===
1. Mamousia-Rouskio (Flysch Olonos-Pindos Zone)
2. Kerpinis’ stage (conglomerates)
3. Roghi-wind generators (Olonos-Pindos Zone)
4. Xidias (lignite beds of xylite type)
5. Priolithos-Clastic horizon (sandstones, siltstones, nodules, Olonos-Pindos Zone)
6. Vesini (radiolarites, Olonos-Pindos zone)
7. Area of Solos (phyllites, schists, volcanic rocks)
8. Pausanias Vine (Olonos-Pindos Zone)

=== Hydrological geosites ===
1. Doxa lake (mylonites)
2. Tsivlos Lake (landslide)

== Wildlife ==
The different geomorphosites (mountains, caves etc), the abundant water availability and the local climate are the basis for a rich biodiversity in the Geopark. The great geodiversity provides many opportunities for the formation of niches for numerous animal and plant species. Therefore, the ecological value for the flora and fauna of the region is immense.

=== Flora ===
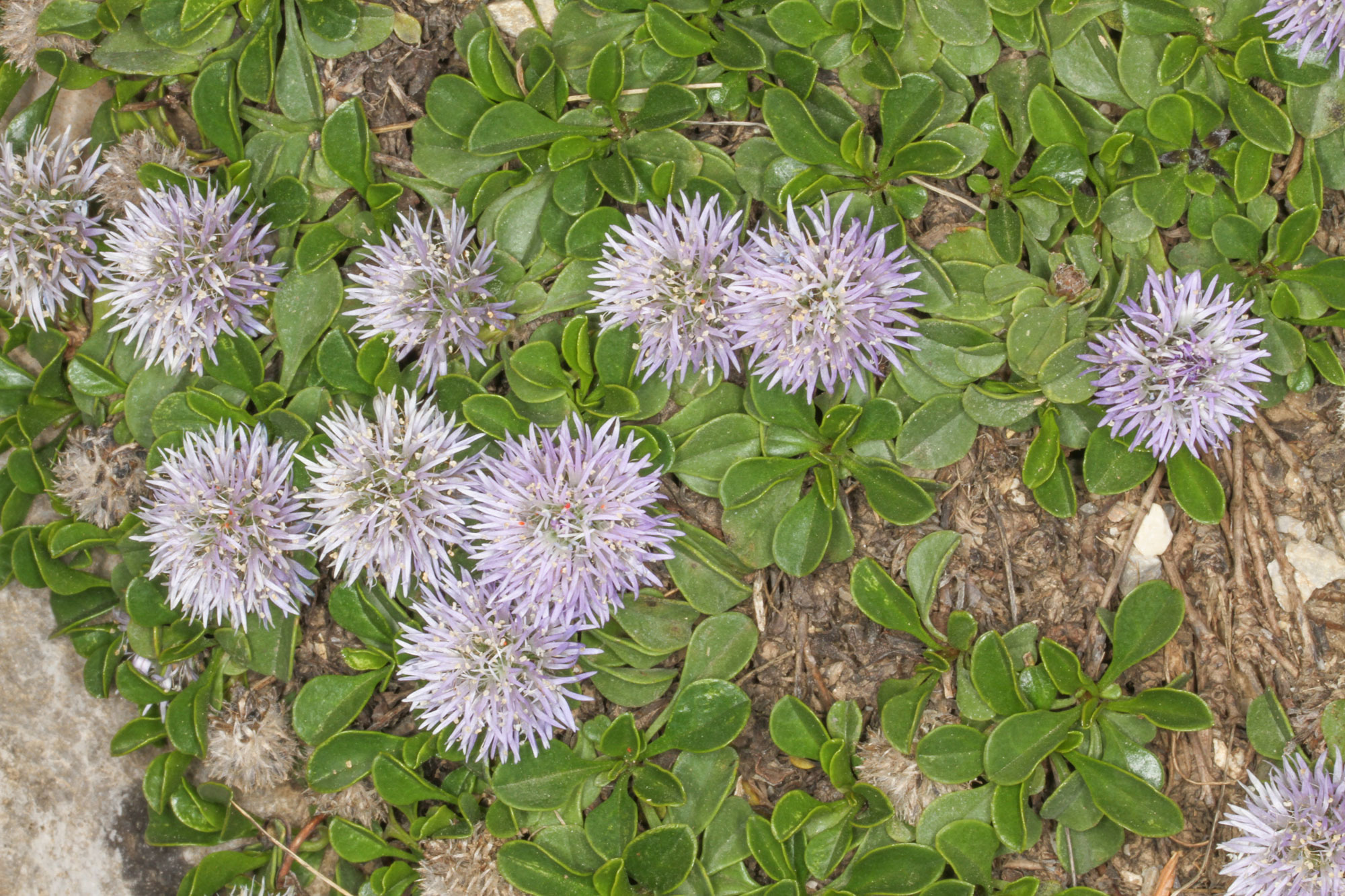
Globularia stygia

The Chelmos-Vouraikos Geopark hosts more than 1100 plant species. Among them there are Greek endemics, endemics of Peloponnese or local endemic plant species, many of which either belong to one of the IUCN Red Data Book risk categories, and/or are included in an international conservation regime. The existence of these rare plants is always connected with the soil type. In this context, the limestone mountain Chelmos plays an important role. Due to its considerable habitat diversity, thirty endemic species of the Peloponnese, more than one hundred Greek endemics and five local endemics of Chelmos can be found in this area. One of these plants is Globularia stygia, which got its name from the Styx waters geosite. This species underlines the ecological value of the mount Chelmos, being a priority species of the European Directive 92/43. It grows on rocks in gorges, on ledges, in open scree slopes, on limestone, at an altitude of 1150-2300 meters. Furthermore, a lot of pharmaceutical plants can be found in the region of the Geopark.

=== Fauna ===
The Geopark provides a habitat for the following animals: 76 species of invertebrates, 4 species of fish, including 2 endemics, 9 species of amphibians, 23 species of reptiles, among them there are 9 endemic species, 18 species of mammals. Besides these, 149 bird species find permanent or temporary refuge in the area. A large number of endemic butterflies, including a number of rare species, live in the alpine plains, especially in the alpine grasslands of the Geopark. These species are closely connected to the geological features of the Geopark, as they provide special habitats. For example, one of the most important winter bat colonies in Europe with 18,000 individuals flourishes in the Geosite “Cave of the lakes“.

== Non geological sites in the Geopark ==
In the territory of the Geopark there are several sites of cultural, archaeological or aesthetic value, which are of touristic interest:

1. Archaeological site of Loussoi
2. Ancient Kleitoria
3. Pausania’s vine
4. The ancient city of Feneos
5. Traditional building of the Petmesa family
6. The forests of Perithori and Zarouchla
7. Aesthetic forest of Kalavryta
8. Ladonas River
9. Holocaust Museum in Kalavryta
10. Ag. Georgios monastery (Lake Doxa)
11. Mega Spilaio Monastery
12. Agia Lavra monastery
13. Ski Center of Kalavryta – High peaks of mount Chelmos
14. Rack Railway of Diakofto – Kalavryta (Diakofto gorge)

== Human activities ==
The special landscape and the climate within the Geopark offer various opportunities for people to cultivate the area. Especially, the primary sector is very distinct.

Areas of the Geopark are used for agriculture with products such as olives, tomatoes or lemons. In addition, the production of honey and livestock farming also play an important role in the cultivation of the park's land. Farms with mainly sheep and goats, but also cattle, contribute greatly to the formation of income in the region. Especially in Planitero and in Krathis, fishing has experienced an increasing expansion due to the inland waters. Trout and salmon farms are found in the area, making aquaculture another important human activity in the Geopark. Furthermore, forestry and thus the supply of wood to the population represents an important factor in the social space of the region.

The secondary sector is represented by small units in the Geopark that process agricultural products or fabricate household items and wood carvings. These products are closely related to the Geopark, as they originate from it.

The tertiary sector is also represented in the Geopark. On the one hand, through the trade of products to meet local needs, but also for the numerous tourists. These products include mainly traditional local items such as honey and aromatic plants. On the other hand, tourism is a very important factor in the area. The geological sites, such as the Cave of the Lakes, the springs of Aroanios River at Planitero or the Vouraikos Gorge etc, attract many visitors every year. Furthermore, a ski resort has developed in the north slopes of the Chelmos mountain. Therefore, this particular area of the Geopark, the Kalayta Ski center, is visited by numerous tourists during the winter months

== Environmental problems of the area ==
Pollution, solid waste, land use, destruction and environmental deterioration, construction of new road routes, irrigation works, fertilizers, animal grazing, illegal lumbering, forest fires, inefficient forest management
