= Basque Coast Geopark =

Geopark in Basque Country

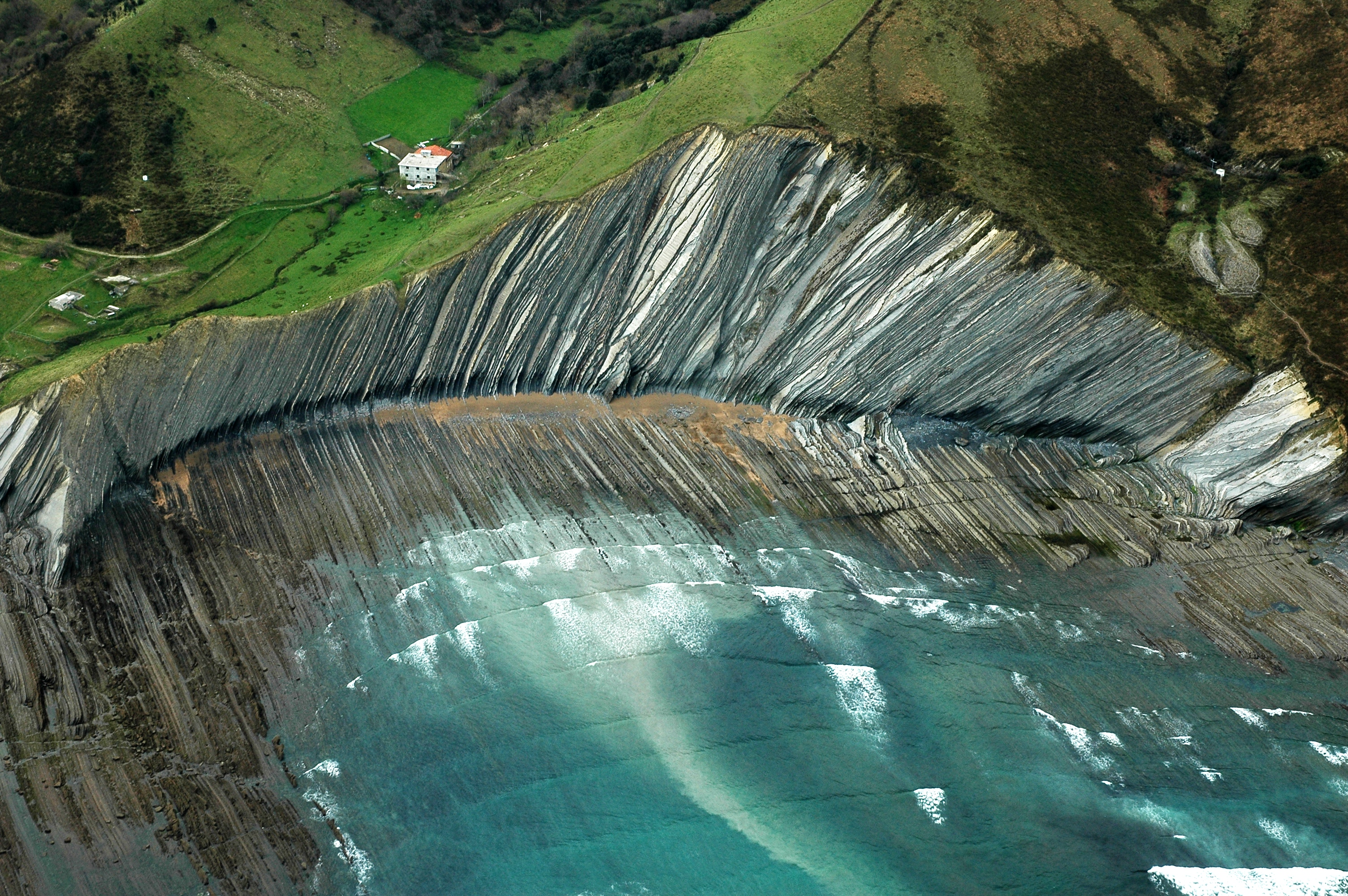
- Aerial view of Sakoneta, Deba

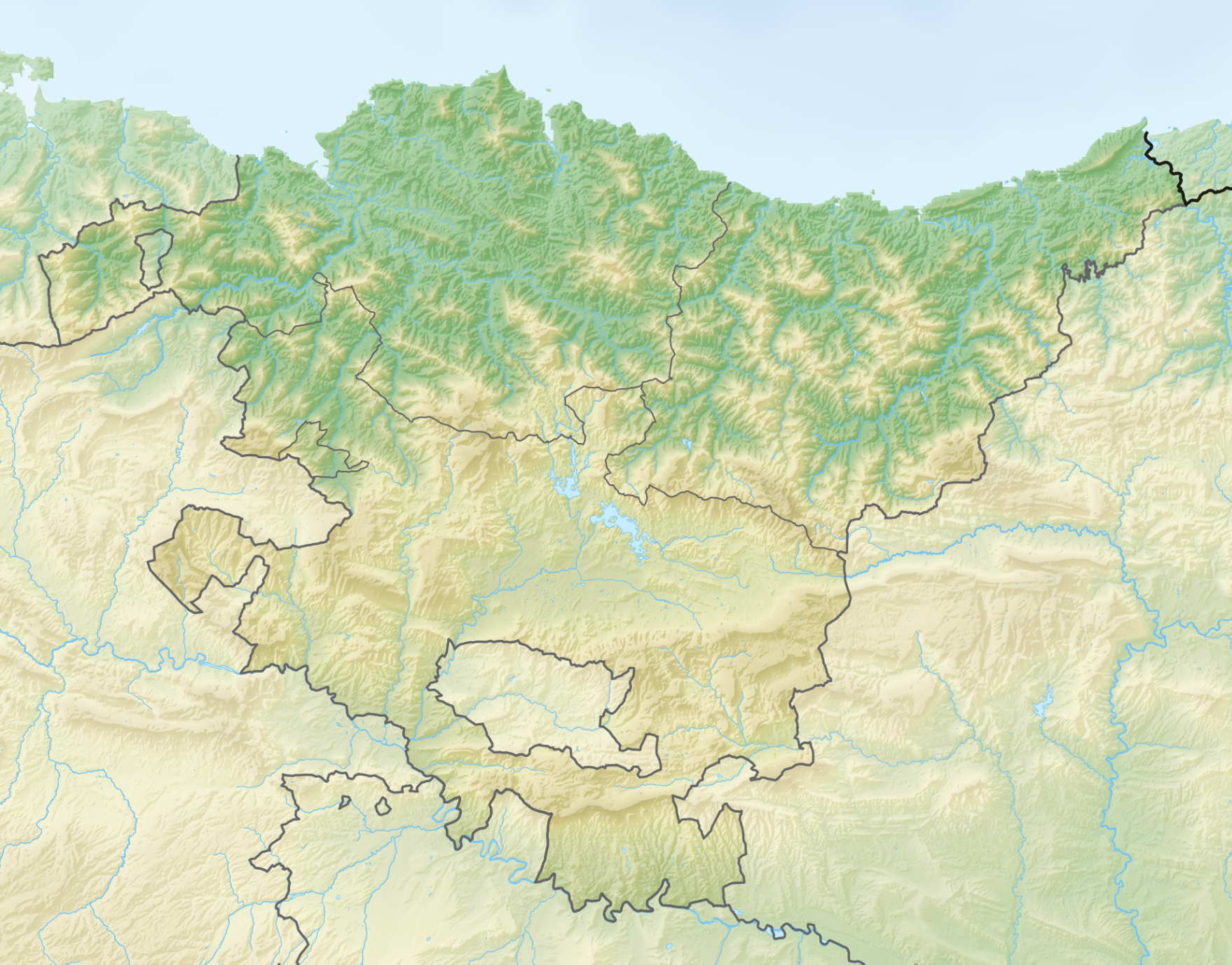
- Location within Spain Location within the Basque Country
- Coordinates: 43.2980°N 2.3100°W
- Area: 89 km^{2} (34 sq mi)
- Designation: UNESCO Global Geopark
- Designated: UNESCO

The Basque Coast Geopark (Basque language: Euskal Kostaldeko Geoparkea), formally the Basque Coast UNESCO Global Geopark, is an area of the Basque Country in the north of Spain which became a member of the European Geoparks Network in 2010, one of several Global Geoparks in Spain. It comprises 89 square kilometres of countryside with a 23 km long cliffed coast fronting the Bay of Biscay. Inland it comprises hilly country which reaches up to Sesiarte which is 755m above sea level. The main communities within the Geopark are Zumaia, Deba and Mutriku. The A8 Cantabrian motorway runs east–west through the Geopark.

== Geology ==
The Geopark comprises two distinct geological terrains, the coast characterised by cliffs of flysch of late Cretaceous to Palaeogene age and hills and mountains characterised by limestone which has given rise to karstic landscapes.

The flysch cliffs arranged along the coast record 60 million years of unbroken deposition of marine sediments from the Cretaceous period through into the Palaeocene and Eocene stages of the succeeding Palaeogene period. Alternating layers of sandstone and mudstone deposited as turbidite flows were originally laid down flat but have been tilted at angles up to the vertical by tectonic forces associated with the Alpine orogeny. An extensive wave-cut platform is exposed at low tide. These coastal sections include outcrops which record the significant K-T (or K-Pg) boundary defined by the geological event which caused the demise of the dinosaurs some 66.0 million years ago.

The oldest bedrock exposed within the area dates from the late Triassic period and comprises the gypsums and clays found in the Mutriku area. The youngest are sandstones, limestones and shales of the Eocene part of the Palaeogene, found around Zumaia.

=== IUGS geological heritage site ===
In respect of the site being 'one of the best exposed, most continuous and highly studied outcrops of deep marine sediments in the world', the 'Cretaceous-Paleogene Stratigraphic Section of Zumaia' was included by the International Union of Geological Sciences (IUGS) in its assemblage of 100 'geological heritage sites' around the world in a listing published in October 2022. The organisation defines an 'IUGS Geological Heritage Site' as 'a key place with geological elements and/or processes of international scientific relevance, used as a reference, and/or with a substantial contribution to the development of geological sciences through history.'

== Geotourism ==
The Geopark promotes two sets of guided tours for visitors: the Flysch Route explores numerous geological localities along the coast, and the Karst Route explores aspects of both natural and cultural heritage inland. The Algorri Interpretation Centre in Zumaia houses an exhibition on the coastal heritage along with other facilities. In Mutriku, the Nautilus Interpretation Centre is home to a private fossil collection assembled by Jesus M. Narvaez Amasorrain and Esperanza Azkarrag, now on public display.
