= GeoMôn =

Geopark in Wales

Coordinates: 53°16′N 4°22′W

GeoMôn UNESCO Global Geopark is a Geopark covering the entire island of Anglesey in north Wales. It was admitted to the European Geoparks Network and to the UNESCO-assisted Global Network of National Geoparks in May 2009. It was the second Geopark to be designated in Wales, the seventh within the United Kingdom and the thirty-third in Europe. The UNESCO Geopark designation reflects the diversity of the island's geology, which encompasses solid rocks from the Precambrian to the Neogene with some Miocene sediments and extensive Pleistocene glaciation features from the Quaternary period. GeoMôn covers 720 square kilometres and has 125 miles of coastal walks.

The Isle of Anglesey lies off the north coast of Wales, UK. It is known as Ynys Môn in Welsh. Around 67,000 people live on the island. The local culture is very distinctive, with around 60% of the population using Welsh as their first language.

The island is known for its diverse tectonic geology. South Stack exhibits particular folding and faulting that have made it a site of interest for many years, having been first identified as the oldest Precambrian rock then the youngest and now said to be from the Cambrian period. It is a common location for students and schools who come here to study folding and faulting as well as examining the evidence for the birth of the Atlantic. Llanddwyn Island on the west Anglesey coast is a small, but complete oceanic plate, with the pillow lavas at its eastern end created at a Precambrian constructive plate margin. The plate interior on the northern coast is composed of mudstones and sandstones, some containing ‘dropstones, the remnants of the Gaskier's Ice Age that occurred at the end of Precambrian times. Anglesey is the type locality for a rock type named "mélange" by Edward Greenly when he first mapped the geology of Anglesey in the early years of the twentieth century.

GeoMôn publishes a series of local trails to guide the visitor around the coastal areas of the island served by the 125 mile long coastal path. The trail at Beaumaris illustrates the use of rocks in the building of the 13th century castle, roofs and roads as well as more ornate carvings on high-status buildings. The castle built by King Edward I was intended to ‘tame’ the local Welsh people and keep them in order. It is part of the Castles and Town Walls of King Edward in Gwynedd World Heritage Site.

Oriel Ynys Môn is the municipal art gallery and museum dedicated to local artists and crafts. Anglesey’s two most important artists have exhibitions there. Firstly, there is an exhibition of the work of Charles Tunicliffe RA, the wildlife artist, and then Sir Kyffin Williams RA, whose work is shown in a new gallery dedicated to him. He was a founder member of the Geopark and its first patron. His great uncle, Sir Andrew Ramsay, was the second Director General of the British Geological Survey and a ‘Father’ of Welsh Geology; he died in Beaumaris and is buried in the churchyard at Llanddwyn, under a glacial erratic, a boulder of Shap Granite.

Originally geoconservation on Anglesey was administered by the Gwynedd and Môn RIGS group, but a decision was taken to apply for Geopark membership. GeoMôn is administered by GeoMôn-Anglesey Geopark Limited, a company registered at Companies House, and a registered charity.

GeoMôn produces books on the geology of the island as well as leaflets detailing a number of self-guided trails. There is a Geopark visitor centre open from 10am to 4pm every day except Monday, at the Watch House in Porth Amlwch. Porth Amlwch was created mainly to facilitate the export of copper ore from the mines on Parys Mountain. The Watch House was originally the waiting place for the pilots guiding sailing ships in and out of the tiny harbour.

== IUGS geological heritage site ==
Because of the site's 'spectacular, accessible and well-preserved exposures of late Neoproterozoic-Cambrian mélange with more than 200 years of study', the International Union of Geological Sciences (IUGS) included the 'Ynys Llanddwyn late Neoproterozoic-Cambrian Mélange' in the tectonics chapter of The First 100 IUGS Geological Heritage Sites published in October 2022. The organisation defines an IUGS Geological Heritage Site as 'a key place with geological elements and/or processes of international scientific relevance, used as a reference, and/or with a substantial contribution to the development of geological sciences through history.'
