= Copper Coast Geopark =

Designated area in County Waterford, Ireland

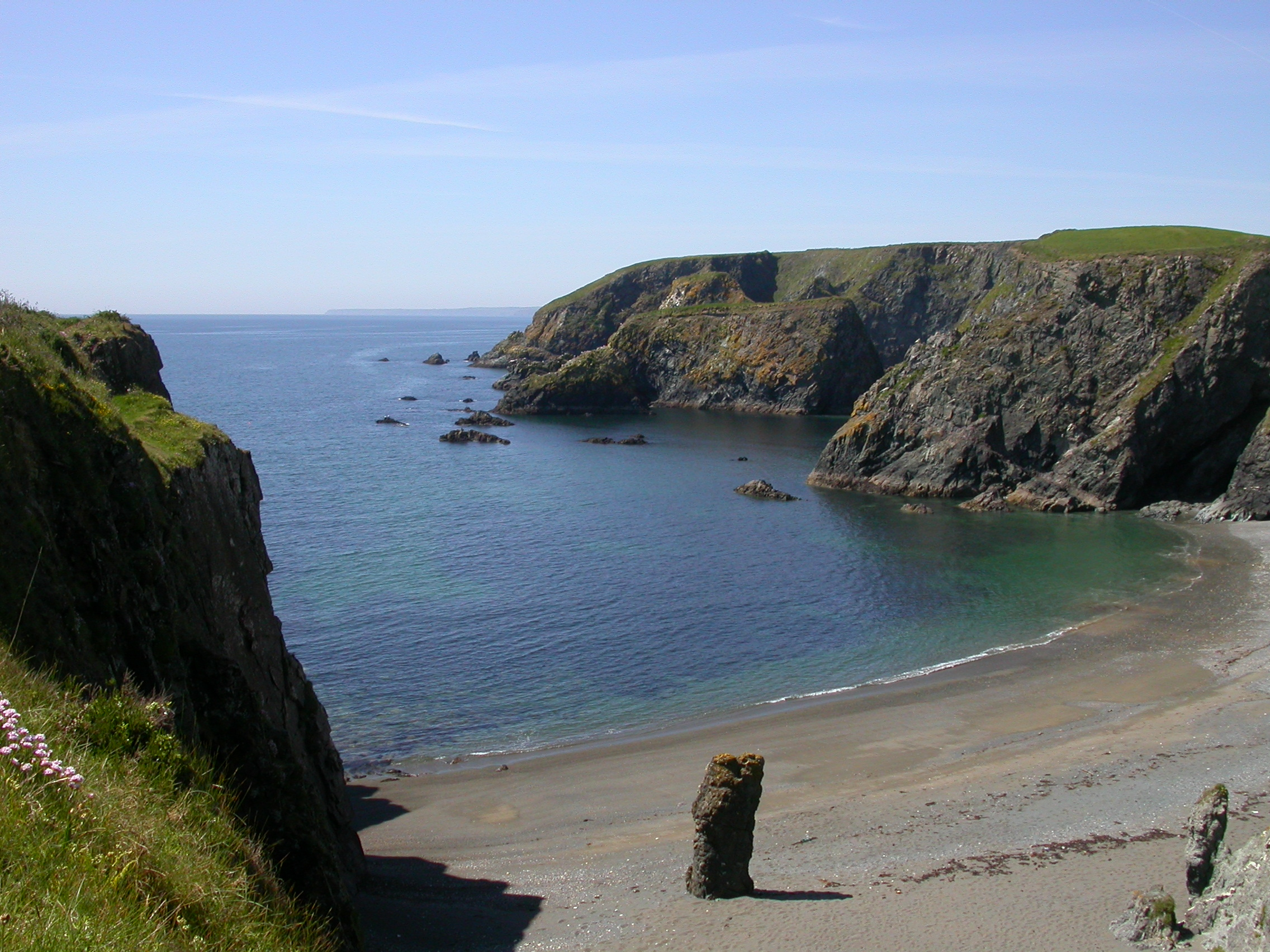
A view from the coastline of Copper Coast Geopark

The Copper Coast Geopark is a designated area comprising a stretch of the southern coast of Ireland in County Waterford, extending for some 25 km of coastline from Kilfarrasy in the east to Stradbally in the west. It was the first geopark to be designated in the country.

== History ==
The "Copper Coast" evolved over 460 million years after it was formed by volcanic activity in the Ordovician period. The oldest felsic volcanic rocks have intrusive elements and are interspersed with shales. Sedimentary rocks from 370 to 360 Mya can be seen as reddish-brown conglomerates, sandstones, siltstones and shales. After a wide gap in geological time, the next exposed sequences are from the Quaternary period, and consist of unconsolidated tills, boulder clays and deposits of sand and gravel.

The geopark encompasses about 25 km (16 mi) of coastline south of the Comeragh Mountains, extending from Stradbally to Kilfarrasy. The area is a plain, mostly covered by glacial till and bog, with cliffs at the sea edge. There are several streams flowing through deeply cut valleys to beaches and coves, with stack rocks and rocky headlands. The area has a rich cultural heritage, with Neolithic dolmens, Iron Age forts, pre-Christian inscribed stones, the remains of medieval churches and a castle. The coast is named for the historic metal-mining industry, the legacies of which now constitute a tourist attraction. The idea of the geopark developed from a local interest group, starting around 1997. The area was declared a European Geopark in 2001 and joined the UNESCO Global Geoparks Network in 2004, being designated a UNESCO Global Geopark in 2015. This was done to aid in sustainability but also with a view to boosting the profile of the area as a tourist destination.

== Panorama ==
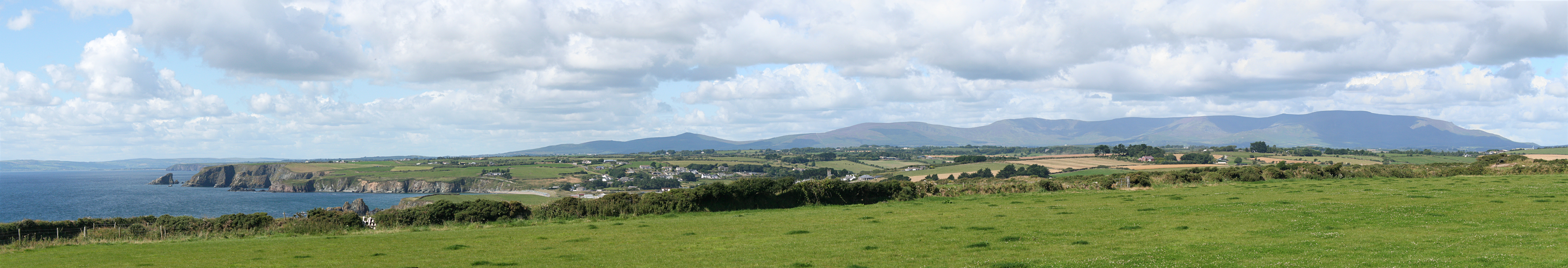
Copper Coast and Commaragh Mountains

== Features ==
This geologically diverse area contains records of Palaeozoic volcanism and the last ice age - a heritage which is interpreted locally for the visitor. The geopark trust maintains a visitor centre at Monksland Church in Knockmahon. It also owns an old engine house, part of the industrial heritage.

== Organisation ==
The geopark is overseen by a charitable company, with voluntary local and expert directors, and a staff of a part-time manager and a geologist, supported by volunteer guides, and community employment workers from Solas and Tus.
