= List of UNESCO Global Geoparks in North America =

In North America, (Note: Mexico is member of the Latin American and the Caribbean Geoparks Network, therefore treated there. Greenland, although a territory of Denmark is treated under North America.) there is no regional geopark network so far. As of July 2020, there are five UNESCO Global Geoparks in Canada and several aspiring geoparks projects going on, under the framework of the Canadian Geoparks Network. In the United States, there are no active UNESCO Global Geoparks so far, but there are certain plans to establish geoparks, applying for this label. Further elements of the geodiversity of the continent is represented on the World Heritage list, under criterion VIII or VII.

== UNESCO Global Geoparks ==
UNESCO Global Geopark	Image	Location	Area (km^{2})	Year	Geodiversity
Cliffs of Fundy		Nova Scotia; Canada; 45°41′44″N 64°27′05″W		2020	It includes exposures of the Central Atlantic Magmatic province.
Discovery Geopark		Newfoundland & Labrador; Canada; 48°33′08″N 53°08′18″W		2020	A coastal Geopark within the Appalachian orogen. Includes important fossils of Ediacaran biota
Percé		Quebec; Canada; 48°31′18″N 64°13′02″W	555	2018	The geopark is located in the Appalachian Mountains, with rocks and fossils documenting a 500 million years evolution, from Paleozoic orogenies to magmatic and tectonic events of the divergence of North America from Eurasia and Quaternary glaciation. It is also an important location from the viewpoint of the history of geology, as the starting point of the geological mapping of Canada by William Edmond Logan.
Stonehammer		New Brunswick; Canada; 45°34′46″N 65°32′40″W	2500	2010	The range of outcrops, fossils and landforms from the Precambrian to Quaternary was an important location for the pioneer years of Canadian geology. The complex geology of collision and divergence of continents, and glaciation was interpreted by Abraham Pineo Gesner, the first provincial geologist of the British Empire or the name-bearing Steinhammer Club a group of young men with the aim of exploring the local geology.
Tumbler Ridge		British Columbia; Canada; 54°59′24″N 121°22′48″W	7822	2014	Tumbler Ridge is a globally important paleontological site with Cretaceous dinosaur tracks and bones, Triassic fish and reptiles. The sedimentation record from the Precambrian to the Cretaceous were deformed into mountain chain during the Laramide Orogeny, carved into a rugged terrain by a series of glaciations in the Quaternary.

== Aspiring geoparks ==
Geoparks in North America:
UNESCO Global Geopark
Aspiring geopark project
1: Stonehammer, 2: Cliffs of Fundy, 3: Saguenay, 4: Charlevoix 5: Ohnia:kara, 6: Big Impact Sudbury, 7: Keweenaw,

According to the register of Canadian Geoparks Network, the following geopark projects are going on with the future request for UNESCO status. There are further plans to establish geoparks in the United States as well.

Name	Location
Cabox	Newfoundland & Labrador; Canada; 48°50′00″N 58°29′03″W
Saguenay	Quebec; Canada; 48°25′42″N 71°04′21″W
Charlevoix	Quebec; Canada; 47°36′51″N 70°10′10″W
Temiskaming Rift Valley	Quebec / Ontario; Canada; 47°32′02″N 79°32′09″W
Ohnia:kara	Ontario; Canada; 43°03′29″N 79°17′25″W
Big Impact Sudbury	Ontario; Canada; 46°26′11″N 81°02′30″W
Saanich Inlet	British Columbia; Canada; 48°38′54″N 123°30′14″W
Appalachian	West Virginia; United States; 39°38′46″N 79°58′02″W
Gold Belt	Colorado; United States; 38°47′14″N 105°27′36″W
Keweenaw	Michigan; United States; 47°15′02″N 88°19′51″W

== The Canadian Geoparks Network ==
The Canadian National Committee for Geoparks (CNCG) or the Canadian Geoparks Network was founded in 2009, under the patronage of the Canadian Federation of Earth Sciences (CFES). As the national committee of Canada of the Global Geoparks Network, it is the coordinator of UNESCO Global Geopark applications from Canada and a forum for capacity building among active UNESCO-labeled geoparks and aspiring ones. The committee is helping the currently running and future geopark applications with established guidelines, site visits prior to applications for SWOT analysis.

North America is currently not represented with a regional geopark network in the Global Geoparks Network, such as the Asia Pacific Geoparks Network. With the lack of active UNESCO Global Geoparks in the United States, the Canadian Geoparks Network represent the North American geoparks movement in international conferences and regional meetings.

== Recognition of North America's geodiversity under different international frameworks ==
=== World Heritage sites ===
Sixteen sites are represented currently on the World Heritage list under criterion VIII, as an outstanding representative of Earth's history:

- Anticosti (Canada)
- Great Smoky Mountains National Park (United States)
- Carlsbad Caverns National Park (United States)
- Mammoth Cave National Park (United States)
- Everglades National Park (United States)
- Grand Canyon National Park (United States)
- Yellowstone National Park (United States)
- Yosemite National Park (United States)
- Joggins Fossil Cliffs (Canada)
- Miguasha National [provincial] Park (Canada)
- Mistaken Point (Canada)
- Kluane / Wrangell-St Elias / Glacier Bay / Tatshenshini-Alsek (Canada)
- Canadian Rocky Mountain Parks (Canada)
- Dinosaur Provincial Park (Canada)
- Gros Morne National Park (Canada)
- Nahanni National Park Reserve (Canada)
- Ilulissat Icefjord (Greenland, Denmark)

Further sites are inscribed under criterion VII of superlative natural phenomena and aesthetic importance. Some of them, which have a special geoheritage importance are:

- Olympic National Park (United States)
- Waterton Glacier International Peace Park (Canada, United States)
