= Geotourism =

Tourism associated with geological attractions and destinations

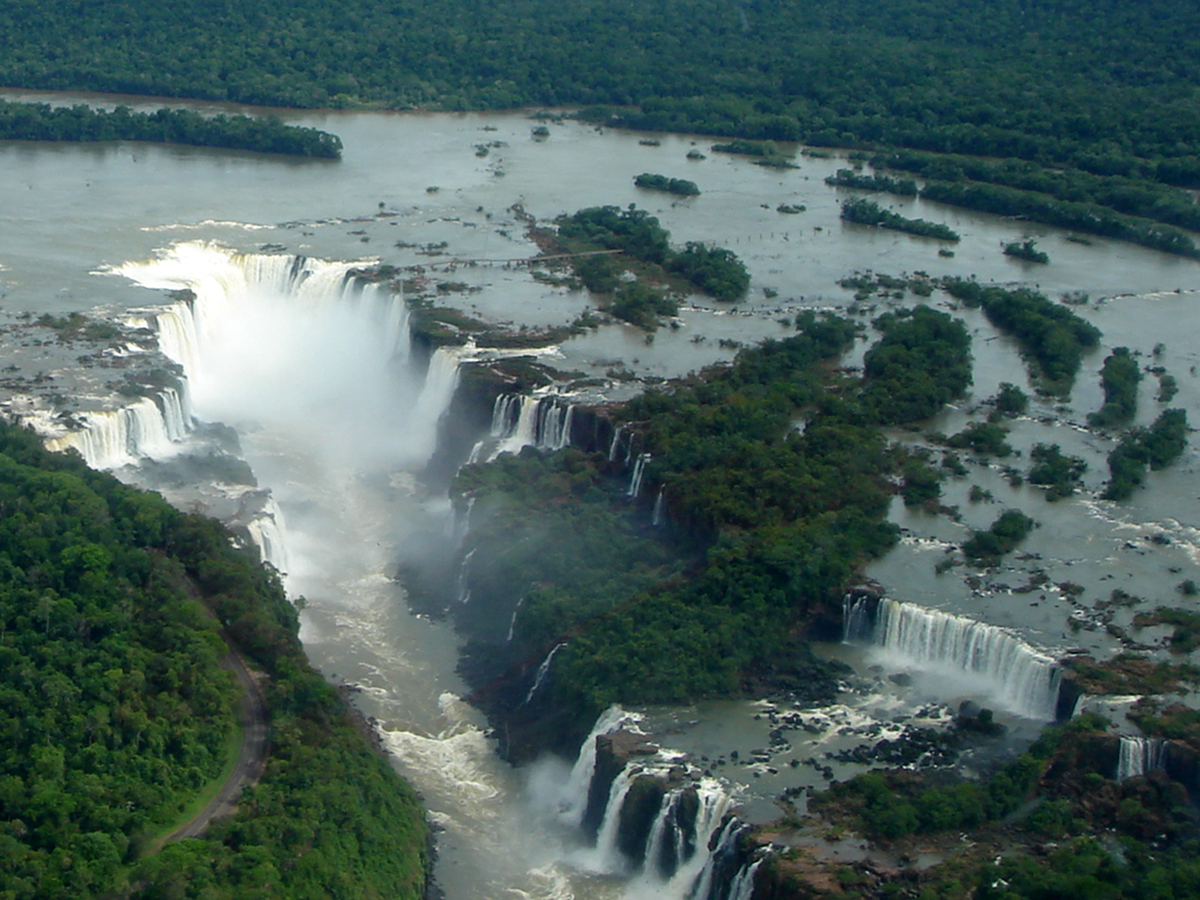
Geological sustainable tourism aims to conserve and promote a place as a geosite, such as the Iguazu Falls in South America

Geotourism is tourism associated with geological attractions and destinations. Geotourism (tourism with a geological base) deals with the abiotic natural and built environments. Geotourism was first defined in England by Thomas Alfred Hose in 1995.

== Definitions of modern geotourism ==
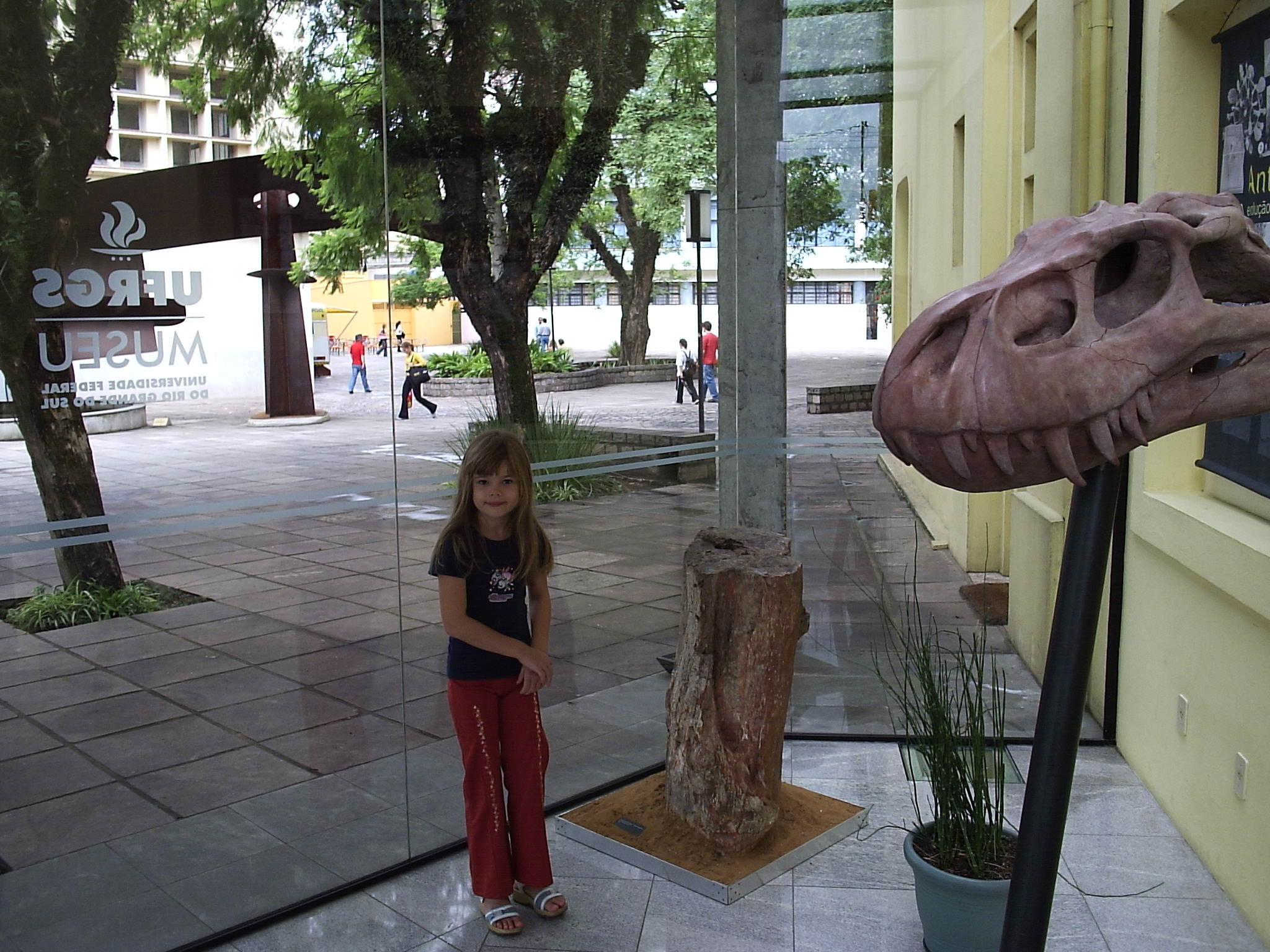
Geopark of Paleorrota, in Brazil

Most of the world defines geotourism as purely the study of geological and geomorphological features. The key definitions of modern geotourism (abiotic nature-based tourism) include:

1. "...part of the tourist's activity in which they have the geological patrimony as their main attraction. Their objective is to search for protected patrimony through the conservation of their resources and of the tourist's Environmental Awareness. For that, the use of the interpretation of the patrimony makes it accessible to the lay public, promoting its popularization and the development of the Earth sciences".
2. "Geotourism is a knowledge-based tourism, an interdisciplinary integration of the tourism industry with conservation and interpretation of abiotic nature attributes, besides considering related cultural issues, within the geosites for the general public".
3. "A form of natural area tourism that specifically focuses on landscape and geology. It promotes tourism to geosites and the conservation of geo-diversity and an understanding of Earth sciences through appreciation and learning. This is achieved through independent visits to geological features, use of geo-trails and viewpoints, guided tours, geo-activities and patronage of geosite visitor centers".
4. "The provision of interpretative and service facilities for geosites and geomorphosites and their encompassing topography, together with their associated in-situ and ex-situ artefacts, to constituency-build for their conservation by generating appreciation, learning and research by and for current and future generations".

== Geotourism (abiotic nature-based tourism), a new approach ==
According to Sadry (2009), in the past, nature-based tourism activities largely focused on living things (namely biotic nature attractions/biodiversity phenomena).As a result, visiting natural areas and their unique flora and fauna, gradually led to the development of ecotourism, wildlife tourism, and other similar tourism types. Recently, in the 21st century, geotourism has emerged to deal with non-living parts of the natural environment. Geological features and landforms are examples of abiotic nature or geodiversity phenomena.

Geotourism adds to ecotourism's principal focus on plants (flora) and animals (fauna) by adding a third dimension to the abiotic environment. Thus it is growing around the world through the growth of geoparks as well as independently in many natural and urban areas where tourism focus in on the geological environment.

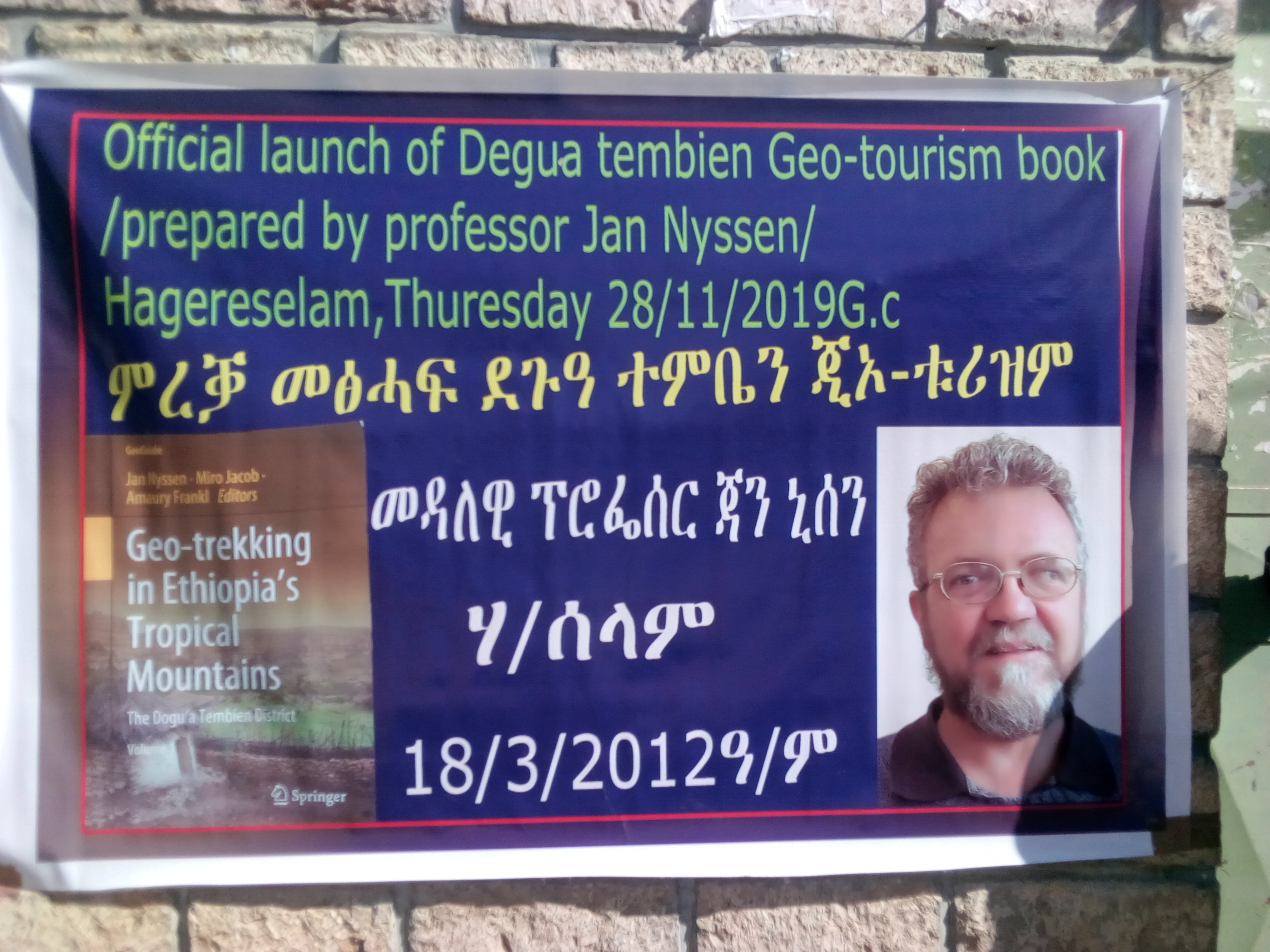
Official launch of the Dogu'a Tembien geo-trekking guide

"Looking at the environment in a simplistic manner, we see that it is made up of Abiotic, Biotic and Cultural (ABC) attributes. Starting with the 'C' or cultural component first, we note that of three features it is this one which is generally the most known and interpreted, that is, through information about the built or cultural environment either in the past (historical accounts) or present (community customs and culture). The 'B' or biotic features of fauna (animals) and flora (plants) has seen a large focus of interpretation and understanding through ecotourism. But it is the first attribute of the 'A' or abiotic features including rocks, landforms and processes that has received the least attention in tourism, and consequently is the least known and understood. This holistic approach to tourism is growing rapidly around the world and It is powering UNESCO Global Geoparks which are now on virtually every continent This then is the real power of geotourism, in that it puts the tourist spotlight firmly on geology, and brings it to the forefront of our understanding through tourism".

== Comparison with ecotourism ==
Geotourism is often confused with ecotourism, due to close definitions of the terms. Geotourism is geodiversity-centred while ecotourism is biodiversity-centred. Geotourism activities focus on providing the recreation geology contexts for visitors. Three core elements within the concept of geotourism have been recognised that distinguish this concept from ecotourism, namely: 1. Abiotic nature as the main attraction;2. Geological heritage interpretation; and 3. Positive outcomes for nature and local residents Geotourism is a sister category to ecotourism. Geotourism is distinguished to be focused on abiotic nature and built environments dealing with geology and geomorphology while ecotourism is focused on the living nature dealing with ecology and living things.

== Sectors ==
Geotourism encompasses a wide range of sectors, reflecting the diversity of geological and geomorphological features that attract visitors worldwide. These sectors vary from urban and rural settings to specialised niches such as volcanic, celestial, and space geotourism. The following list outlines the main sectors currently recognised in the field.Geotourism sectors include:

- Urban
- Rural
- Roadcuts
- Dinosaurs
- Meteorites
- Aerial
- Volcanoes
- Wellness
- Mining
- Celestial
- Space
- Adventure
- Accessible
- Underground

== Geotourism Marketing ==
Geotourism stakeholders are the local people, geo-visitors, travel agencies, business owners, etc., just like the tourism stakeholders. Schools and universities could also be considered as stakeholders in geotourism when discussing geopark development. Marketing strategies practiced in UNESCO Global Geoparks include professional internal and external marketing tools such as brochures, magazines, newsletters, websites, social media platforms; as well as public relation activities, such as participating trade shows; advertising campaigns and even joint marketing through networking on regional, national, and international level. Since geotourism emphasizes the abiotic nature, environmental protection, and the local community, it is important that destinations, such as geoparks, focus their marketing efforts for geotourism in a sustainable manner; so that, the environment including the geoheritages and the local community would benefit most.

== Geosites ==
A geosite is a location that has a particular geological or geomorphological significance. As well as its inherent geological characteristics it may also have cultural or heritage significance. Geosites, geological or geomorphological sites with a recognised value determined through an audit, assessment, and selection process, are subject to a range of threats (Prosser et al., 2018).

== The Example of Geotourism ==
All UNESCO Global Geoparks and national geoparks around the world and all geotourism sites such as historical mines, caves, and... are manifestations of the geotourism industry.

== Geodiversity ==
Geodiversity is the variety of earth materials, forms, and processes that constitute and shape the Earth, either the whole or a specific part of it. The term geodiversity is strongly linked to other neologisms such as geoconservation, geoheritage or even geo-indicators. All these terms promote the idea that human activities threaten the diversity of rocks, soils, and landforms as well as the dynamics of the processes that generate them.

== Geotrails ==
According to the Geological Society of Australia, a geotrail "delivers geotourism experiences through a journey linked by an area's geology and landscape as the basis for providing visitor engagement, learning and enjoyment". Geotrail definition is ‘A guided or self-guided trail of multiple geosites that interprets geology and landscape’.

== Geoparks ==
A geopark is a unified area that advances the protection and use of geological heritage in a sustainable way, and promotes the economic well-being of the people who live there. Geotourism has been developed from an unknown niche trend to an approach in the tourism industry since 2004, due to the UNESCO support for the global geopark movement in the 21st century. The potential activities within geoparks ranging from visiting cultural heritage to natural attractions, agriculture, and even dark tourism.

== Geoconservation ==
Geoconservation is the practice of recognising, protecting and managing sites and landscapes which have value for their geology or geomorphology. Geoconservation is carried out by a wide range of organisations from local geological societies to government agencies. Typically the conservation of geodiversity at a site or within a landscape takes place alongside that of biodiversity.

== Sustainable Practices and Community Impact in Geotourism ==
Geotourism emphasizes the conservation and appreciation of a region's geological features while typically fostering sustainable tourism practices. One notable aspect of geotourism is its integration with eco-tourism principles, often promoting both the preservation of unique geological formations but also the education and engagement of visitors. For example, UNESCO Global Geoparks play a vital role in geotourism by serving as hubs for scientific research, local cultural preservation, and community-led development. These parks highlight geological heritage through interpretive centers, guided tours, and interactive exhibits that connect visitors to the Earth's history.

Additionally, geotourism contributes to the socio-economic well-being of local communities. By creating opportunities for small-scale enterprises, such as eco-lodges, craft markets, and guided trekking experiences, geotourism empowers residents to sustain their livelihoods while protecting natural resources . This tourism model also addresses environmental challenges by often encouraging low-impact practices like renewable energy use and waste reduction in tourist operations, ensuring the long-term viability of geosites for future generations .

== See also ==
- Geoheritage
- Geology of the Canary Islands#Geotourism
- Global Geoparks Network
