= Aras Geopark =

- Aras UNESCO Global Geopark
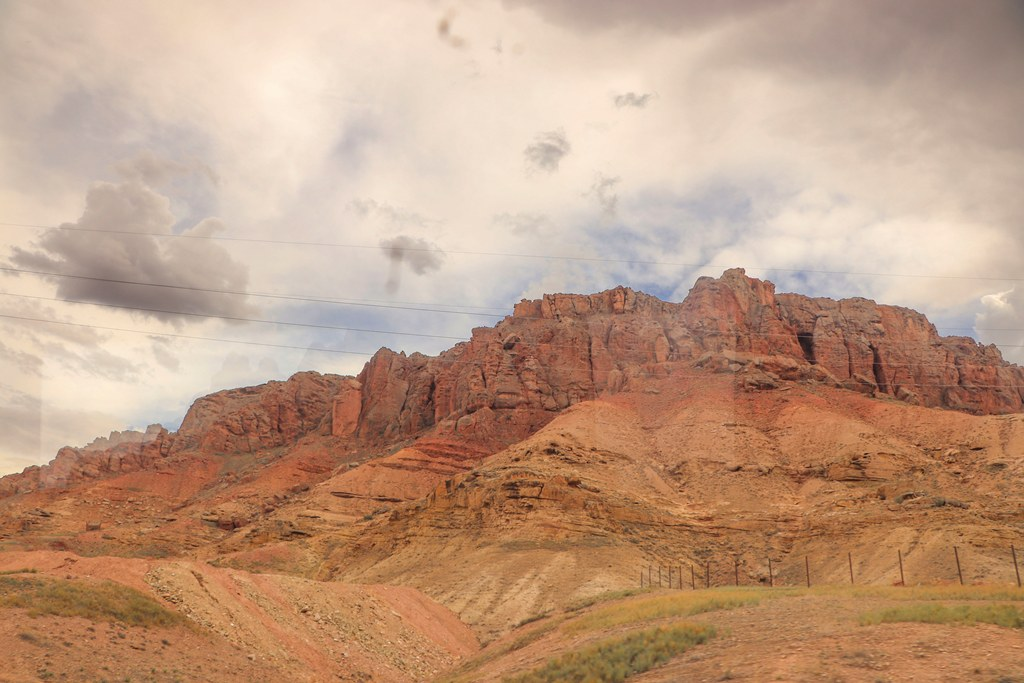
- Aras Geopark, badlands

- Location within Iran
- Location: Jolfa County, East Azerbaijan province, Iran
- Nearest city: Jolfa, Iran
- Coordinates: 38.98°N 45.47°E
- Website: Official website

The Aras Geopark is a UNESCO Global Geopark in the northwest of Iran. Awarded UNESCO geopark status in 2023, it covers an area of 1,670 square kilometres (640 sq mi). Geopark status was granted on the grounds that it traces of the Permian–Triassic extinction event that occurred 252 million years ago.

The mountainous nature of the Geopark features many notable geological structures, such as badlands, sandstone, granitic and volcanic rocks, as well as a rich wildlife variety. The park is home to several remarkable cultural treasures.

== Geography ==
The Geopark is located in the north of East Azarbaijan province covering the entire Jolfa County territory. The Aras River forms its northern boundary.

== Geology ==
Within the Geopark, four lithological areas can be identified. The western highlands consist of Late Paleozoic and Early Mesozoic carbonate rocks. In the central areas, there are Cretaceous and Eocene sandstone, shale, and marl beds. Towards the east, intrusive igneous rocks are dominating. In the southern parts dacitic volcanic rocks are prevailing.

== Cultural features ==
Aras Geopark is home to several remarkable cultural treasures including Saint Stepanos Monastery, Kordasht Hammam, Chapel of Chupan and Khajeh Nazar Caravanserai.

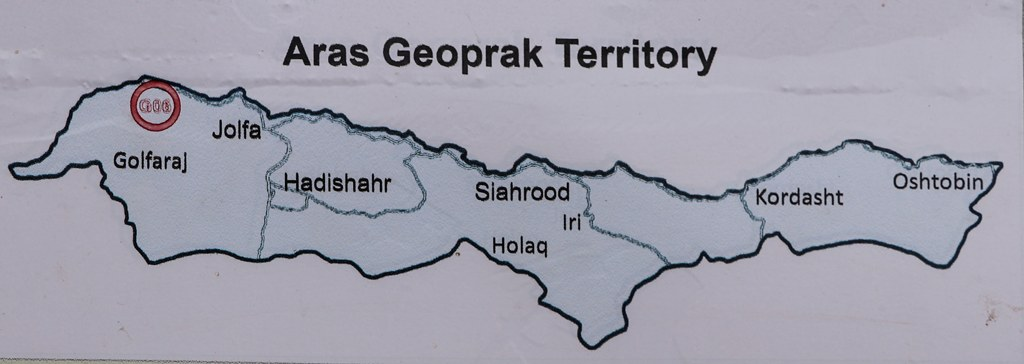
Map of Aras Geopark

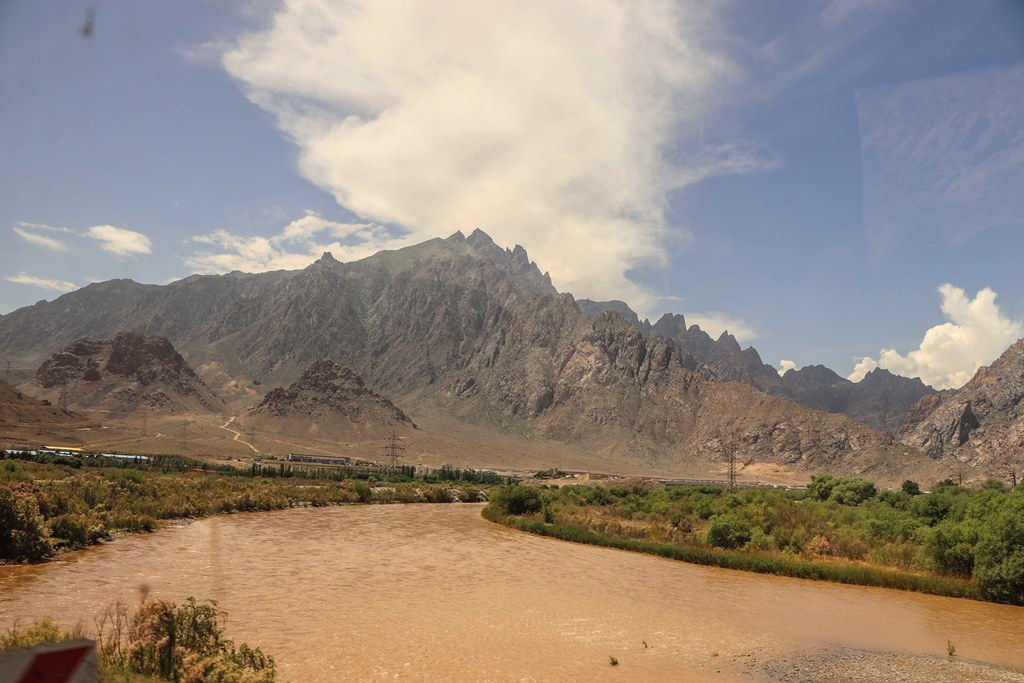
Aras river valley

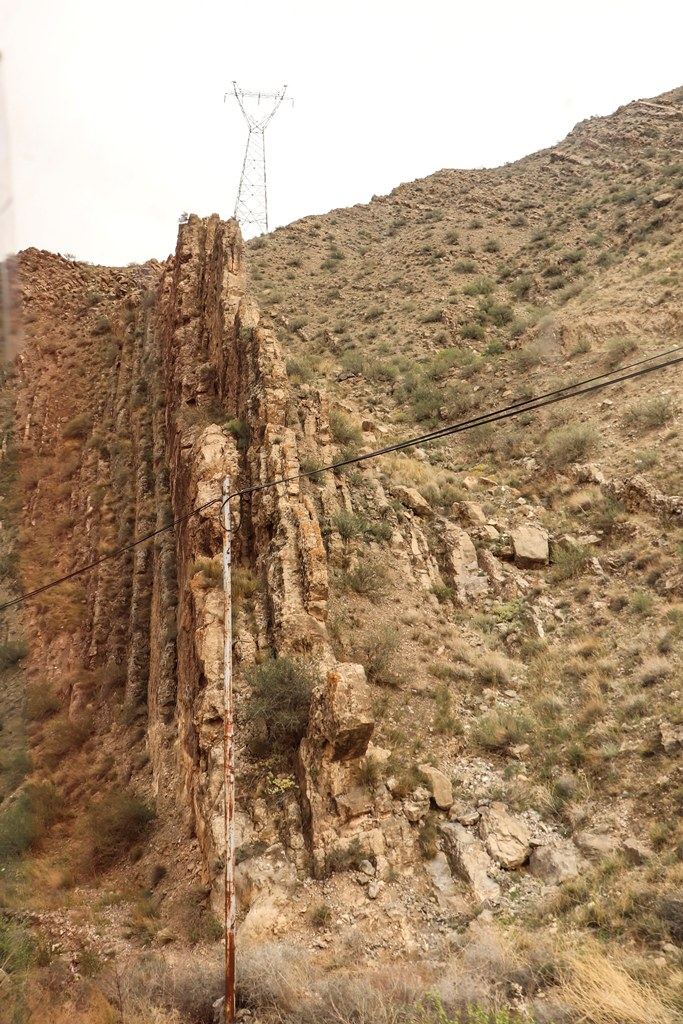
Sandstone cliffs.jpg
