= List of UNESCO Global Geoparks in Africa =

UNESCO Global Geoparks in Africa

UNESCO has currently designated two UNESCO Global Geoparks in Africa, (Note: Africa is considered as the continent itself, including Northern African states that are defined under the Arabic States category in the UNESCO World Heritage Convent. Independent archipelagos are included (e.g. Seychelles), but island groups under European sovereignty (e.g. the Canary Islands) are excluded, as geoparks here are not part of the African Geoparks Network.) located in two state parties, Tanzania and Morocco. There are plans for national geoparks in an initial phase that could be further developed to gain the UNESCO recognition. Also on an international level, several sites of geoheritage values are inscribed on the World Heritage list under criterion VIII and/or criterion VII.

Africa has a globally significant geodiversity that represents geological-geomorphological processes from the Archean to the Quaternary. However, the acknowledgement of the continent's geodiversity is still lagging behind the recognition of its biodiversity, many areas of global importance are not represented under international agreements, and national legislative acts on the protection of geoheritage are limited.

== UNESCO Global Geoparks ==
UNESCO Global Geopark	Image	Location	Area (km^{2})	Year	Geodiversity
M'Goun		Drâa-Tafilalet Region; Morocco; 31°30′00″N 6°27′00″W	5730	2014	Central High Atlas. Geological evolution mainly in the Triassic to Jurassic periods. Key geosites: tectonic structures and sedimentary sequences, such as Synclinale d'Iouaridène, Zaouit Ahança or Ait Abdi, and important paleontological sites such as Ait Blal or Ibaqualliwn.
Ngorongoro-Lengai		Arusha Region, Tanzania; 1°40′43″S 36°36′34″E	11886	2018	East African Rift Valley. Primary geoheritage values: intracontinental rifting. Ol Doinyo Lengai is globally unique with its natro-carbonatite lavas, Ngorongoro caldera gives a habitat for wildlife species. Other: Olduvai Gorge or Laetoli, both of global paleontological relevance.

== The African Geoparks Network ==
The African Geoparks Network (AGN) was founded in 2009 in Abidjan by the African Association of Women in Geosciences (AAWG) during the 5th Conference of Women and Geosciences for Peace. The scope of the organization is not limited to Africa sensum stricto, but the Middle East is also associated with it. With its mission to improve the situation of geoheritage in the region, the main objectives are the following:

- Identifying Geosites;
- Making an inventory of geosites of outstanding value in Africa and the Middle East;
- Creating and maintaining dynamic GIS data bases;
- Promoting and increasing the awareness amongst policy makers and the general public in Africa and the Middle East, in particular local communities, about the necessity for the protection of and benefits incurred in the use of geological heritage through the creation of geoparks for local socio-economic sustainable development;
- Building the capacity of the local population in the field of geoheritage and geoconservation through a strong network including the organization of conferences, seminars, symposia, training courses and workshops focussing on the non-professional community.

=== Activities ===
AGN, together with AAWG is the organizer of the International conference on Geoparks in Africa and the Middle East (ICGAME). Events of this conference series are the following:

Name	Date	Venue	Title
1st ICGAME	20–28 November 2011	El Jadida (Morocco)	Aspiring Geoparks in Africa and Arab World
2nd ICGAME	1–4 October 2014	Dakar (Senegal)	Geoheritage in the service of local sustainable development
3rd ICGAME	20–24 March 2018	El Jadida (Morocco)	Geoheritage and Geoconservation: concepts, advancements and challenges
4th ICGAME	1–5 April 2020	Beirut (Lebanon)	Geoheritage, gateway to sustainable development and peace building

Besides the ICGAME, AGN is organizing in collaboration with local, national and international stakeholders other workshops and scientific sessions, such as the Day for Earth Sciences in Africa and the Middle East in 2013.

=== African UNESCO Global Geopark Network ===
In 2019 November, it was announced that the African UNESCO Global Geopark Network is founded, as the 4th regional geopark network of Global Geoparks Network (GGN). Its primary aim is to function as a platform to support the promotion of the UNESCO Global Geopark concept and the capacity building of the numerous geopark initiatives and projects on the continent. The official launch of the organization is expected with the 1st African UNESCO Global Geoparks International Conference in Arusha, Tanzania in May 2020.

== Recognition of Africa's geodiversity under different international frameworks ==
=== World Heritage sites ===
Ten sites are represented currently on the World Heritage list under criterion VIII, as an outstanding representative of Earth's history:

- Virunga National Park (Democratic Republic of the Congo),
- Lake Turkana National Parks (Kenya),
- Namib Sand Sea (Namibia),
- Vallée de Mai Nature Reserve (Seychelles),
- Vredefort Dome (South Africa),
- Barberton Makhonjwa Mountains (South Africa),
- Ngorongoro Conservation Area (Tanzania),
- Mosi-oa-Tunya / Victoria Falls (Zambia and Zimbabwe)
- Tassili n'Ajjer (Algeria)
- Wadi Al-Hitan (Egypt)

Further sites are inscribed under criterion VII of superlative natural phenomena and aesthetic importance. Some of them, which have a special geoheritage importance are:

- Simien National Park (Ethiopia),
- Mount Kenya National Park/Natural Forest (Kenya),
- Kenya Lake System in the Great Rift Valley (Kenya),
- Maloti-Drakensberg Park (Lesotho and South Africa),
- Tsingy de Bemaraha Strict Nature Reserve (Madagascar),
- Lake Malawi National Park (Malawi),
- Cliff of Bandiagara (Mali),
- Rwenzori Mountains National Park (Uganda),
- Kilimanjaro National Park (Tanzania)
