= European Geoparks Network =

Geological heritage organization

The European Geoparks Network (EGN) functions as the regional organization of the Global Geoparks Network (GGN) and the UNESCO International Geosciences and Geoparks Programme (UNESCO-IGGP). Its main objective is to ensure cooperation between geoparks for the protection of geological heritage and the promotion of sustainable development of their territories in Europe. In 2020 January, the EGN had 75 institutional members (UNESCO Global Geoparks) from 26 European countries and there are several aspiring geopark projects, applying for a UNESCO label and therefore the permanent EGN membership.

== History ==
The 1990s are widely considered as the birth of geoheritage as a dedicated domain of the geosciences, dealing with the preservation and valorisation of the Earth's abiotical heritage, its geodiversity. The idea of coordinated work on geology-focused territorial frameworks in Europe was discussed during the International Geological Congress in Beijing, 1997. After preparatory meetings in 1999, four European territories assembled in Lesvos, between 3–5 June 2000:

- Réserve Géologique de Haute-Provence – France
- Natural History Museum of Lesvos Petrified Forest – Greece (Lesvos)
- Geopark Gerolstein/Vulkaneifel – Germany
- Maestrazgo Cultural Park – Spain

They signed the convention on the establishment of the European Geoparks Label and the Network itself, with the intention of sharing information and expertise, as well as defining common tools.

On 20 April 2001, during the 3rd EGN Coordination Meeting, the Convention of Cooperation was signed between UNESCO Division of Earth Sciences and the EGN at Parc Cabo de Gata in Spain, defining the basis of the partnership between the two signatories.

In February 2004 the Global Geoparks Network (GGN) was founded in Paris by the members of EGN and the Chinese Geopark Network. The international partnership was developed under the umbrella of UNESCO and in October 2004 the Madonie Declaration was issued during the 5th Annual Meeting of EGN. It recognized the EGN as the official branch of the UNESCO – Global Geoparks Network in Europe. The declaration also underlines that EGN serves as a reference for the creation of similar continental networks of geoparks worldwide.

From March 2015 (35th European Geoparks Meeting, Paris, France), EGN continued as the regional geopark network of GGN. In November 2015, the 38th UNESCO General Conference adopted the International Geosciences and Geoparks Programme, officially approving the geopark concept to its framework and merging it with the existing International Geoscience Programme. The UNESCO Global Geopark label was created and all institutional members of EGN received it automatically.

== Organization ==
The EGN operates under the auspices of the Statutes of the Global Geoparks Network, supplemented with the Rules of Operation of EGN, based on the Charter of EGN, signed in 2000. Its headquarters are located in the Haute-Provence UNESCO Global Geopark in Digne-les-Bains, France.

The members of EGN consist of:

- the institutional members: all the UNESCO Global Geoparks and regional members of GGN in Europe.
- individual members: professionals of GGN in Europe, dealing with geopark management
- honorary members: people who have committed extraordinary service to the geopark concept
- cooperating members: international organizations, institutions or people providing financial or other assistance to the EGN

== National geoparks committees / forums ==
In several European countries, national geopark networks were founded after the decision of the Coordination Committee of EGN in 2007. They function as the forums to enhance the cooperation of geoparks and the promotion of the geopark concept on a national level and taking over directly selected activities of EGN / GGN in a country.

As of 2020, the following national committees / forums exist.

- Austrian Geoparks Forum
- Czech Geoparks Forum
- French Geoparks Forum
- Finnish Geoparks Forum
- German Geoparks Forum
- Hellenic Geoparks Forum
- Icelandic Geoparks Forum
- Irish Geoparks Forum
- Italian Geoparks Forum
- Netherlands Geopark Forum
- Norwegian National Committee for Geoheritage and Geoparks
- Portuguese Geoparks Forum
- Slovenian Geopark Forum
- Spanish Geoparks Forum
- UK Geoparks Forum

== Members ==
European Geoparks Network
Situated outside the map: Azores, El Hierro, Lanzarote and Chinijo Islands

=== Former members ===
(at 18 April 2018):

- Abberley and Malvern Hills Geopark (England, UK)
- Astrobleme, Rochechouart (France)
- Kamptal Geopark (Austria)
- Lochaber Geopark (Scotland, UK)
- Mecklenburg Ice-age Landscape Geopark (Germany)

== Meetings and activities ==
The executive decisions and operative work of EGN take place within the half-year coordination meetings, hosted every spring and autumn by one of the institutional members. The six-monthly coordination meetings of the autumn periods run parallel with the Annual Meetings (2000–2012) and European Geoparks Conferences, now organized every two years. These are open to non-institutional and non-individual EGN members as well, functioning as venues of scientific exchange and networking opportunity, related to the geoparks concept.

List of European Geoparks Conferences / Annual Meetings of EGN
Conference	Venue	Date
1st European Geoparks Annual Meeting	Molinos – Teruel (Spain)	October 2000
2nd European Geoparks Annual Meeting	Petrified Forest Lesvos Island (Greece)	October 2001
3rd European Geoparks Annual Meeting	Kamptal Geopark (Austria)	October 2002
4th European Geoparks Annual Meeting	Psiloritis Natural Park (Crete, Greece)	October 2003
5th European Geoparks Annual Meeting	Madonie Natural Park (Sicily, Italy)	October 2004
6th European Geoparks Annual Meeting	Petrified Forest Lesvos Island (Greece)	October 2005
7th European Geoparks Annual Meeting	Northwest Highlands Geopark (Scotland, United Kingdom)	September 2007
8th European Geoparks Conference	Naturtejo Geopark (Portugal)	September 2009
9th European Geoparks Conference	Lesvos Petrified Forest Geopark (Greece)	September 2010
10th European Geoparks Conference	Gea Norvegica Geopark (Norway)	September 2011
11th European Geoparks Conference	Arouca Geopark (Portugal)	September 2012
12th European Geoparks Conference	Cilento e Vallo di Diano Geopark (Italy)	September 2013
13th European Geoparks Conference	Rokua Geopark (Finland)	September 2015
14th European Geoparks Conference	Azores Geopark (Azores, Portugal)	September 2017
15th European Geoparks Conference	Sierra Norte de Sevilla Geopark (Spain)	September 2019

== See also ==
- Geopark
- Geotourism
- Global Geoparks Network
- Asia Pacific Geoparks Network
- Latin America and the Caribbean Geoparks Network
- African Geoparks Network
