= Paleontological heritage =

Component of geoheritage

Paleontological heritage (often shortened to paleoheritage) is the component of geoheritage constituted by fossils together with their enclosing geological context, occurring both in situ, at fossiliferous sites, and ex situ, once displaced from their place of origin (for example, to become part of institutional collections), to which heritage value is assigned (scientific, educational, cultural, or other) on account of the information it provides about the history of life. It is a heritage category comparable to other forms of natural heritage, such as biodiversity.

The first reference to paleontological heritage as such was in the 1996 book Environmental Geomorphology, which based the scientific heritage value of sites on their rarity, critical position in an ecosystem, scenic appeal, and paleontological significance. Subsequent development of the concept was advanced by Vincent L. Santucci of the National Park Service, and by researchers working at the intersection of geoconservation and paleontology.

Effective geoconservation of Earth's paleontological heritage necessitates expanding the concept of geological heritage to include ex situ geological objects, such as fossil collections, as legitimate targets of conservation concern and action. The established principles of geoconservation can be applied to paleontological heritage through systematic inventory and evaluation procedures, which are foundational to subsequent conservation, promotion, and monitoring efforts, including the curation of fossil specimens.

Not all fossils carry equal value; assessments differ considerably depending on whether they are made on scientific grounds or commercial ones, with the latter prioritizing aesthetic appeal and rarity over research significance. While collectors tend to place a premium on exceptionally well-preserved specimens, paleontologists view preservation quality as just one of several factors contributing to a fossil's significance. A holotype or a specimen marking the first recorded occurrence of a taxon within a given basin typically holds far greater scientific importance than a visually striking find, regardless of the latter's aesthetic qualities.

== Examples of paleontological heritage sites ==
=== Australia ===
Australia's significant fossil sites include World Heritage Sites such as the Riversleigh World Heritage Area (Queensland) for Oligocene–Miocene mammals and Naracoorte Caves National Park (South Australia) for Pleistocene megafauna. Other notable sites include Nilpena Ediacara National Park (South Australia) for early life, Winton (Queensland) for Cretaceous dinosaurs, and Canowindra (New South Wales) for Devonian fish.

=== Canada ===
Canada's significant fossil sites include the Burgess Shale in Yoho National Park and Kootenay National Park in British Columbia, known for exceptional 508-million-year-old Cambrian marine fossils.

=== China ===
China is among the world's most significant countries for paleontological heritage, with a fossil record that has reshaped scientific understanding of early animal life and the evolution of birds. The Chengjiang Fossil Site in Yunnan province, designated a UNESCO World Heritage Site in 2012, preserves an exceptional Early Cambrian marine community dating to approximately 518 million years ago. The site documents over 20 phyla and more than 300 species, including some of the earliest known chordates, and is China's first and Asia's only fossil-related World Heritage Site.

In northeastern China, the Yixian Formation of Liaoning province, part of the broader Jehol Biota, has yielded thousands of exceptionally preserved Early Cretaceous fossils including feathered dinosaurs, early birds, mammals, insects, and flowering plants. Discoveries from this formation since the 1990s have been central to establishing the evolutionary link between theropod dinosaurs and modern birds.

=== United States ===
In the United States there are paleontological heritage sites with natural features, such as the La Brea Tar Pits in California and Dinosaur National Monument in Colorado; cultural features, such as Chaco Culture National Historical Park, where petrified wood and fossils were used by ancient civilizations; and scenically significant sites such as Badlands National Park in South Dakota, Florissant Fossil Beds National Monument in Colorado, and John Day Fossil Beds National Monument in Oregon.

== See also ==
- Conservation paleobiology
- Geoheritage
- Geoconservation
- Paleontology
- List of fossil sites
