= List of UNESCO Global Geoparks in Latin America =

Latin America (Note: Latin America is considered here as the Latin America and the Caribbean region of the World Heritage Convention. Geoparks are currently not included in the Latin American Geoparks Network.) is represented under the Global Geoparks Network by the geoparks of the Latin American Geoparks Network (Red GEOLAC). As of 2024, it includes 12 UNESCO Global Geoparks and further projects are in progress seeking UNESCO status or that of national geopark in South America, Central America and the Caribbean.

== UNESCO Global Geoparks ==
UNESCO Global Geopark	Image	Location	Area (km^{2})	Year	Geodiversity
Araripe		Ceará, Brazil; 7°13′46″S 39°24′32″W	3441	2006	Situated in the Araripe Basin, its globally outstanding geoheritage is connected to the palaeontological records of the Lower Cretaceous. Geosites like Parque do Pterossauros or Floresta Petrificada do Cariri preserved and illustrates this geological environment with remnants of reptiles like pterosaurus to silicified trunks and fossilized flowering plants.
Seridó		Rio Grande do Norte, Brazil	2802	2022	Located in Brazil's semi-arid northeast, it houses over 120,000 residents, including the Quilombolas, who honor their African ancestors through cultural preservation. The geopark encapsulates 600 million years of Earth's history, boasting South America's significant scheelite mineralizations and basalt flows from the Mesozoic and Cenozoic Eras. This geodiversity shapes the region's unique Caatinga biome, characterized by subtropical flora exclusive to Brazil.
Caminhos dos Cânions do Sul		Rio Grande do Sul, and Santa Catarina, Brazil	2830	2022	It is characterized by Atlantic Forests, one of the planet's richest ecosystems in terms of biodiversity. The area's pre-Columbian inhabitants used to shelter in paleoburrows (underground cavities excavated by extinct paleo-vertebrate megafauna like the giant ground sloth) whose numerous vestiges are still visible in the geopark. The site moreover features the most impressive canyons in South America, formed by the unique geomorphological processes that the continent underwent during the breakup of the Gondwana supercontinent some 180 million years ago.
Quarta Colônia		Rio Grande do Sul, Brazil	2923	2023	Overlapping with the Mata Atlântica Biosphere Reserve, this territory harbors a distinctive international paleontological heritage, boasting significant fossil evidence. The sedimentary rocks underlying the landscape, deposited between 233 and 225 million years ago during the Triassic Period, contain remarkably well-preserved records of a pivotal moment in Earth's history. Exclusive species such as Buriolestes schultzi, Bagualosaurus acuteensis, and Macrocollum itaquii, previously found only in Quarta Colônia, further enhance its scientific significance.
Caçapava do Sul		Rio Grande do Sul, Brazil	3047	2023	The volcano-sedimentary deposits of the "Camaqu basin," which date from the Ediacaran to the Cambrian and give a full and well-exposed record of the South American Platform's transition stage between 600 and 500 Ma, are what define the geology of the Caçapava UNESCO Global Geopark. Numerous surveys have identified several geosites in the geopark, including Serra do Segredo, Guaritas, and Minas do Camaqu, as having international significance. These geosites are also outstanding examples and exciting research locations in the field of geomorphology, notably in the study of cavernous weathering. In addition to being home to a wide variety of rare species of cacti, local flowers, and bees, the sedimentary hills and ranges that make up the Caçapava UNESCO Global Geopark are also of exceptional ecological significance.
Uberaba		Minas Gerais, Brazil	4523	2024	It features basalt flows documenting prehistoric volcanic activity, found in landmarks like the Serra da Galga and Serra Geral formations, overlaying sedimentary rocks containing a vast freshwater reserve within the Botucatu Formation. Named after the Tupi term Y-berab, meaning "clear water", the geopark alludes to the aquifer sustaining the Uberaba region. Branded as "Land of the Giants", it boasts a rich paleontological legacy, including over ten thousand fossils, such as the Uberabatitan ribeiroi, Brazil's largest dinosaur. The region's progress is marked by the introduction of the Zebu cattle breed in the late 19th century, catalyzing the development of the Brazilian livestock market and setting global benchmarks for sustainable breeding practices.
Comarca Minera, Hidalgo		Hidalgo State, Mexico; 20°08′37″N 98°40′26″W	1848	2017	The outstanding geodiversity of Comarca Minera is derived from its geological junction role with the Trans-Mexican Volcanic Belt and the Sierra Madre Oriental thrust and fold belt, as well as the overlap of two magmatic suites. Mining is a principal part of the geopark's heritage that exploited the globally important gold and silver deposits here. Other principal geosites include the Metztitlán Canyon, or Santa María Regla basalt columns, which comprises the longest such columns in the world.
Colca y Volcanes de Andagua		Arequipa Department; Peru; 15°36′31″S 72°05′29″W	6010.9	2019	According to its name, the geopark has two principal areas of geoheritage. The area encompasses 400 million years of geological records, but the main catalyst of the formation of the landscape is the Nazca Plate's subduction under the South American Plate, resulting volcanic activity, earthquakes and several landslides in the rugged surface. The Hualca-Ampato-Sabancaya volcanic complex presents 25 volcanic cones, some of them with recent activity, such as El Misti and the Andagua volcanic field. The other flagship of local geodiversity is the Colca Canyon, which is a geological textbook with its barely vegetated flanks and one of Earth's deepest canyonss.
Grutas del Palacio		Flores Department; Uruguay; 33°16′44″S 57°08′44″W	3611	2013	The gently undulating landscape of the geopark comprises a geological evolution, spanning from the Proterozoic to the Cenozoic. Granite inselbergs, outcrops of Paleozoic alluvial periods or the unique, name-bearing Grutas del Palacio, formed by the selective erosion of Mesozoic rocks some examples of the local geodiversity, that is hidden under the fertile pampas.
Imbabura		Imbabura Province; Ecuador; 0°15′30″N 78°10′42″W	4794,34	2019	Situated northern, Ecuadorian section of the Andes, covering the entire area of Imbabura Province, the landscape is formed by the Nazca Plate's subduction. A range of active, dormant and inactive volcanoes, a topography of high relief energy and outcrops of metamorphic and sedimentary rock as well can be found here. Iconic geosites include stratovolcanoes like Cotacachi or Imbabura and numerous lakes, like the caldera lake of Mojanda or Puruhanta of glacial origin.
Kütralkura		Araucanía Region; Chile; 38°41′22″S 71°40′49″W	8053	2019	The geodiversity of Kütralküra's geodiversity derives from volcanism and glaciation. Being part of the Southern Volcanic Zone of the Andes, 50 volcanoes are located in the geopark's territory, of which Llaima and Lonquimay are among the most active ones in Chile. Ice coverage is still observable in the higher regions of the stratovolcanoes, and the glacial lakes like Galletue or Icalma are testimony to the more extended coverage, reaching its maximum 20,000 years ago.
Mixteca Alta, Oaxaca		Drâa-Tafilalet Region; Mexico; 17°31′05″N 97°20′32″W	415,4	2017	Mixteca Alta in the Sierra Madre del Sur mountains is representative of the variety of Precambrian to Cenozoic bedrock and their spectacular erosive landscapes. Deeply rugged terrain of badlands, gullies, often unfolding paleosol layers are the most abundant of the geopark's geosites. The geological evolution is represented in the outcrops of Paleozoic plutonic rocks, Mesozoic tectonic features or remnants of Cenozoic volcanism.
Rio Coco		Madriz Department; Nicaragua; 13°19′59″N 86°30′00″W	954	2020	Nestled in Nicaragua, Río Coco Geopark boasts diverse geology and wildlife. Discovered by Czech geologists in 2004, it's now a top tourist spot. Somoto Canyon, carved by the river, is a highlight. The park's varied terrain includes canyons, mountains, and rivers flowing to the Caribbean and Pacific. Visitors enjoy rafting, kayaking, and cultural experiences. Must-see attractions include ancient petroglyphs and El Castillo ceremonial site.

Latin American Geoparks Network

== Aspiring and planned geoparks ==
According to the register of GeoLAC, the following geopark projects are in an aspiring phase (documentation close to submission to UNESCO or already submitted), or under planning, in a hatching phase.

Name	Location	Status
Volcán Tungurahua	Tungurahua Province; Ecuador; 1°28′12″S 78°26′41″W	aspiring
Litoral Biobío	Biobío Region; Chile; 36°48′34″S 73°02′15″W	under realization
Peña de Bernal and Sacred Triangle of Querétaro	Querétaro State; Mexico; 20°44′54″N 99°56′54″W	under realization
Napo Sumaco	Napo Province; Ecuador; 0°59′34″S 77°48′54″W	under realization
Pillán Mahuiza	Neuquén Province; Argentina; 40°09′40″S 71°21′36″W	under realization
Volcánico del Ruiz	Caldas Department; Colombia; 5°04′08″N 75°30′45″W	under realization
Huasteca Potosina	San Luis Potosí State; Mexico; 21°59′09″N 99°00′57″W	under realization
Torotoro	Potosí Department; Bolivia; 18°08′02″S 65°45′43″W	under realization
Corumbataí	São Paulo State; Brazil; 22°30′25″S 47°35′17″W	under realization

== The Latin American Geoparks Network ==
=== History ===
Geoparks incitatives in Latin America have been the subject of geoscience conferences since 2001 and the first member, Araripe, Brazil was admitted to the Global Geoparks Network in 2005. The 1st Latin American and the Caribbean Conference of Geoparks in 2010 issued the "Declaration of Araripe", stating that

“the conservation, valorisation and education of the Geological Heritage – the memory of the Earth–, the Natural Heritage and Cultural Heritage, tangible and intangible, are subject to sustainable development and correspond to the need and concerns of the people in the continental region of Latin America and the Caribbean" and "It shall allow the development of instruments for regional and global cooperation through exchange of experiences and management practices among Geoparks ..."

The "1st Symposium of Geoparks" in Arequipa, Peru issued the "Declaration of Arequipa", confirming the reaffirming the Declaration of Araripe and

"advancing with the operational guidelines of the Latin American and Caribbean UNESCO Global Geoparks... with the UNESCO Regional Office for Latin America and the Caribbean ... assuming the (transitory) responsibility of moving forward with the creation of the rules of operation and other communication objectives in conjunction with the signatory partners."

The official declaration of the foundation of the UNESCO Global Geoparks Network for Latin America and the Caribbean (GeoLAC) was issued in 2017 May, during the "4th Latin American and Caribbean Symposium on Geoparks", by four founding members (Araripe, Grutas del Palacio, Comarca Minera and Mixteca Alta UNESCO Global Geoparks).

The network was enlarged with 3 new members in 2019 (Colca y Volcanes de Andagua, Imbabura, Kütralküra) and aspiring and planned geoparks are also related to the regional geopark network.

== Recognition of Latin America's geodiversity under different international frameworks ==
=== World Heritage sites ===
Twelve sites are represented currently on the World Heritage list under criterion VIII, as outstanding representatives of Earth's history:

- Los Glaciares National Park (Argentina),
- Ischigualasto / Talampaya Natural Parks (Argentina),
- Talamanca Range-La Amistad Reserves / La Amistad National Park (Costa Rica, Panama),
- Desembarco del Granma National Park (Cuba),
- Morne Trois Pitons National Park (Dominica),
- Galápagos Islands (Ecuador),
- Sangay National Park (Ecuador),
- Río Plátano Biosphere Reserve (Honduras)
- El Pinacate and Gran Desierto de Altar Biosphere Reserve (Mexico)
- Huascarán National Park (Peru)
- Pitons Management Area (Saint Lucia)
- Canaima National Park (Venezuela)

Further sites are inscribed under criterion VII of superlative natural phenomena and aesthetic importance. Some of them, which have a special geoheritage importance are:

- Iguazu National Park (Argentina, Brazil),
- Los Alerces National Park (Argentina),
- Belize Barrier Reef Reserve System (Belize),
- Atlantic Forest South-East Reserves (Brazil),
- Pantanal Conservation Area (Brazil),
- Brazilian Atlantic Islands: Fernando de Noronha and Atol das Rocas Reserves (Brazil),
- Islands and Protected Areas of the Gulf of California (Mexico),
- Archipiélago de Revillagigedo (Mexico),
- Historic Sanctuary of Machu Picchu (Peru)
