= Geodiversity =

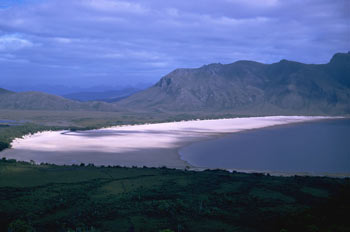
Lake Pedder, south west Tasmania, prior to inundation as part of a hydro-electric development. Submergence of this unique landform assemblage and geoheritage feature beneath 15 m of water was one of many triggers leading to the formulation of a geoconservation philosophy.

Geodiversity is the variety of earth materials, forms and processes that constitute and shape the Earth, either the whole or a specific part of it. Relevant materials include minerals, rocks, sediments, fossils, soils and water. Forms may comprise folds, faults, landforms and other expressions of morphology or relations between units of earth material. Any natural process that continues to act upon, maintain or modify either material or form (for example tectonics, sediment transport, pedogenesis) represents another aspect of geodiversity. However geodiversity is not normally defined to include the likes of landscaping, concrete or other significant human influence. Finally, geodiversity plays a prominent role in the functioning of the Earth Critical Zone, supporting the supply of multiple ecosystem services.

== Overview ==
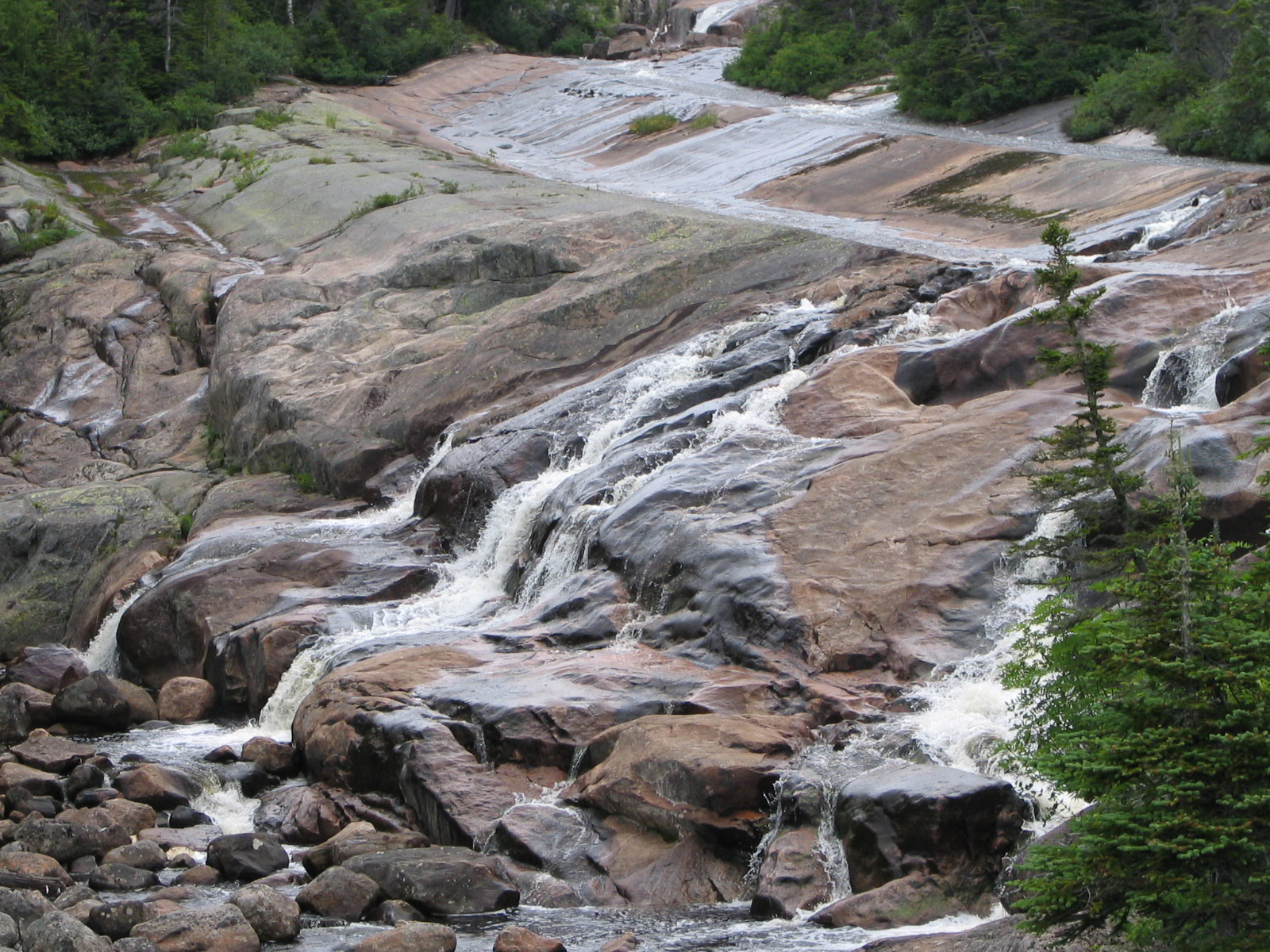
The glacial grooves in rock of the Canadian shield where the Sault Plat River rushes make it an exceptional geological site, Rivière-au-Tonnerre municipality, Quebec, Canada

Geodiversity is neither homogeneously distributed nor studied across the planet. The identification of geodiversity hotspots (e.g. the islands of Great Britain and Tasmania) may be indicative not simply of the distribution of geodiversity but also of the status of geoconservation initiatives. In this regard, the biodiversity of an ecosystem stems at least in part from its underlying geology. With the majority of biological species remaining undescribed, the classification and quantification of geodiversity is not an abstract exercise in geotaxonomy but a necessary part of mature nature conservation efforts, which also requires a geoethical approach.

According to Ponciano et al geoheritage may be in situ (important geosites bearing any exceptional value, such as scientific, cultural, educational, touristic, etc) and ex situ (minerals, fossils, minerals and rocks that were extracted from their origin site and housed in scientific collections and have notable scientific, cultural, educational, touristic or any other value. These authors also consider any extremely valuable reference to these geodiversity elements as ex situ geoheritage, including therefore field notebooks, papers, photographs, maps, dissertations, books, etc. These references often bear historical and scientific value as, for instance, paleontologist Kenneth Caster's field notebooks which provided informations on unknown fossil localities). Later (2016), José Brilha argues geodiversity may be of scientific value or valued for other aspects. Geodiversity of scientific value can be either geosites or geoheritage elements that are ex situ (not encompassing references to these elements such as dissertations, letters and field notebooks as geoheritage). Similarly geodiversity that is of little or no scientific value may be categorized as sites of geodiversity or geodiversity elements that are ex situ.

Geodiversity also constitutes an important part of developing nature-based solutions to global environmental challenges and demands for natural resources. For example, a recent study argued that the acute lack of considering geodiversity in international conventions and monitoring frameworks poses a threat to achieving the UN Sustainable Development Goals.

== See also ==
- Landscape diversity
- Paleontological heritage
