= Geoheritage =

Geological heritage

Geoheritage (a blend of geological and heritage) is the geological aspect of natural and cultural heritage. A geosite is a particular geological heritage asset. It is a heritage category comparable to other forms of natural heritage, such as biodiversity.

== History of the concept ==
The first reference to geoheritage as such appeared at a 1993 conference in the UK: the Malvern International Conference on Geological and Landscape Conservation.

The term geological heritage was first mentioned at the First International Symposium on the Conservation of our Geological Heritage at Digne, France in 1991. The matter is further discussed in 2002 by Sharples.

Conceptually, geoheritage derives from various writings of Busby et al. 2001 and Hallam 1989).

In Sharples 1995, the original concept of geoheritage was further developed to include the protection of dynamic geological processes and geodiversity.

In Sadry 2021 the concept of geoheritage has been further developed to include planetary and space geology.

== Definition ==
"Geoheritage encompasses global, national, statewide, and local features of geology, at all scales that are intrinsically important sites or culturally important sites offering information or insights into the evolution of the Earth; or into the history of science, or that can be used for research, teaching, or reference."

The definition of geoheritage is based on the Regulation of the Minister of Energy and Mineral Resources of the Republic of Indonesia No.1 of 2020 concerning Guidelines for the Determination of Geological Heritage (Geoheritage): Geological Diversity (Geodiversity), which has more value as a legacy because it is a record of what has happened or is happening on Earth due to its value. Scientifically high, rare, unique, and beautiful, so that it can be used for research and education on Earth.

== Geotourism ==
"Geotourism is a knowledge -based tourism, an interdisciplinary integration of the tourism industry with conservation and interpretation of abiotic nature attributes, besides considering related cultural issues, within the geosites for the general public." It is seen around the world through the growth of geoparks as well as independently in many natural and urban areas where tourism’s focus is on the geological environment.

== Examples of geoheritage sites ==
=== Australia ===
In Australia, the term geoheritage appeared initially in Bradbury (1993), and Sharples (1993).

In Australia there are sites which have natural features (such as Fossil Hill at Cliefden Caves, NSW); cultural features (such as the site of the discovery of the first limestone in inland Australia at Cliefden Caves); scenically important sites such as the Three Sisters in the Blue Mountains, of New South Wales, Australia; and indigenous culturally important sites such as Uluru in the Northern Territory.

=== Indonesia ===
The Geological Agency of the Indonesian Energy and Resources Ministry has declared nine geological sites in the province of Yogyakarta in Indonesia. These are:

In Sleman Regency:

- Eocene limestone at Gamping (just to the west of Yogyakarta city).
- Pillow lava at Berbah (south of Prambanan temple area).
- Prehistoric volcanic sediment at Candi Ijo (south of Prambanan temple area).
- Prambanan temple area (east of Yogyakarta city).

In Bantul Regency:

- Sand dunes at Parangtritis beach (south of Yogyakarta city).

In Kulon Progo Regency:

- Kiskendo cave and a former site of manganese mining (over 8,000 ha) in the Kliripan area.

In Gunung Kidul Regency:

- Nglanggerang prehistoric volcano (near Patuk, east of Yogyakarta city).
- Wediombo-Siung beach (on the south coast of Java).
- A bioturbation site on the Kali Ngalang (Ngalang river) near Ngalang village north of Wonosari.

=== Spain ===
The Geological Society of Spain and the Geological and Mining Institute of Spain have produced a list of internationally important geosites (sites of geological interest known as LIGS in Spanish). This work, which began in 1999, is part of the Global Geosites project promoted by the International Union of Geological Sciences in the 1990s and subsequently supported by UNESCO. Initially, geological contexts were identified (21 such contexts were listed by 2014), and then representative sites within these themes. The list of sites is not closed, and there is a mechanism for considering further nominations.

Teide volcano, Tenerife, has been designated a World Heritage Site in part for its geological interest. Some other WHSs in Spain are of geological interest, but were selected for other features. For example, Spain has one of the two sites of the WHS Heritage of Mercury. Almadén and Idrija. However, the criteria by which Almadén was assessed by UNESCO relate to its mining heritage rather than geological interest.

=== Ethiopia ===
With its diversified lithology, dissected landscapes and rock churches, there is a large amount of geoheritage in Ethiopia. Among the better documented geosites there is the Zeyi cave in Dogu'a Tembien.

== See also ==
- Asia Pacific Geoparks Network
- European Geoparks Network
- Geoconservation
- Geopark
- Global Geoparks Network
- List of National Geoparks
