= International Geoscience Programme =

International Geoscience and Geoparks Programme
- Abbreviation: IGCP
- Formation: 1972
- Type: INGO
- Region served: Worldwide
- Official language: English, French
- Parent organization: International Union of Geological Sciences (IUGS)
- Website: IGCP Official website

The International Geoscience and Geoparks Programme (IGCP) is a cooperative enterprise of UNESCO (the United Nations Educational, Scientific and Cultural Organization) and the International Union of Geological Sciences (IUGS).

It was launched in 1972 and originally termed the International Geological Correlation Programme, the source of the acronym IGCP which it retains. For decades the programme was known as the International Geoscience Programme. In November 2015 the name was changed to International Geoscience and Geoparks Programme as the global geoparks were made part of the programme.

The aim of the IGCP is to facilitate research cooperation among geoscientists across frontiers and national boundaries, through joint research work, meetings and workshops. At the present time IGCP has about 400 active projects involving thousands of scientists from about 150 countries.
