= List of volcanoes in China =

This is a list of active and extinct volcanoes in China.

| Name | Elevation | | Location coordinates | Last eruption |
| Name | meters | feet | Location coordinates | Last eruption |
|---|---|---|---|---|
| Changbai Mountain | 2744 | 9003 | 41.98°N 128.08°E | 1903 |
| Honggeertu | 1700 | 5577 | 41.47°N 113.00°E | Holocene |
| Jingpo Lake | 500 | 1640 | 44.08°N 128.83°E | 520 BC |
| 23 peaks in the Keluo field | 670 | 2198 | 49.37°N 125.92°E | Holocene |
| Kunlun (See also Kunlun Mountains) | 5808 | 19,055 | 35.50°N 80.20°E | 1951 |
| 74 others in the Leizhou Peninsula fields | 259 | 850 | 20.83°N 109.78°E | Holocene |
| Longgang | 1000 | 3281 | 42.33°N 126.50°E | 350 |
| Several around Tengchong County | 2865 | 9399 | 25.23°N 98.50°E | 5050 BC |
| Tianshan Volcanic Group | - | - | 42.50°N 86.50°E | 650 |
| Tianyang (田洋) | – | – | 20.52°N 110.30°E | Holocene |
| Turfan | - | - | 42.90°N 89.25°E | 1120 (±150 years) |
| Northern Tibet volcanic field | 5400 | 17716 | 35.85°N 91.70°E | Holocene |
| Wudalianchi volcanic field | 597 | 1959 | 48.72°N 126.12°E | 1776 |
| Yingfengling | – | – | 20.56°N 110.19°E | Holocene |
| 72 peaks of Mount Xiqiao | 346 | 1156 | 22.58°N 112.58°E | Eocene (Extinct) |

== Volcanic fields in China ==
- The Arshan volcanic field is found in the Greater Khingan mountain range, it contains more than 40 cenozoic volcanic cones.
- The Honggeertu volcanic field consists of 12 cinder cones which may be holocene
- The Jingbo volcanic field is in the Jingpo Lake region of Heilongjiang province
- The Keluo volcanic field may have had historic eruptions
- The Kunlun Volcanic Group last had an eruption on 27 May 1951, and consists of at least 70 pyroclastic cones
- The Longgang volcanic field contains 150 scoria cones but only one of holocene age
- the Qionglei volcano group (also known as the Leiqiong volcanic field) stretches across the Qiongzhou Strait north of Hainan island – so is made up of two parts:
  - The Hainan Dao volcanic field is the southern part consisting of 58 Pleistocene-Holocene tholeiitic cones
  - The Leizhou Bandao volcanic field is the northern part including the stratovolcanoes Tiangyang and Yingfengling as well as several pyroclastic cones, it lies just west of Zhanjiang City
- The Rehai geothermal field which is part of the Tengchong volcanic district (Tengchong) has had 20 hydrothermal eruptions since 1993
- The Tianshan volcano group contains the historically active cone Pechan
- The Wudalianchi volcanic field erupted in 1720–1721 forming the five lakes at Wudalianchi, and again in 1776

== See also ==
- List of mountains in China
