= List of UNESCO Global Geoparks in Asia =

List of Asia Pacifica Geoparks
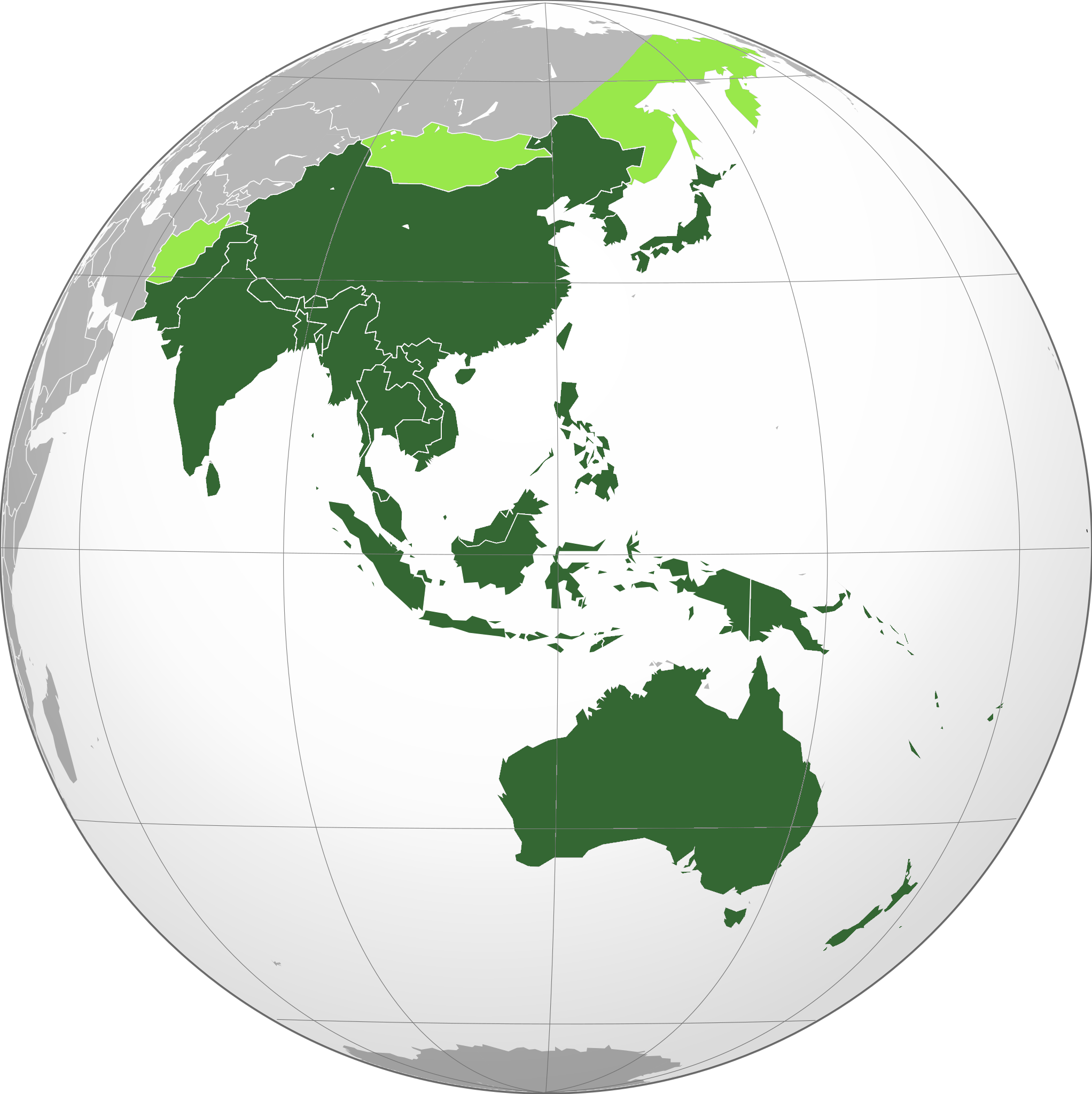
- Region of the Asia Pacific geoparks
- Location: China, 41 sites Indonesia, 10 sites Iran, 1 site Japan, 9 sites Malaysia, 2 sites Philippines, 1 site Republic of Korea, 4 sites Thailand, 2 sites Vietnam, 2 sites

In this List of UNESCO Global Geoparks in Asia, the term "Asia" means the UNESCO regional network of "Asia Pacifica", which is not a distinction of continents. Anatolia, historically the first Greek "Asia", from Luwian aswiya, today is part of the European Geoparks Network, as is western Russia. As there are not yet any geoparks in Siberia, or eastern Russia, the question of what geopark region it is remains unsettled. Hence the "Asia" portion of Asia Pacifica means southern and central Asia from Iran to Japan with Southeast Asia, which merges into the undefined "Pacifica", presumably involving islands of the Pacific. They must include Australia and New Zealand, not generally considered Southeast Asian or part of Asia. Strictly speaking, distinctions of continent are not being embraced.

All UNESCO regions, however, distinguish the regions by their nations, as part of the bottom up structure of UNESCO geopark networks. A geopark must first apply for accreditation in a "National Geopark Network", if it exists, or its equivalent if it does not. "National Geopark" is a label affixed by UNESCO to noteworthy parks or park systems within a nation. Once accredited there, the geopark applies (through its managers) to the Asia Pacific Geoparks Network (APGN). Only after its certification as a regional geopark can it apply for certification as a UNESCO Global Geopark, the international network, of which there is only one.

As of 2022, there are 65 geopark members in the APGN from 8 countries, of which 41 are situated in China.

== Certified Global Geoparks in the APGN ==
A certified global geopark is necessarily a certified regional geopark, here the APGN, and a certified national geopark. If any of the three levels of certification are missing for a park, it cannot be a global geopark and does not appear in the list.

UNESCO Global Geopark	Image	Location	Area (km^{2})	Year	Ref's
Alxa Desert		China, Inner Mongolia; 38°51′25″N 105°43′47″E	630.37	2009	
Arxan		China, Inner Mongolia; 47°10′27″N 119°56′20″E	3653.21	2017	
Dali-Cangshan		China, Yunnan; 25°46′48″N 100°42′00″E	933	2014	
Danxiashan		China, Guangdong; 25°02′25″N 113°44′16″E	292	2004	
Dunhuang		China, Gansu; 40°13′59″N 92°53′00″E	2067	2015	
Fangshan		China, Beijing, Hebei; 39°43′59″N 115°55′02″E	954	2006	
Funiushan		China, Henan; 33°26′06″N 112°10′53″E	1522	2006	
Guangwushan-Nuoshuihe		China, Sichuan; 32°18′42″N 106°38′11″E	1818	2018	
Hexigten		China, Inner Mongolia; 43°14′49″N 117°30′12″E	1750	2005	
Hong Kong		Hong Kong, China; Hong Kong; 22°21′50″N 114°22′30″E	150	2011	
Huanggang Dabieshan		China, Hubei; 30°43′46″N 115°03′13″E	2625.54	2018	
Huangshan		China, Anhui; 29°41′26″N 118°19′34″E	160.6	2004	
Jingpohu		China, Shandong; 43°58′23″N 129°02′04″E	1400	2006	
Jiuhuashan		China, Anhui; 30°26′00″N 117°49′59″E	139.7	2019	
Keketuohai		China, Xinjiang; 47°19′05″N 90°01′35″E	2337.9	2017	
Leiqiong		China, Hainan; 19°56′37″N 110°12′39″E	3050	2006	
Leye Fengshan		China, Guangxhi Zhuang; 24°34′11″N 106°44′26″E	930	2010	
Longhushuan		China, Jiangxi; 28°06′04″N 116°57′57″E	996.63	2008	
Lushan		China, Jiangxi; 29°33′30″N 115°59′09″E	500	2004	
Mount Kunlun		China, Qinghai; 35°49′12″N 94°52′48″E	7033	2014	
Ningde		China, Fujian; 26°39′41″N 119°31′35″E	2660.34	2010	
Qinling Zhongnanshan		China, Shaanxi; 33°51′05″N 108°47′01″E	1074.85	2009	
Sanqingshan		China, Jiangxi; 28°48′22″N 117°58′20″E	229.5	2012	
Shennongjia		China, Hubei; 31°44′43″N 110°40′52″E	1022.72	2013	
Shilin		China, Yunnan; 24°45′20″N 103°16′47″E	350	2004	
Songshan		China, Henan; 34°29′22″N 112°55′15″E	464	2004	
Taining		China, Fujian; 26°53′55″N 117°10′36″E	350	2004	
Taishan		China, Shandong; 36°16′01″N 117°04′16″E	158.63	2006	
Tianzhusan		China, Anhui; 30°31′28″N 117°03′31″E	413.4	2011	
Wangwushan-Daimeishan		China, Henan; 35°15′57″N 112°34′17″E	986	2006	
Wudalianchi		China, Heilongjiang; 48°28′55″N 126°12′10″E	720	2004	
Xingwen		China, Sichuan; 28°18′35″N 105°03′19″E	156	2005	
Yandangshan		China, Zhejiang; 28°21′07″N 121°05′40″E	298.8	2005	
Yanqing		China, Beijing; 40°42′53″N 116°24′00″E	620.38	2013	
Yimengshan		China, Shandong; 35°30′58″N 117°49′04″E	1804.76	2019	
Yuntaishan		China, Henan; 35°17′41″N 113°14′58″E	556	2004	
Zhangjiajie		China, Hunan; 29°18′50″N 110°26′24″E	398	2004	
Zhijindong Cave		China, Guizhou; 26°45′00″N 105°55′59″E	174	2015	
Zigong		China, Sichuan; 29°19′29″N 104°45′56″E	1630.46	2008	
Batur		Indonesia, Bali; 8°24′34″S 115°22′30″E	370.5	2012	
Belitung		Indonesia, Bangka Belitung Islands; 2°50′S 107°55′E	4800	2021	
Ciletuh-Palabuhanratu		Indonesia, Sukabumi; 7°10′54″S 106°27′44″E	1260	2018	
Gunung Sewu		Indonesia, Gunung Kidul, Wonogiri, Pacitan; 8°02′38″S 110°46′34″E	1802	2015	
Ijen		Indonesia, East Java; 8°03′29″S 114°14′31″E	4723	2023	
Maros-Pangkep		Indonesia, South Sulawesi; 4°50′S 119°32′E	5077	2023	
Merangin Jambi		Indonesia, Jambi; 4°50′S 119°32′E	4832	2023	
Raja Ampat		Indonesia, Southwest Papua; 0°14′00″S 130°30′28″E	36660	2023	
Rinjani		Indonesia, Lombok; 8°34′37″S 116°04′59″E	2800	2018	
Toba Caldera		Indonesia, North Sumatra; 2°53′N 98°31′E	1130	2020	
Aso		Japan, Kumamoto; 32°00′00″N 131°00′00″E	1198	2014	
Itoigawa		Japan, Niigata; 37°49′55″N 139°14′02″E	750	2009	
Izu Peninsula		Japan, Shizuoka; 34°51′21″N 138°55′19″E	2027	2018	
Mt. Apoi		Japan, Hidaka; 42°06′28″N 143°01′31″E	364.3	2015	
Muroto		Japan, Kōchi; 33°14′46″N 134°10′38″E	248.2	2011	
Oki Islands		Japan, Shimane; 36°08′45″N 133°10′19″E	673.5	2013	
San'in Kaigan		Japan, Kyoto, Shin'onsen, Tottori; 35°38′33″N 134°40′50″E	2458	2010	
Toya-Usu		Japan, Abuta; 42°35′29″N 140°50′14″E	1181	2009	
Unzen Volcanic Area		Japan, Nagasaki; 32°46′06″N 130°20′41″E	459.52	2009	
Qeshm Island		Iran, Hormozgan; 26°49′01″N 55°54′38″E	2063	2017	
Langkawi		Malaysia, Langkawi; 6°19′47″N 99°48′56″E	478	2015	
Bohol Island		Philippines, Bohol; 9°51′24″N 124°16′04″E	8,808	2023	
Cheongsong		South Korea, Gyeongbuk; 36°26′10″N 129°03′25″E	845.71	2017	
Jeju Island		South Korea, Jeju-do; 33°30′20″N 126°31′33″E	1847	2010	
Mudeungsan		South Korea, Jeollanam-do; 35°08′03″N 126°57′20″E	1051	2018	
Satun		Thailand, Satun; 7°05′27″N 99°46′06″E	2597	2018	
Khorat		Thailand, Nakhon Ratchasima; 14°51′31″N 102°01′32″E	3167	2023	
Dong Van Karst Plateau		Vietnam, Ha Giang; 23°11′32″N 105°11′49″E	2356	2015	
Non nuoc Cao Bang		Vietnam, Cao Bang; 22°42′31″N 106°19′55″E	3000	2018	

== See also ==
- National geoparks of China
