= Longgang volcanic field =

Volcanic field in Jilin Province, China

Longgang is a volcanic field in Jilin Province, China. It is also known as Chingyu, Longwan Group or Lung-wan Group. This volcanic field contains over 164 individual centres in the form of crater lakes, maars and volcanic cones and covers a surface area of 1,700 square kilometres (660 sq mi). The field is forested and mostly undisturbed by human activities.

Longgang is located in an area of northeast China where the subduction of the Pacific Plate beneath the Eurasian Plate, along with other tectonic processes triggers volcanic activity. Some other volcanoes are found in the region, most importantly Changbaishan volcano which is found in the neighbouring Changbaishan volcanic field (120km to the East).

Volcanic activity in the field goes back to the Pleistocene. Jinlongdingzi cone suffered a major Plinian eruption in 350 AD or 460 AD, which was accompanied by ash fall and the extrusion of a lava flow. Future volcanic activity in the field may result in hazardous Plinian eruptions.

== Geography and geological context ==
Northeast China is the site of major Cenozoic volcanism. The Pacific Plate subducts beneath the Eurasian Plate, along with back-arc spreading and continental rifting triggers volcanic activity in the region. Geothermal resources are also widespread.

Longgang belongs to a group of volcanoes in the Changbai Mountains. 200 kilometres (120 mi) farther east lies the Changbaishan volcanic field, including Changbaishan volcano on the China-North Korea border. This volcano is the most active and dangerous in the area, and the sole volcano to erupt felsic magma. Tephra from this volcano has been found in the Longgang field and tephra deposits at Longgang have been used to reconstruct volcanism in the wider region. Other volcanoes in the wider region include Jingbo Lake, Keluo, Wudalianchi and Xianjindao. The last of these is in North Korea.

Seismic tomography of Longgang volcano has evidenced a 200 kilometres (120 mi) low-velocity anomaly, which tilts north beneath this depth until a depth of 400 kilometres (250 mi). Some neighbouring volcanoes feature similar anomalies. Based on these structures, it has been concluded that Changbaishan and Longgang are back-arc volcanoes associated with processes involving the sinking Pacific Plate slab. The Tan-Lu fault zone and the Fushun-Mishan fault may further influence Longgang volcanism.

== Geology and geomorphology ==
The field covers a surface area of 1,700 square kilometres (660 sq mi) with 164 individual centres. It contains lava flows, over 150 cinder cones and 8 tuff rings. 9 or 8 maars are found in the field's western half. These maars have depths ranging between 15–127 metres (49–417 ft). The towns of Houhe, Jilin and Jingyu are located in the eastern part of the field. The area was historically sparsely inhabited and it was turned into a national forest park in 1992.

Jinlongdingzi is a 240 metres (790 ft) high, horseshoe-shaped cone formed by lava bombs and scoria(999 metres (3,278 ft) elevation, 42°2′0″N 126°26′0″E), it also known as Gold Dragon Peak. Another volcano formed by basalt and tephra is known as Dayizishan.

A number of crater lakes surrounded by forests exist in the Longgang field, which formed when water filled volcanic craters Among the volcanic centres of Longgang, the 0.39 square kilometres (0.15 sq mi) large Sihailongwan maar southeast-east of Jinlongdingzi has been used for dating volcanic activity through sediment layers in the lakes. Similar research has been performed on other maars. This maar is surrounded by a 10–119 metres (33–390 ft) high rim composed of pyroclastic material and was formed by phreatomagmatic activity. 0.85 square kilometres (0.33 sq mi) large Hanlongwan is a dry maar north of Jinlongdingzi and is surrounded by a 10 metres (33 ft) high rim. Xiaolongwan maar is surrounded by a 5–100 metres (16–328 ft) high crater rim and covers a surface area of 0.079 square kilometres (0.031 sq mi). Erlongwan maar covers a surface of 0.3 square kilometres (0.12 sq mi). Other maars are Dalongwan, Donglongwan, Longquanlongwan, Nanlongwan and Sanjialongwan; the Gushantun peatland is a former maar as well. Lava flows from the field dammed the Hani River during the late Pleistocene, forming a lake that later developed into the Hani peatland. Overall, more than 100 crater lakes and lava-dammed lakes and over 20 peatlands in maars occur in the Longgang volcanic field.

The volcanic field is constructed on a basement formed by rocks of Archaean age, such as the Anshan Migmatites consisting of amphibolite, gneiss and quartzites form the basement. The field is located at the edge of the North China Craton which underlies the volcanic field.

=== Petrology ===
Rocks include basalt and trachybasalt. Olivine basalt, basanite and tholeiite have been found as well, with smaller amounts of trachyandesite. Tephras from different eruptions do not display significant differences in composition. Ultramafic xenoliths have been found in the rocks.

Phenocrysts include olivine, plagioclase and pyroxene. Alkali basalts have few vesicles and a gray colour. Basanites contain more olivine and less plagioclase/pyroxene phenocrysts. No non-basaltic magmas have been erupted at Longgang.

Partial melting of metasomatism-influenced mantle may be the origin of Longgang magmas. Some of the magmas underwent fractionation after their formation, but not all. The magmas appear to come from a magma chamber at a depth of 35–50 kilometres (22–31 mi), whether it underwent fractional crystallization and assimilation of crustal materials or not is unclear.

== Environment ==
Vegetation around the Hani peatland and Sihailongwan lake consists of broadleaf-coniferous forest. Peatlands have developed in some parts of the field. Some lava flows erupted from Jinlongdinzi now feature vegetation distinct from the pre-flow vegetation, including Abies nephrolepis and Betula platyphylla. Human influence is limited.

Airmasses come from central Asia during winter, while in summer southeasterlies from the Pacific Ocean dominate. The climate is overall cool. The average air temperatures at Xiaolongwan and Sihailongwan are 4 °C (39 °F), with the lakes freezing between November and April. Average precipitation is 760 metres (2,490 ft), mostly during summer and makes the climate monsoonal.

The Longgang volcanic field contains climate records that have been used to reconstruct the former climate of the region, both in the form of deposits in lakes and in peatlands. Some of these records may go back over 12,000 years. Fluctuations of the strength of the winter and summer monsoons have been reconstructed from the peatlands. Two cold periods may coincide with two stages of Heinrich event 1 over 10,000 years ago. During the Medieval Climate Anomaly the climate was moister than during the Little Ice Age. Past environmental changes, such as peat growth and red tides in lakes, also leave records.

== Eruptive history ==
Volcanism occurred over three different phases, the Xiaoyishan period 2,150,000 - 750,000 years ago, the Longgang period 680,000 - 50,000 years ago and a third period during the Holocene. The oldest volcanic rocks are 27.3 million years old. Most centres formed between 680,000 and 50,000 years ago. Dayizishan and Diaoshuiu formed 71,000 ± 9,000 and 106,000 ± 13,000 years ago, respectively.

Tephra layers found in lakes indicate that explosive volcanism was common in the field during the late ice age.Varve chronology has indicated the occurrence of eruptions 11,460 and 14,000 years before present; the first may have occurred at Jinlongdingzi where a second eruption occurred between 10,340-10,250 years ago. A tephra layer dated 15 BC - 26 AD is chemically similar to the one of Jinlongdingzi and may stem from an eruption in the Longgang field.

The youngest eruption occurred about 350 AD or 460 AD at Jinlongdingzi; although another date mentions an eruption 785 years before present and a lava flow that entered lake Dalongwan may be only a few centuries old. The 350/460 AD eruption of Jinlongdingzi caused ash fall east of the cone. This basaltic ash formed black layers in lakes and is known as the Sihai layers; it covers a surface area of 330 square kilometres (130 sq mi). This eruption was the second largest eruption of a Chinese volcano in the past 2000 years, with a total volume of 0.024 cubic kilometres (0.0058 cu mi) of tephra that fell from a 7,000–8,000 metres (23,000–26,000 ft) high eruption column. It was probably forceful enough to damage the surrounding vegetation and trigger wildfires. A long lava flow was erupted from the western flank of Jinlongdingzi and went on for at least 26 kilometres (16 mi).

Volcanic activity at Jinlongdingzi may still constitute a danger, especially Plinian eruptions. A new eruption may result in damage to property or fatalities especially east of the cone and the field is thus considered a potentially active volcano. Hot springs are found in the area, and there is ongoing uplift at a rate of 3–4 millimetres per year (0.12–0.16 in/year), and the field is among the most seismically active regions of Jilin. Seismic tomography shows evidence of crustal melts persisting beneath Longgang, and magnetotelluric analysis has found areas of partial melts, one under Jinlongdingzi and a larger one under the uplifting area. The 2008 Wenchuan earthquake triggered seismicity in the Longgang volcanic field.

== Use ==
Rocks from the Jinlongdingzi eruption have been used to simulate the properties of lunar rocks for applications in lunar exploration.
