= Longgang =

Longgang may refer to the following locations in mainland China or Taiwan:

== County-level divisions ==
- Longgang, Zhejiang (龙港市)
- Longgang District, Huludao (龙港区), Liaoning
- Longgang District, Shenzhen (龙岗区), Guangdong

== Towns ==
- Longgang, Jiangsu (龙冈镇), in Yandu District, Yancheng

Written as "龙岗镇":

- Longgang, Fengshun County, Guangdong
- Longgang, Kaiyang County, in Kaiyang County, Guizhou
- Longgang, Linqu County, in Linqu County, Shandong
- Longgang, Hangzhou, in Lin'an District, Hangzhou, Zhejiang

Written as "龙港镇"

- Longgang, Yangxin County, Hubei, in Yangxin County, Hubei
- Longgang, Qinshui County, in Qinshui County, Shanxi

== Others ==
- Longgang volcanic field
- Longgang railway station (龍港車站), in Miaoli County, Taiwan
