= Haikou Volcanic Cluster Global Geopark =

National park in Hainan, China

Coordinates: 19.933028°N 110.221343°E

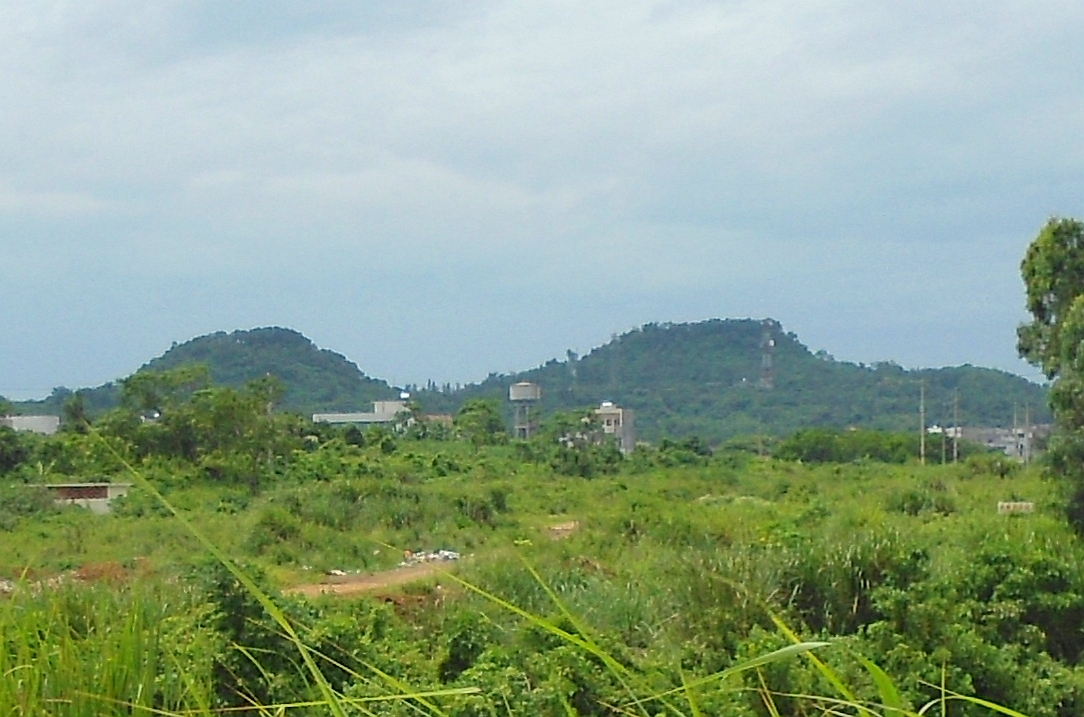

Geography
- Location: Hainan, China

Geology
- Mountain type: Volcanic field

Haikou Volcanic Cluster Global Geopark (Chinese: 雷琼世界地质公园), also known as Haikou Scenic-Shishan Volcano Cluster, Leiqiong Global Geopark, Haikou Crater Park, and Hainan Crater Park is a national park located approximately 8 mi south of Haikou, Hainan, China. It is named for a crater, one of many extinct volcanoes on the island.

The park has a total area of 118 square kilometres. It contains the two towns Shishan Town and Yongxing Town, and more than 40 Quaternary volcanoes. Part of the area is called Mount Maanling (Saddle) Crater Scenic Area. This area consists of the two major volcanoes, Mount Fengliung (furnace) and Mount Baoziling. Together they appear as a saddle, hence the name. Adjacent to these, there are another two volcanoes, one of which is called Mount Yanjinglin.

== See also ==
- Hainan Volcanic Field
- List of volcanoes in China
- List of UNESCO Global Geoparks in Asia
