= Streptomyces sporangiiformans =

Scientific classification
- Domain: Bacteria
- Kingdom: Bacillati
- Phylum: Actinomycetota
- Class: Actinomycetia
- Order: Streptomycetales
- Family: Streptomycetaceae
- Genus: Streptomyces
- Species: S. sporangiiformans

Binomial name
- Streptomyces sporangiiformans Zhao et al. 2020

Type strain
- NEAU-SSA 1

Species of bacterium

Streptomyces sporangiiformans is a bacterium species from the genus Streptomyces which has been isolated from soil from the Mount Song.

== See also ==
- List of Streptomyces species
