= Keluo =

Dormant volcanic field in China

Keluo Volcanic Field
- Location within China

Highest point
- Elevation: 542 m (1,778 ft)
- Coordinates: 49°37′0″N 125°22′0″E

Geography
- Location: China,

Geology
- Mountain type: Cinder cone
- Last eruption: ~ 300 years ago

Keluo (Chinese: 科洛, p Kēluò) is a dormant volcanic field 310 kilometers (190 mi) north-by-northwest of Daquijin in northeastern China. It is located at an intersection of regional lineaments trending northeast and northwest; the volcanoes were erupted through basement igneous and sedimentary rocks from the Jurassic to Cretaceous, through granite, and through pre-Permian metasediments. Like the Wudalianchi volcanic to its south, it contains high-potassium basaltic cinder cones.

The field possesses 23 cones over an area of 350 km^{2} (140 sq mi). There are reports of historical activity, but these remain unconfirmed. The morphology of a number of the cones—including Nanshan (南山), Gushan (孤山), Jianshan (尖山), Dayishan (大椅山), and Xiaoyishan (小椅山)—suggests their formation during the last 10,000 years (the Holocene). Most cones to the northeast, however, probably date from the Pleistocene to the Tertiary.

Other peaks include Dangzishan, Heishan, and Muhenanshan.

== See also ==
- List of volcanoes in China
- List of volcanic fields
