= Taiping Township, Wudalianchi =

Taiping Township 太平乡
- Township
- Location in Heilongjiang Taiping Township (China)
- Coordinates: 48°26′41″N 125°52′19″E
- Country: People's Republic of China
- Province: Heilongjiang
- Prefecture-level city: Heihe
- County-level city: Wudalianchi
- Time zone: UTC+8 (China Standard)

Taiping Township (simplified Chinese: 太平乡; traditional Chinese: 太平鄉; pinyin: Tàipíng Xiāng) is a township in Wudalianchi, Heihe, Heilongjiang, China. As of 2020, it has eight villages under its administration:

- Taiping Village
- Changgeng Village (长庚村)
- Ping'an Village (平安村)
- Nanquan Village (南泉村)
- Zhenxing Village (振兴村)
- Qingmin Village (庆民村)
- Qingfeng Village (庆丰村)
- Aimin Village (爱民村)
