= Wudalianchi Dedu Airport =

Airport in Heilongjiang, China

Wudalianchi Dedu Airport 五大连池德都机场
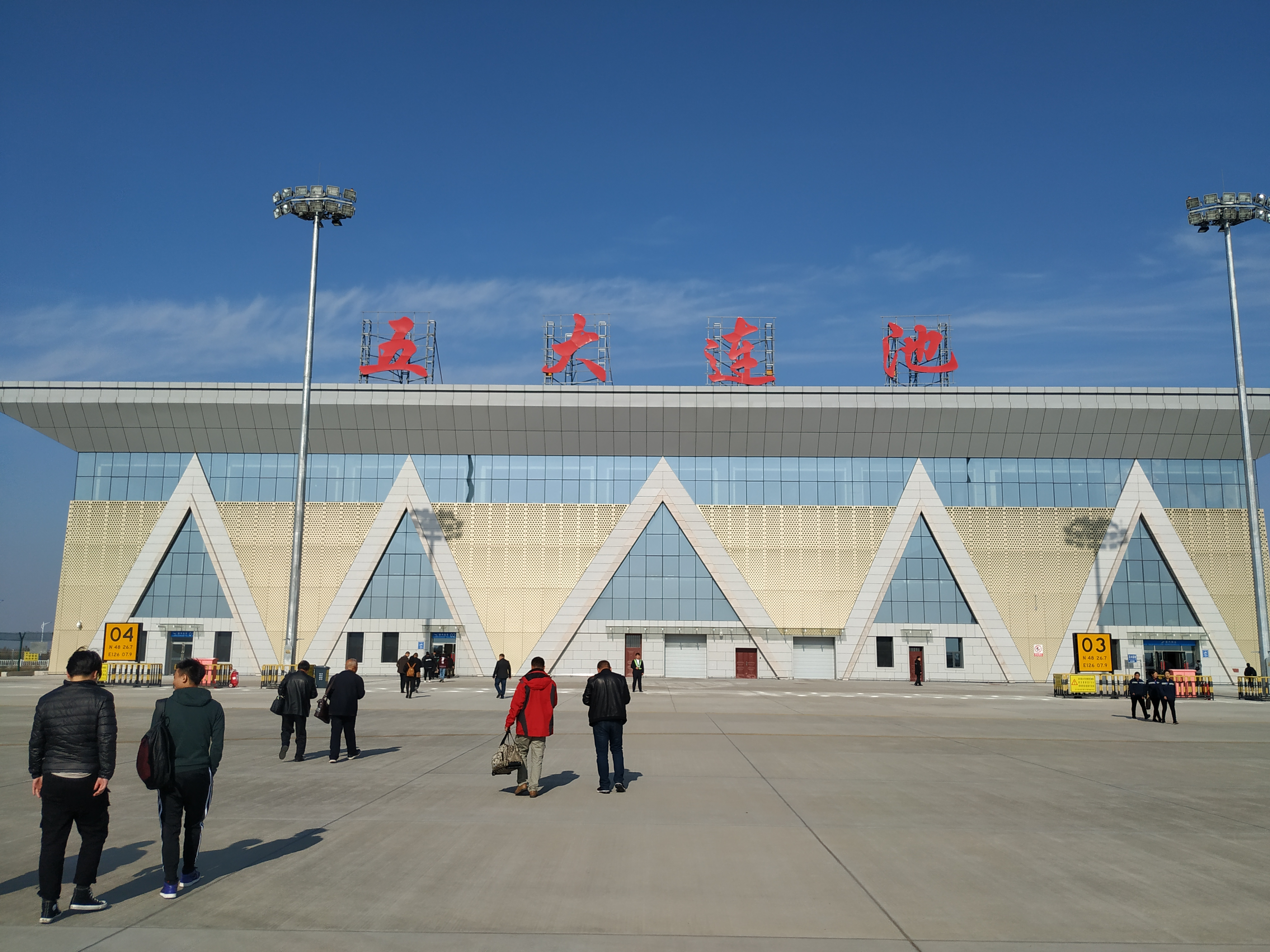
- IATA: DTU; ICAO: ZYDU

Summary
- Airport type: Public
- Serves: Wudalianchi, Heilongjiang, China
- Opened: 22 November 2017
- Elevation AMSL: 300 m / 984 ft
- Coordinates: 48.445°N 126.133°E

Map
- Location of airport in Heilongjiang

Runways
Direction	Length		Surface
Direction	m	ft	Surface
08/26	2,500	8,202

Statistics (2021)
- Passengers: 34,084
- Aircraft movements: 814

Wudalianchi Dedu Airport
- Simplified Chinese: 五大连池德都机场
- Traditional Chinese: 五大連池德都機場
Transcriptions
Standard Mandarin
- Hanyu Pinyin: Wǔdàliánchí Dédū Jīchǎng

Wudalianchi Dedu Airport (IATA: DTU, ICAO: ZYDU) is an airport serving the city of Wudalianchi in Heilongjiang province of Northeast China, southwest of the city center and 11 kilometres (6.8 mi) from Wudalianchi National Park.

It received approval from the State Council of China and the Central Military Commission on 25 December 2013. Its construction budget was 644.41 million yuan, and an additional 74 million yuan for related infrastructure outside the airport. The airport was opened on 22 November 2017, with an inaugural Loong Air flight from Harbin Taiping International Airport.

== Facilities ==
The airport has a 2,500-metre (8,200 ft) runway (class 4C), capable of handling Boeing 737s and Airbus A320s, and a 3,000-square-metre (32,000 sq ft) terminal building. It is designed to handle 300,000 passengers and 1,500 tons of cargo annually by 2020.

== Airlines and destinations ==
Airlines	Destinations
Chengdu Airlines	Harbin, Heihe, Mohe

== See also ==
- List of airports in China
- List of the busiest airports in China
