= Dunhuang Yardang National Geopark =

Protected area in Gansu Province, China

Dunhuang UNESCO National Geopark
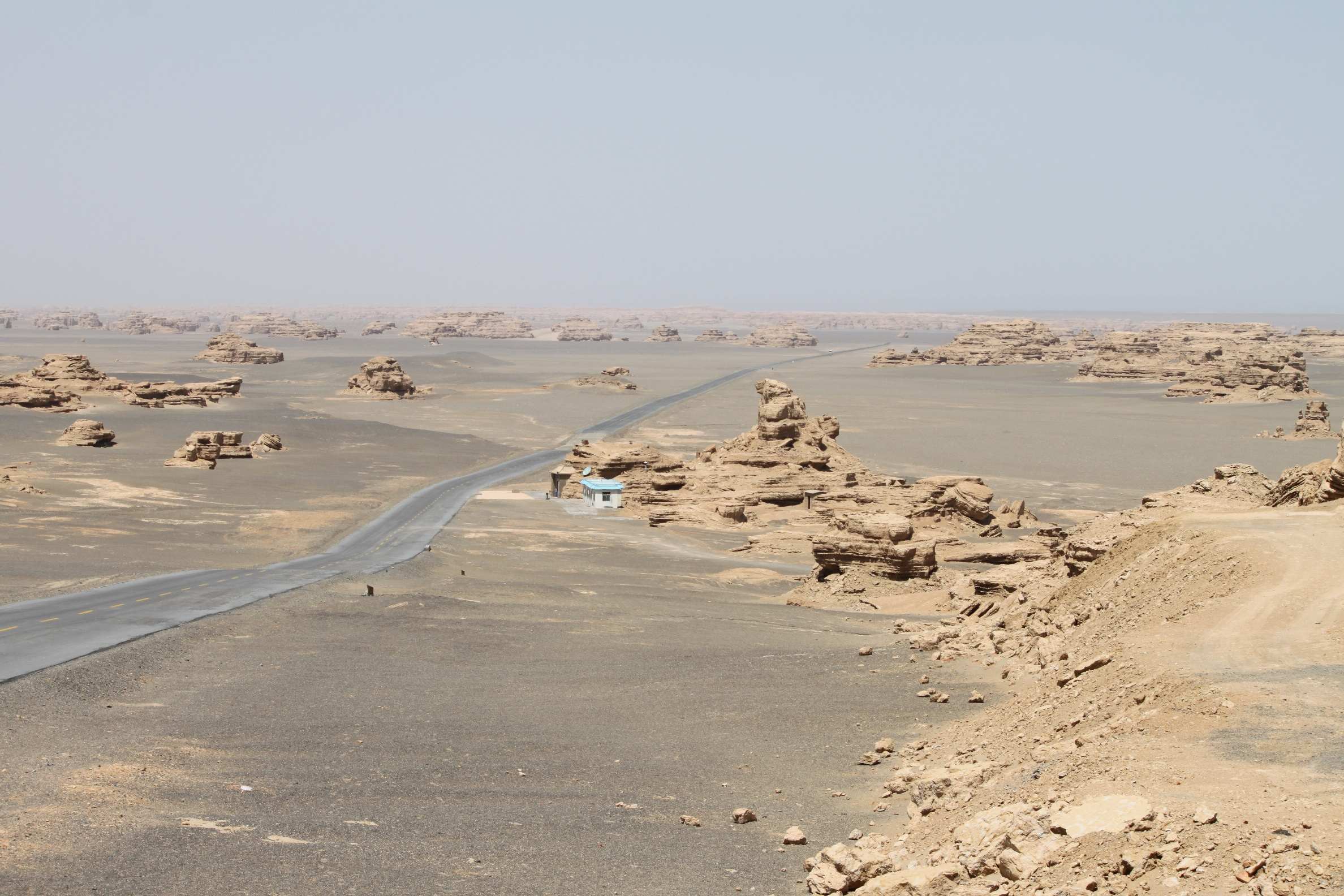
- Landscape within Dunhuang National Geopark
- Interactive map of Dunhuang UNESCO National Geopark
- Location: Gansu Province, China
- Nearest town: Dunhuang
- Coordinates: 40°31′50″N 93°03′52″E
- Website: http://www.dhdzgy.com/

Dunhuang Yardang National Geopark (Chinese: 敦煌雅丹国家地质公园), officially Dunhuang UNESCO National Geopark (China), is a 2015 approved UNESCO national geopark in Dunhuang, Gansu Province, China, that shows the Yardang geological feature of the area. Fully certified, the park must also be a member of the regional network, in this case the Asia Pacific Geoparks Network and the Global Geopark Network. Yardangs, the chief feature of geologic interest, were created over time by the soft part of the earth's surface being eroded by wind and rain, with the hard part of the rocks remaining in the desert.

The geopark is located about 180 kilometers northwest of Dunhuang's town center and covers an area of 398 square kilometers. Some of the uniquely shaped rocks in the geopark are named "Mongolian Bao", "Camel", "Stone Bird", "Peacock", "The Golden Lion Welcoming His Guests" (Chinese: 金狮迎客), etc.

The unique rock formations in the park developed over a period of 700,000 years. The Yardang geomorphic formations found in the Dunhuang Yadan National Geopark are the largest in China.

One of the most remarkable sites in the Dunhuang Yadan National Geopark is the Yardang Ghost Town. Located within the Ghost Town is the Aisikexiaer Castle. The word 'Aisikexiaer' means 'old city' in the Uyghur language.

Due to increase of tourism a research project evaluated impact of tourism and the tourists cognition of the geopark. The researches suggested, that the administration of Dunhuang UGGp change the schedule of tour routes, highlight geotourism, and foster the popularization of science and technology (PST) through activities within the geopark that support inquiry-based learning and facilitate geointerpretation and lively learning.

== Gallery ==
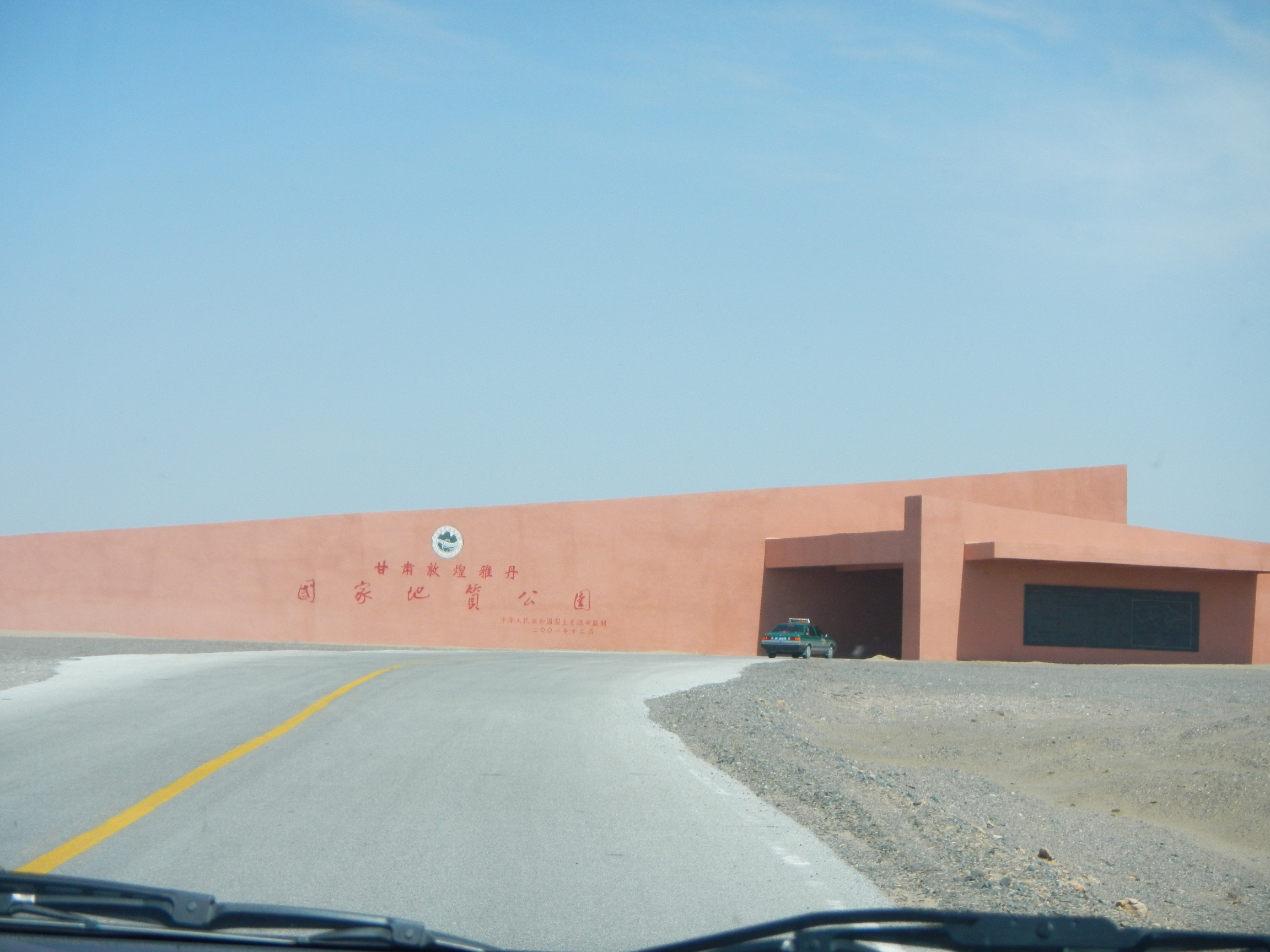
The entrance to Dunhuang Yardang National Geopark

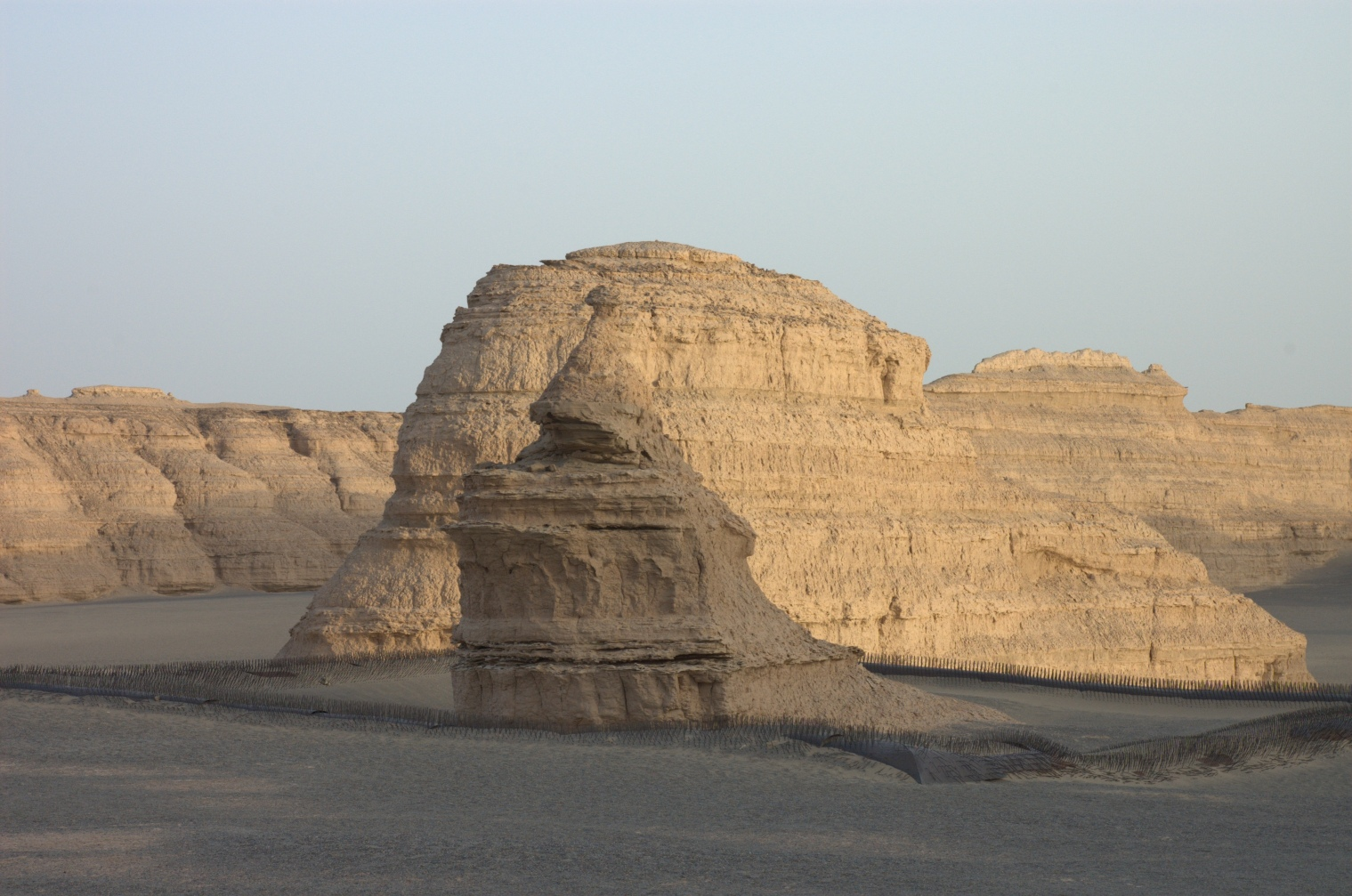
Peacock

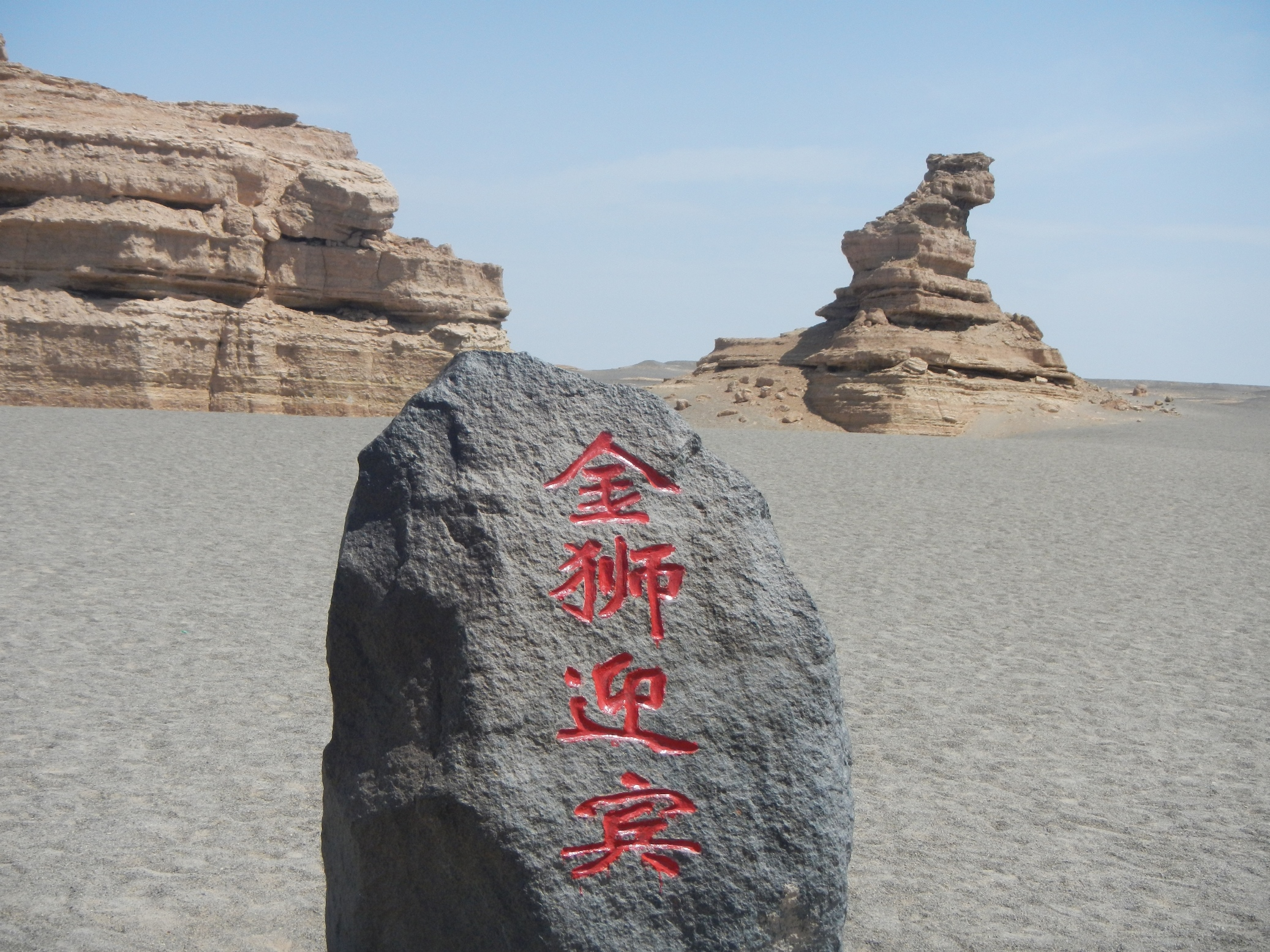
"The Golden Lion Welcoming His Guests"

== See also ==
- National Geoparks of China
