= Hainan Volcanic Field =

Volcanic field in Hainan, China

Coordinates: 19.933°N 110.221°E

Hainan Volcano Field

Highest point
- Elevation: Unknown

Geography
- Location: Hainan, People's Republic of China.

Geology
- Mountain type: pyroclastic cones
- Last eruption: June to July 1933

The Hainan Volcanic Field is a 4,100 square kilometres (1,600 sq mi) volcanic field covering the northern half of Hainan, People's Republic of China. Although mostly Pleistocene-Holocene in age, minor eruptions have been recorded in the 19th and 20th centuries.

The field is made up of 58 Pleistocene-Holocene tholeiitic cones. The two best preserved cones (Leihuling and Ma'anshan (马鞍山)) are on an East-West fracture line that contains 30 young cones in the Shishan (石山) and Yongzing regions. Historically, small fissure eruptions have been recorded from the Lingao and Chengmai areas.

Two eruptions have been reported in recent history. A small fissure eruption took place from Lingao cone in the Lingao area sometime in 1883. Another small fissure eruption took place from the Nansheling Ridge in the Chengmai area on June 26 (date accurate to within plus or minus 4 days), 1933. This eruption probably ended on July 8, 1933.

== See also ==
- Haikou Volcanic Cluster Global Geopark
- List of volcanic fields
