= Tianshan Volcanic Group =

Volcanic field in China

- Location within China

Highest point
- Coordinates: 42°30′0″N 82°30′0″E

Geography
- Location: China
- Parent range: Tian Shan

Geology
- Mountain type: Volcanic field
- Last eruption: 650 CE ± 50 years

The Tianshan Volcanic Group is a volcanic field in the Tianshan Mountains in Northwest China. The historically active Cone of Pechan is within the group (also known as Peishan, Baishan, Hochan, Aghie, Bichbalick, Khala, and Boschan). The volcano is 440 km southwest of Urumqi, Xinjiang.

== Eruptions ==
Two eruptions are known from Tianshan, in 50 AD (± 50 years) and 650 AD (± 50 years). The book, Aspects of Nature in Different Lands and Different Climates, Volume 1, reports that Pechan cone sent out streams of lava in the seventh century. The Chinese General, Teu-Hian (who was fleeing from the Chinese army) said that when climbing the Tianshan Mountains, saw "The Fire Mountains which send out masses of molten rock which flow for many Li".
