= Merangin Geopark =

Geological park in Indonesia

Coordinates: 2.373374°S 101.874025°E

Merangin Jambi Geopark
- Location within Indonesia
- Location: Merangin Regency, Jambi, Indonesia
- Nearest city: Jambi city
- Area: 4,832.31 square kilometer
- Established: 2012

Merangin Jambi Geopark is a national Geopark at Merangin Regency, Jambi Province that located on Sumatra Island, Indonesia. There are three main of geological uniqueness in the Merangin Jambi Geopark (MJGp). Fossils of “Jambi Flora” represent the West Sumatra Terrane of Cathaysialand with Euramerican Flora, karst landscape represent a mesozoic era with prehistoric artefacts and Masurai Caldera represents the Quaternary volcanic.

In the Early Permian at the end of the Paleozoic glaciation, ecosystem stability and the resulting taxonomic statis that existed for plants forest in the Late Carboniferous were disturbed. Early Permian fossils collection from Merangin Jambi Geopark in Mengkarang Formation consist in Parasequences. Flora fossil Permian is composed of general ration of seed ferns flora like Pecopterids, Calamites and Cordaites, rare new Permian Flora exist like Gigantopterids. Early conifers also present in Mengkarang like Tobleria bicuspis in Merangin river.

The geological diversity in the Merangin Jambi Geopark area is also increasingly complemented by the presence of karst stretches in the Sungai Manau which have a variety of landscapes, both exokarst and endokarst. The karst is formed by limestone, this rock unit is a shallow sea exposure deposit, orientation to the southwest. It belong to Peneta Formation of the Late Jurassic Member of Mersip. The rock layers contain molluscs and small veins of quartz and calcite are visible. Merangin Jambi Geopark completed with Masurai Complex with tectonic volcanic phenomena that have caused the formation of several landscapes such as lakes, waterfalls, and hotspring manifestations that are still active process today. Caldera Masurai was formed from a large eruption on the VEI scale 6 at 33,000 years ago.

It is being proposed to become member of UNESCO Global Geopark (UGG) to be recognized UNESCO by 2023. It takes about six hours journey from Jambi City to reach the Merangin Jambi Geopark.

== Description ==
The Geopark has a land area of 4,832.31 square kilometer.The name was taken from the name of the administrative area, namely Merangin Regency and Jambi Province. The use of the word Jambi in the name Geopark not only refers to the administrative territory of the Jambi Province, but is also a statement of pride in the Jambi Flora Fossil. In the Merangin Jambi Geopark area, you can find rock characteristics up to more than 200 million years ago, especially regarding the discovery of the Jambi Flora Fossil since 1926. Due to this uniqueness, the Merangin Jambi Geopark area has been designated as a National Geopark in 2013. The main theme raised in the MJGp area is “Merangin Jambi Represent Finest and Complete The Last Early Permian Flora Fossils”, namely tree and sea fossils that are 300 million years old (Perem, Paleozoic) are found in the Merangin River as thick as 500 m, and are the only ones left in the world.

In addition, there is also a stretch of karst with a variety of landscapes, both exokarst and endokarst and has traces of ancient relics, therefore also the Mount Masurai complex with volcanic tectonic phenomena that caused the formation of several landscapes such as lakes, lakes, waterfalls, columnar joints, and geothermal manifestations which are still ongoing today. This complex is also a habitat for rare/protected flora and fauna and contains the history of past civilizations. All of these geological uniqueness are in a single area that can be found in the Merangin Jambi Geopark area.

Administratively, the area consists of 12 sub-districts in Merangin Regency, with a total of 131 villages. This area stretches as far as ± 121 km from the east to the west and ± 117 km from the north to the south. The main road route is the National Road route on the south-north route with a distance of ±80 km, then the east-west route for ±140 km. The land route to surround the Mount Masurai area is ±112 km.

== Attraction ==
The old rocks that lie along the river, the fossils of plants and trees on the banks of the river, making it a natural tourist attraction and exotic history tour. Swift rivers are also a rafting location. Several times this location is used as a place of international rafting competition. Merangin Geopark has attracted many foreign researchers coming, from Europe, America, Malaysia and Japan.

== See also ==
- List of National Geoparks
