= List of national geoparks =

This list includes areas designated as "geopark" on the national level. This should not be confused with members of either the European Geoparks Network or the UNESCO Global Geoparks Network.

== Australia ==
- Kanawinka Geopark

== Austria ==
- Kamptal Geopark

== Brazil ==
- Geopark Paleorrota

== Bulgaria ==
- Iskar–Panega Geopark

== China ==
- Protected areas of the People's Republic of China

== Czech Republic ==
- Bohemian-Moravian Highlands Geopark
- Blaník Knights County Geopark
- Egeria Geopark
- GeoLoci Geopark
- Iron Mountains Geopark
- Moravian-Silesian Foothills Geopark
- Ralsko Geopark

== Germany ==
- Bergstraße-Odenwald
- Bayern–Böhmen
- GrenzWelten
- Harz - Braunschweiger Land - Ostfalen
- Inselsberg – Drei Gleichen
- Kyffhäuser
- Laacher See
- Muskau Arch
- Porphyrland
- Ries
- Ruhrgebiet
- Sachsens Mitte
- Schieferland
- Schwäbische Alb
- TERRA.vita
- Vulkaneifel
- Vulkanregion Vogelsberg
- Westerwald–Lahn–Taunus

== Indonesia ==
- Batur
- Belitung
- Ciletuh-Palabuhanratu
- Gunung Sewu
- Ijen
- Kebumen Geopark
- Maros-Pangkep
- Merangin Jambi
- Meratus
- Raja Ampat
- Rinjani
- Toba Caldera

== Japan ==
- Tokachi Shikaoi Geopark (Hokkaido)
- Shirataki Geopark (Hokkaido)
- Tokachidake Geopark (Hokkaido)
- Mikasa Geopark (Hokkaido)
- Shimokita Geopark (Aomori)
- Sanriku Geopark (Aomori, Iwate, Miyagi)
- Happo-Shirakami Geopark (Akita)
- Oga Peninsula-Ogata Geopark (Akita)
- Mt. Chokai & Tobishima Island Geopark (Yamagata, Akita)
- Yuzawa Geopark (Akita)
- Mt. Kurikoma Area Geopark (Miyagi)
- Zao Geopark (Miyagi)
- Bandaisan Geopark (Fukushima)
- Mt. Asama North Geopark (Gunma)
- Shimonita Geopark (Gunma)
- Chichibu Geopark (Saitama)
- Mt. Tsukuba Area Geopark (Ibaraki)
- Choshi Geopark (Chiba)
- Hakone Geopark (Shinagawa)
- IzuOshima Geopark (Tokyo)
- Sado Island Geopark (Niigata)
- Naeba-Sanroku Geopark (Niigata, Nagano)
- Minami-Alps (MTL Area) Geopark (Nagano)
- Tateyama Kurobe Geopark (Toyama)
- Nanki Kumano Geopark (Nara, Wakayama)
- Shimane Peninsula and Shinjiko Nakaumi Estuary Geopark (Shimane)
- Hagi Geopark (Yamaguchi)
- Mine Akiyoshidai Karst Plateau Geopark (Yamaguchi)
- Shikoku Seiyo Geopark (Ehime)
- Tosashimizu Geopark (Kochi)
- Miyoshi Geopark (Tokushima)
- Oita Himeshima Geopark (Oita)
- Oita Bungoono Geopark (Oita)
- Kirishima Geopark (Miyazaki, Kagoshima)
- Sakurajima-Kinkowan Geopark (Kagoshima)

== South Africa ==
- Barberton Geopark
- Vredefort Meteor Impact Site
- tswaing geopark

== Turkey ==
- Ida Madra Geopark
- Kızılcahamam-Çamlıdere Geopark
- Nemrut-Süphan Geopark
- Sivas-Upper Kızılırmak Geopark
- Zonguldak Coal Geopark

== United Kingdom ==
There are no 'national Geoparks' within the UK (as at July 2020); there are however a number of UNESCO Global Geoparks.

== Vietnam ==
- Dong Van Karst Plateau Geopark
- Nonuoc Cao Bang Geopark
- Daknong Geopark
- Lyson - Sahuynh Geopark
- Langson Geopark

== See also ==
- Protected area
