= Wudalianchi =

Wudalianchi 五大连池市
- County-level city
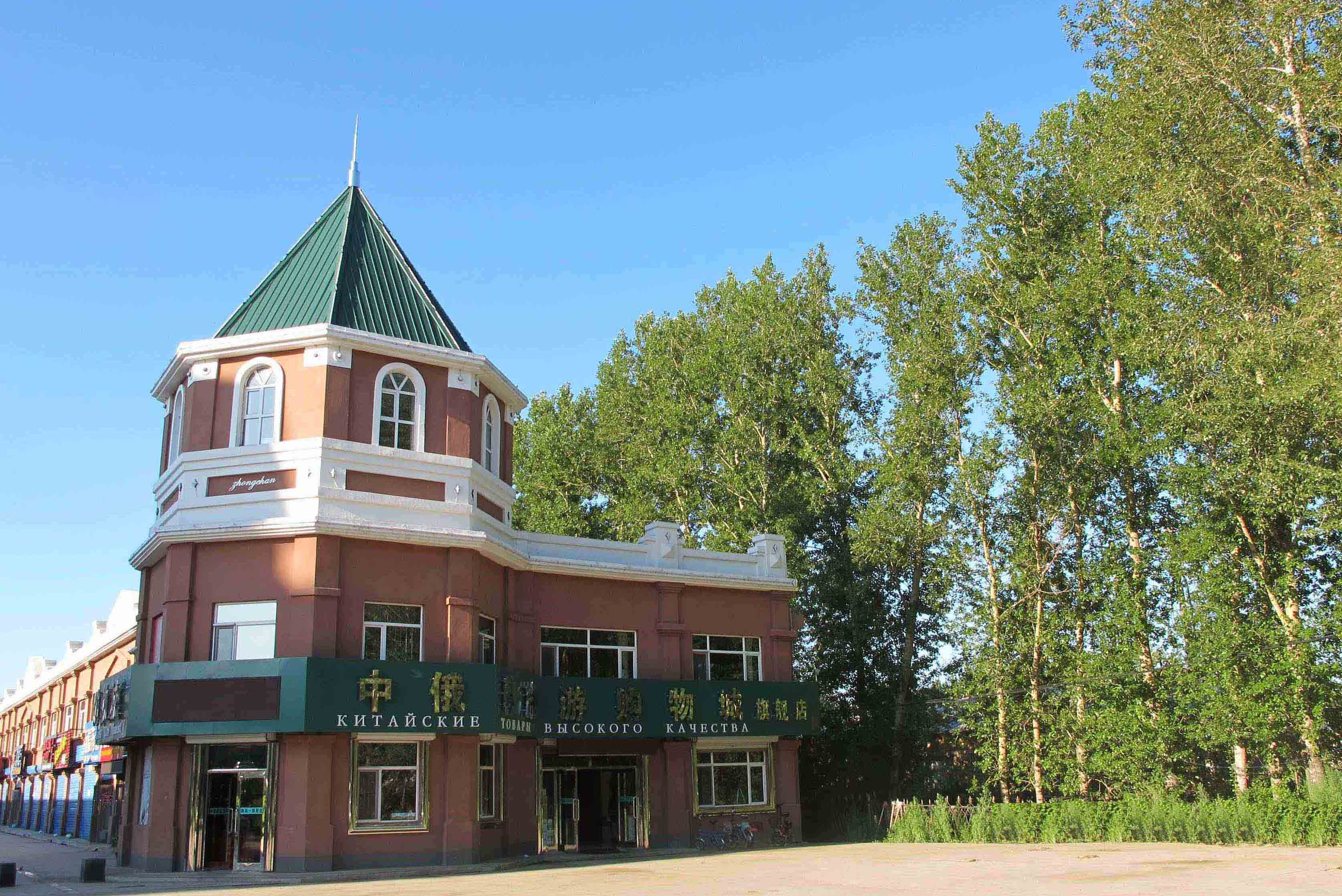

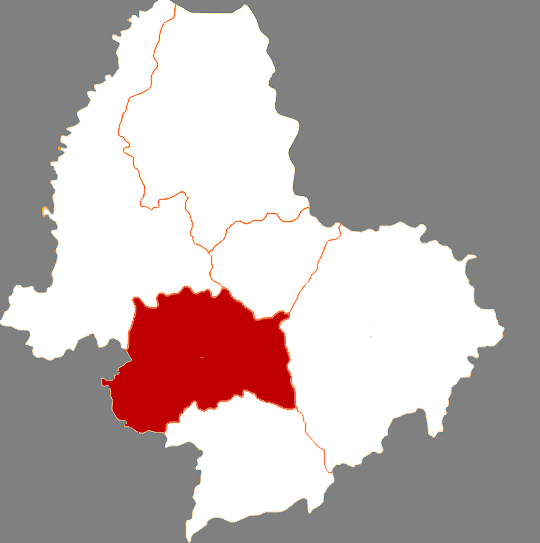
- Location of Wudalianchi City within Heihe

- Location in Heilongjiang
- Coordinates: 48°45′N 126°10′E
- Country: People's Republic of China
- Province: Heilongjiang
- Prefecture-level city: Heihe

Area
  - Total: 8,745.01 km^{2} (3,376.47 sq mi)

Population (2020)
  - Total: 243,283
  - Density: 27.8196/km^{2} (72.0525/sq mi)
- Time zone: UTC+8 (China Standard)
- Postal code: 164100
- Area code: 0456
- Climate: Dwb
- Website: www.hljwdlc.gov.cn

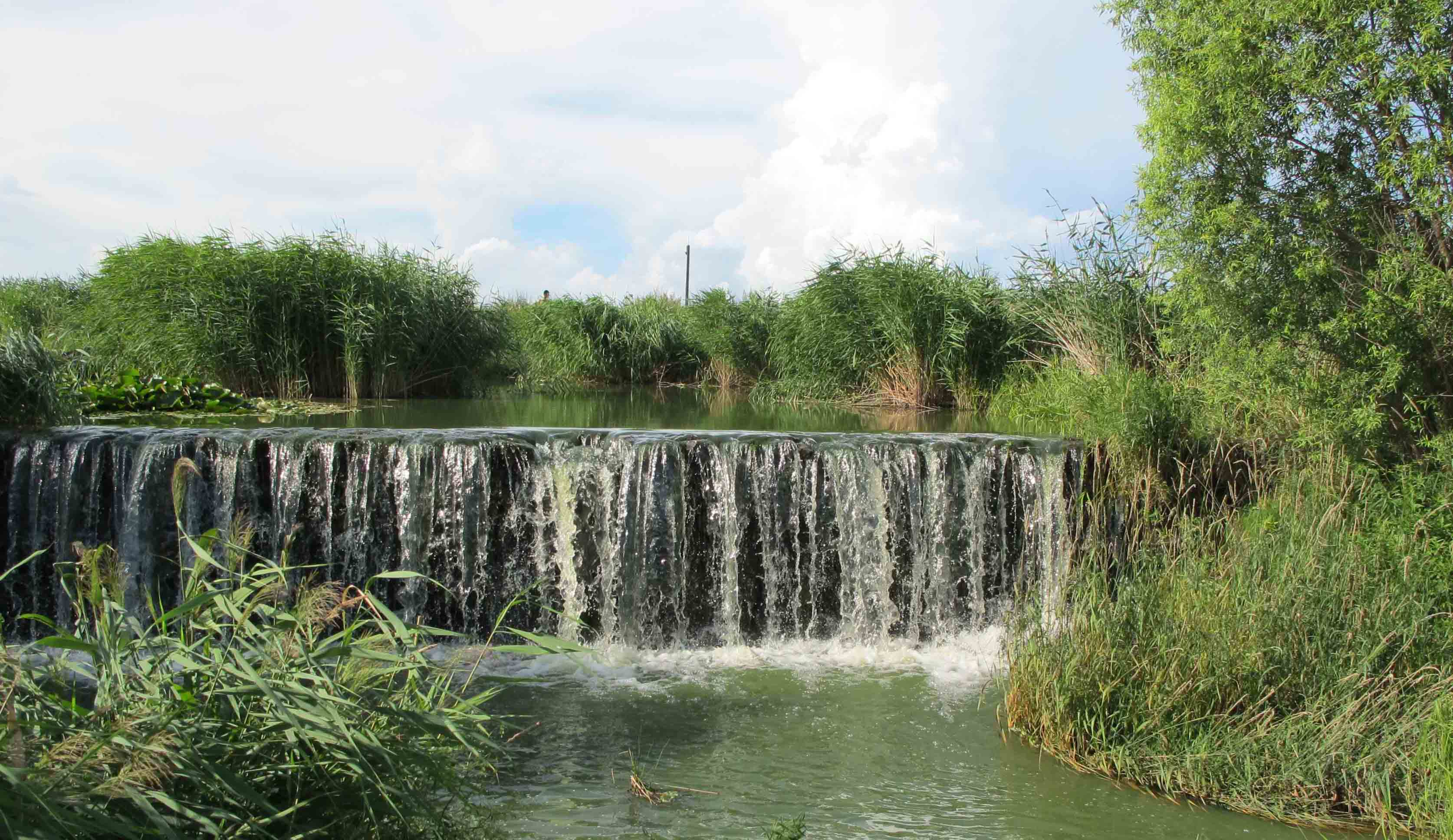
Waterfalls at the Wudalianchi Geological Park (Chinese: 五大连池世界地质公园)

Wudalianchi (Chinese: 五大连池; pinyin: Wǔdàliánchí), formerly Dedu County (德都县), is a county-level city in Heilongjiang province, Northeast China, under the jurisdiction of the prefecture-level city of Heihe. The city is served by Wudalianchi Dedu Airport.

The city's name literal means "five great joint ponds", referring to a set of interconnected volcanogenic lakes formed after the eruption of the Laoheishan (老黑山, means "Old Black Mountain") and Huoshaoshan (火烧山, means "Fire Burn Mountain") volcanoes in 1720–21. The city's territory incorporates part of a volcanic field, which contains a APGN- and UNESCO-listed geopark.

== Administrative divisions ==
Wudalianchi City is divided into 1 subdistrict, 7 towns and 4 townships.

1 subdistrict

- Qingshan (青山街道)

7 towns

- Long (龙镇), Heping (和平镇), Wudalianchi (五大连池镇), Shuangquan (双泉镇), Xinfa (新发镇), Tuanjie (团结镇), Xinglong (兴隆镇)

4 townships

- Jianshe (建设乡), Taiping (太平乡), Xing'an (兴安乡), Zhaoyang (朝阳乡)

== Demographics ==
The population of the district was 355,397 in 1999.

== Climate ==
Climate data for Wudalianchi, elevation 267 m (876 ft), (1991–2020 normals, extremes 1981–present)
Month	Jan	Feb	Mar	Apr	May	Jun	Jul	Aug	Sep	Oct	Nov	Dec	Year
Record high °C (°F)	−4.0 (24.8)	5.3 (41.5)	19.6 (67.3)	28.0 (82.4)	35.3 (95.5)	39.0 (102.2)	36.5 (97.7)	33.3 (91.9)	35.1 (95.2)	26.4 (79.5)	11.9 (53.4)	3.3 (37.9)	39.0 (102.2)
Mean daily maximum °C (°F)	−16.8 (1.8)	−10.7 (12.7)	−0.6 (30.9)	11.2 (52.2)	19.8 (67.6)	25.2 (77.4)	26.9 (80.4)	24.9 (76.8)	19.3 (66.7)	9.5 (49.1)	−4.4 (24.1)	−15.2 (4.6)	7.4 (45.4)
Daily mean °C (°F)	−23.3 (−9.9)	−18.4 (−1.1)	−7.4 (18.7)	4.8 (40.6)	13.2 (55.8)	19.1 (66.4)	21.6 (70.9)	19.3 (66.7)	12.8 (55.0)	3.3 (37.9)	−10.2 (13.6)	−20.9 (−5.6)	1.2 (34.1)
Mean daily minimum °C (°F)	−29.0 (−20.2)	−25.4 (−13.7)	−14.4 (6.1)	−1.9 (28.6)	5.9 (42.6)	12.7 (54.9)	16.4 (61.5)	14.1 (57.4)	6.6 (43.9)	−2.3 (27.9)	−15.4 (4.3)	−26.2 (−15.2)	−4.9 (23.2)
Record low °C (°F)	−43.0 (−45.4)	−43.6 (−46.5)	−37.4 (−35.3)	−14.3 (6.3)	−6.1 (21.0)	0.8 (33.4)	8.3 (46.9)	3.4 (38.1)	−6.1 (21.0)	−20.5 (−4.9)	−33.5 (−28.3)	−42.6 (−44.7)	−43.6 (−46.5)
Average precipitation mm (inches)	4.0 (0.16)	4.2 (0.17)	7.9 (0.31)	20.2 (0.80)	43.8 (1.72)	88.8 (3.50)	146.4 (5.76)	107.8 (4.24)	70.4 (2.77)	23.7 (0.93)	8.6 (0.34)	6.4 (0.25)	532.2 (20.95)
Average precipitation days (≥ 0.1 mm)	6.4	3.9	4.8	6.5	10.8	13.5	14.3	13.7	10.4	6.6	6.7	7.3	104.9
Average snowy days	9.1	5.7	7.1	4.4	0.4	0	0	0	0.1	3.6	9.0	10.3	49.7
Average relative humidity (%)	72	70	62	53	54	68	79	81	72	64	70	74	68
Mean monthly sunshine hours	181.6	213.5	263.2	257.1	279.9	273.9	266.8	256.6	239.2	207.0	175.5	161.9	2,776.2
Percentage possible sunshine	66	74	71	62	59	57	55	59	64	63	64	63	63
Source: China Meteorological Administration All-time Oct extreme

== See also ==
- List of UNESCO Global Geoparks in Asia
- Wudalianchi volcanic field
