= Mount Song =

Mountain range in Henan, China

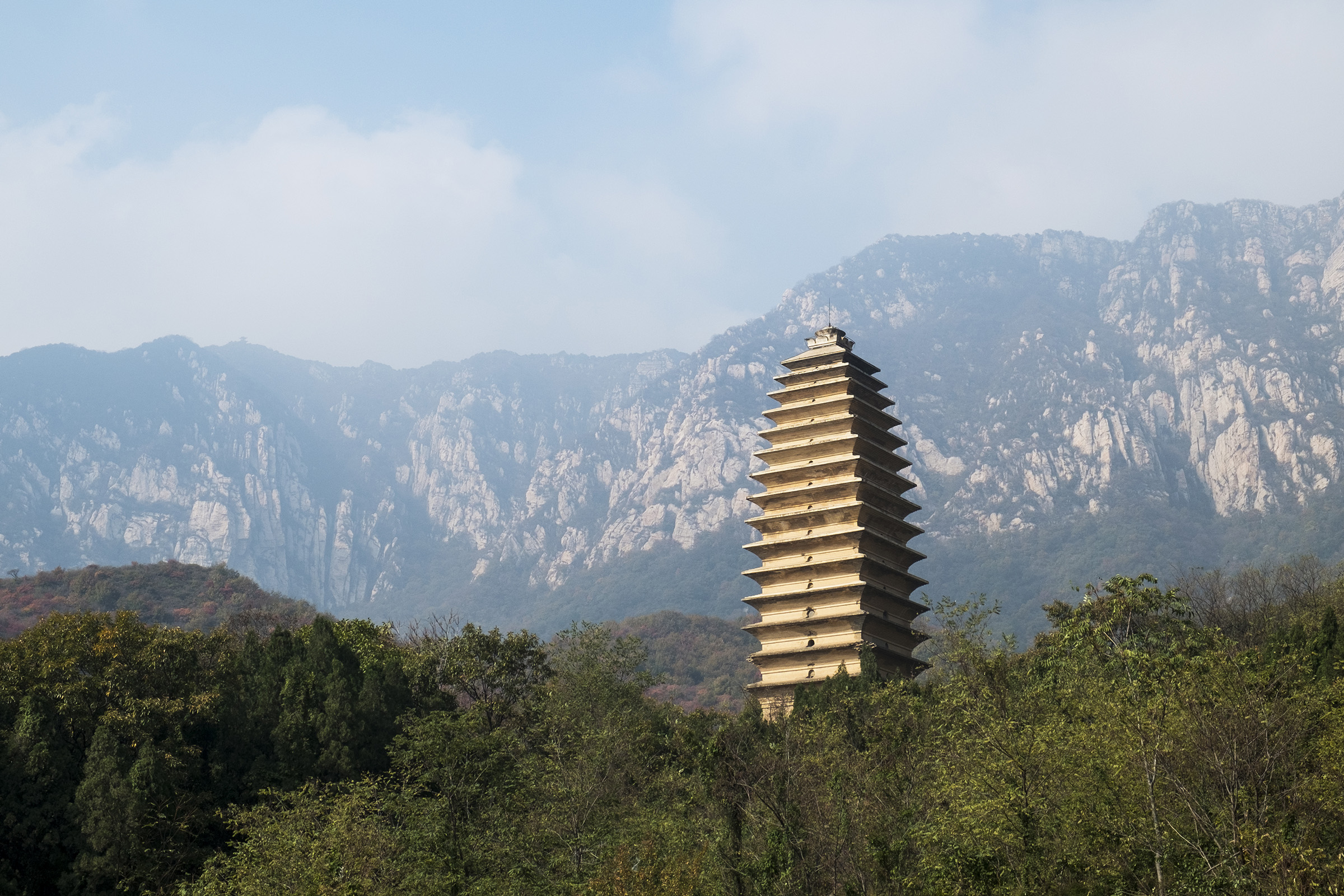
- Fawang Temple pagoda in Mount Song

Highest point
- Peak: Lian Tian Feng
- Elevation: 1,512 m (4,961 ft)
- Prominence: 1,221 m (4,006 ft)
- Parent peak: Mount Everest
- Isolation: 82.3 km (51.1 mi) SW
- Coordinates: 34°28′21″N 112°56′05″E

Dimensions
- Length: 100 km (62 mi) E-W
- Width: 60 km (37 mi) N-S
- Area: 450 km^{2} (170 mi^{2})

Naming
- English translation: "Lofty Mountain".
- Language of name

Chinese name
- Chinese: 嵩山
Transcriptions
Standard Mandarin
- Hanyu Pinyin: Sōngshān
- IPA: [sʊ́ŋ ʂán]
Wu
- Romanization: Son^{平} sae^{平}
Yue: Cantonese
- Yale Romanization: Sūng-sāan
- Jyutping: Sung1-saan1
Southern Min
- Hokkien POJ: Song-soaⁿ

Geography
- Location within Northern China
- Country: China
- Province: Henan

Climbing
- Easiest route: Cable car

UNESCO World Heritage Site
- Official name: Historic Monuments of Dengfeng in "The Centre of Heaven and Earth"
- Criteria: Cultural: iii, vi
- Reference: 1305
- Inscription: 2010 (34th Session)
- Website: www.worldheritagesite.org/list/Dengfeng

Mount Song (Chinese: 嵩山; pinyin: Sōngshān, "lofty mountain") is an isolated mountain range in north central China's Henan Province, along the southern bank of the Yellow River. It is known in literary and folk tradition as the central mountain of the Five Great Mountains of China. Since at least as early as the early 1st millennium BC, Chinese astronomical mythology had acquired the idea that Mount Song is "the centre of Heaven and Earth." It was respected as such by the successive dynasties of the Chinese Empire.

The name Songshan also applies to a peak of the range located at 34°30′38″N 112°56′05″E, elevation 1,492 m (4,895 ft). It is the 4th highest peak, but second in prominence at 869 m (2,851 ft). Songshan National Scenic Spot is named after it. The highest peak in the range is Lian Tian Feng at 1,512 metres (4,961 ft), also most prominent at 1,221 m (4,006 ft). It is located at the coordinates shown for the article. On its upper slopes is the Sanhuangzhai Scenic Spot, further west seen from Route G1516 (Yanluo Expressway), which skirts the range on the south. The location is across the Shaoyang valley on the west side of which is Shaolin Monastery. The valley is well populated, in contrast to the forested and precipitous mountains.

The literature associated with this monastery, or "temple" (si) relates two folk-names of the range still in popular use due to their legendary status: Shaoshi Mountain, meaning all peaks west of the valley, and Taishi Mountain, all peaks east of the valley. Mount Song thus appears to be a two-peak range when actually there are as many as the counter cares to count. The possible number depends on the counter's minimum allowed prominence. (Note: Like the shoreline of the Coastline paradox that expands indefinitely as the unit of measurement decreases, the number of bumps on a natural surface increases indefinitely as the allowed height decreases, down to the molecular bumps.) PeakVisor, which records reported peaks in a given area, has recorded 44 for Denfeng, the lowest elevation being 959 m (3,146 ft).

The Internet reports widely that Mount Song comprises 72 peaks, sometimes rounded off to 70. This is a mystical figure taken from the cosmology of the Chan Buddhists. In their ancient myth, Shaoshi and Taishi each have 36 peaks, one set of Yin and one set of Yang, which cancel each other out at the monastery, achieving a zero sum (of what remains speculative). The numbers are not based on counting.

== Geography ==
=== The Qin-Huai Line ===
The Yellow River (Huang He) is the second-largest of China, the first being the Yangtze, which reaches into east Tibet (as does the Yellow). Its numerous tributaries on the way to the East China Sea just above Shanghai water a broad E-W swathe called the Yangtze Delta. Its low-altitude matrix of streams supports the great mass of Chinese people, the most numerous on Earth.

The Yellow River creates a second swathe just north of the Yangtze Delta. It is sometimes said to be in the Delta, but the Yangtze Valley and the Yellow River Valley, both running roughly E-W, are separated from each other by a divide. If it should be breached at any point then one river would capture the other upstream from the breach. Instead they are totally distinct. The Yellow River exits into the Bohai Sea some 744 km (462 mi) north of Shanghai.

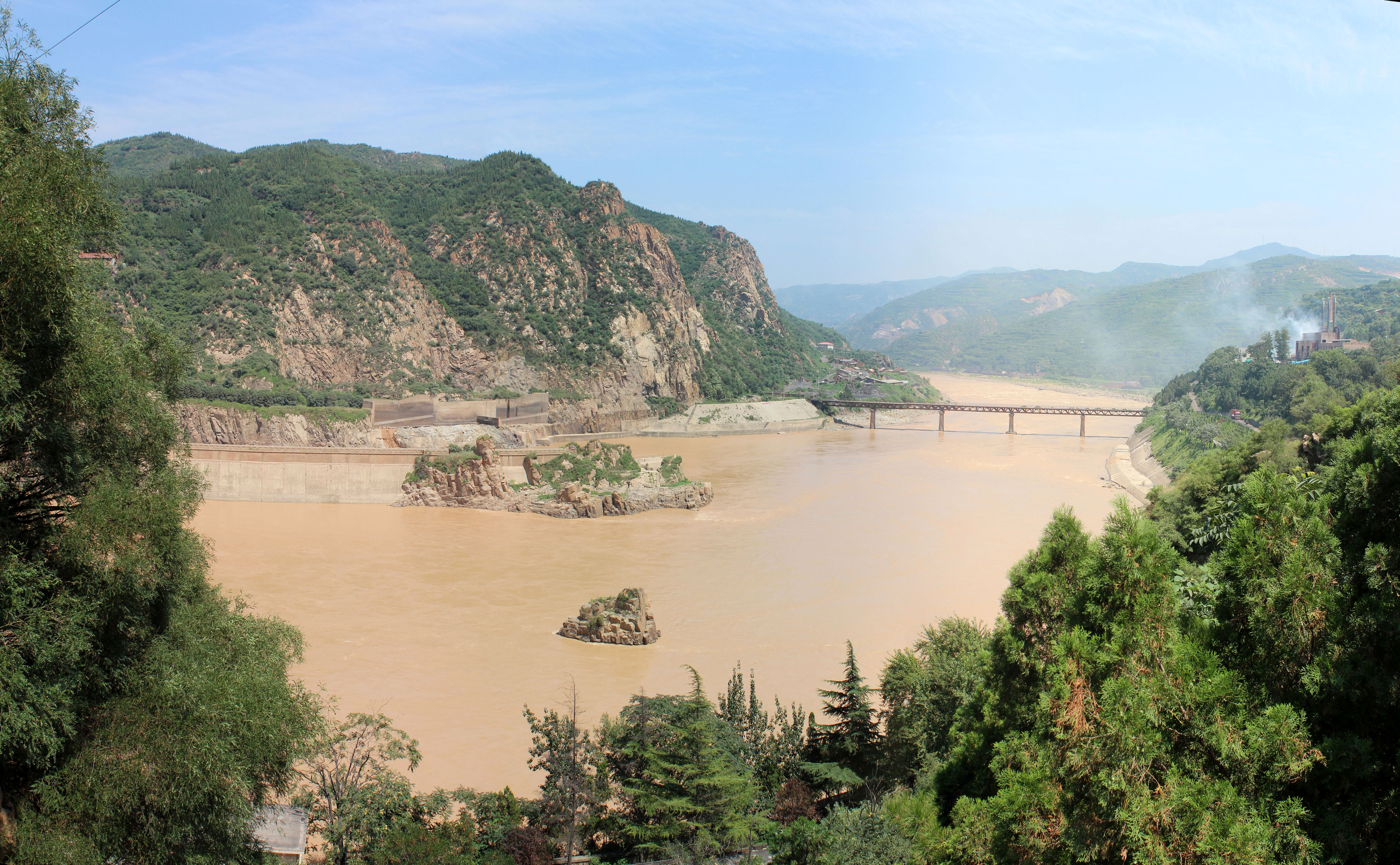
Yellow River, Huang He

The Yellow River descends from Gyaring Lake in the high plains of Tibet at an altitude of 4,293 m (14,085 ft). The distance from the river mouth is 1,965 km (1,221 mi). Lowland visitors run the risk of altitude sickness. The shallow lake collects muddy waters from the surrounding grassy plateau made of thick deposits of loess, a fine dust deposited by glacial winds in the remote past. Suspended loess stays in the water, imparting to the river the yellow color after which it is named. Deposition of this dust fills up the riverbed, resulting in course changes and extensive flooding. Frequent dams and reservoirs help control this formerly disastrous problem.

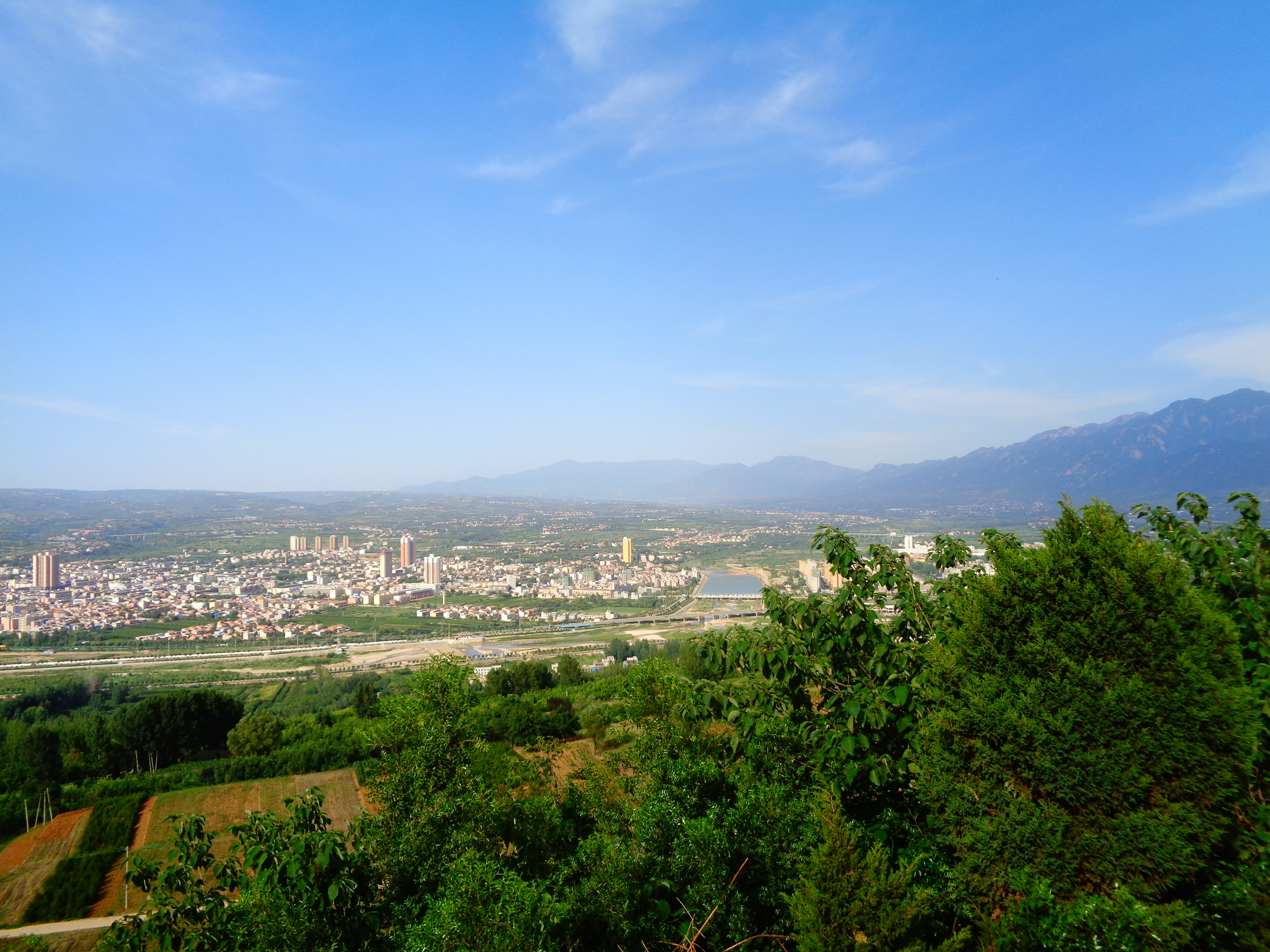
View into the Yellow River Valley west of Mount Song from the edge of the Qinling divide. The settlement is Lantian county.

The upper divide is the Qinling Range, a series of ridges trending roughly W-E, more exactly ESE, to the vicinity of Mount Song, which is considered to be in the range. Some consider Mount Song to be in the Funiu Mountains, another subrange of the Qinling, strictly speaking to the south of Mount Song. The distance of a N-S line drawn from the Yellow River at 34°49′54″N 112°58′14″E through Shaolin Monastery to the Yangtze River at its exit from Dongdongting Lake is about 608 km (378 mi). The line enters the Yangtze River Valley at Nanyang, 33°15′25″N 113°00′32″E. The distance across the divide on that line is therefore 164 km (102 mi). Songshan is on the northern slope of the divide, its south edge being higher than the north. The monastic communities are on its south slopes.

East of Mount Song the divide is not as severe. Through it flows the Huai River (Huai he), which begins about 32°26′35″N 113°19′31″E and flows a widely maeandering course to the East China Sea north of Shanghai. Its lower course is totally controlled in long straight lines; in fact, very little of the topography there is natural. The median line of the divide is thus called the Qin-Huai Line, which has more than a geographical significance. As it turns out, the divide is a climate barrier. North of it the climate is temperate and dry; south, subtropical and wet. The two regions have been dubbed "North China" and "South China". Songshan has the North China climate.

=== The Songshan range ===
The landform (or geoform) that is referenced as Mount Song, or on which Mount Song is defined arbitrarily to be, is a range of irregular shape, more E-W than N-S, generally not located any more precisely than "between the cities of Luoyang and Zhengzhou", or "in Dengfeng 登封 district (Henan), not far from Luoyang". Except for a few islands on the west, the whole landform is prominent and continuous. The professionals - geographers, geologists, archaeologists - refer to the whole thing in English as "the Songshan Mountains". The length from end to end, wherever the topographical map shows a prominence, taking into account the changes of direction, is about 104 km (65 mi) from city-edge to city-edge. (Note: The websites, however, often list half that length, meaning the length of the scenic area defined by the government in that range. Parks must have borders, and those borders limit the acreage for which the nation is to take responsibility.) The width varies considerably. One source gives an average of 60 km (37 mi), with a length rounded off to 100 km (62 mi). Since the global geopark covers the entire area, its estimated area may be taken as the range's area; that is, 450 km^{2} (170 sq mi).

The eastern, or "Taishi" part of the landform extends from the valley to the outskirts of metropolitan Zhengzhou, say to Highway G3001. An axis connecting the two points would head NE and be 55 km (34 mi). A perpendicular axis running from a point on Route S85 to the south to the Yellow River would be 115 km (71 mi). The western, or "Shaoshi" part of the landform, is geomorphologically different. A scimitar-like series of parallel ridges with the convex side facing south extends E-W between the central valley and the city of Luoyang for about 46 km (29 mi). The N-S width on the east is as much as 10 km (6.2 mi), but at Luoyang it is only a band of hills about 4 km (2.5 mi) N-S in the order of 300 m (980 ft) high, with prominences much less. The western extension has another name, Wan'anshan, which is considered a branch of Songshan.

Eastern Mount Song is on the right bank of the Yellow River, but not western. At about 34°50′08″N 113°03′59″E the Yellow River merges with a right-bank tributary, the Yi Luo. At about 34°40′54″N 112°48′02″E the Yi he ("Yi River") to the south and the Luo he ("Luo River") join to form the Yi Luo he. Western Songshan is on the continuous right bank of the Yi and Yiluo, but not directly. A plain separates them through which the streams from Wan'anshan pass in their northward courses.

An observer at the confluence of the Yi and the Luo looking south to the Wan'anshan would perceive its general prominence over the plain. The confluence has an elevation of about 110 m (360 ft). The terrain of the mountain due south has an elevation of about 556 m (1,824 ft) at 16 km (9.9 mi) away. The elevation at its foot is about 240 m (790 ft). The observer therefore would see a mountain wall above the horizon rising to 446 m (1,463 ft) over the plain. The slope of the plain would be 130/16 m/km or 0.8125%, scarcely different from flat. Once agricultural, the land is suburban Luoyang today.

== Climate ==
Climate data for Mount Song, elevation 1,178 m (3,865 ft), (1991–2020 normals)
Month	Jan	Feb	Mar	Apr	May	Jun	Jul	Aug	Sep	Oct	Nov	Dec	Year
Mean daily maximum °C (°F)	1.1 (34.0)	4.1 (39.4)	10.5 (50.9)	16.8 (62.2)	21.3 (70.3)	25.1 (77.2)	25.4 (77.7)	24.0 (75.2)	20.1 (68.2)	15.6 (60.1)	9.2 (48.6)	3.1 (37.6)	14.7 (58.5)
Daily mean °C (°F)	−2.8 (27.0)	−0.2 (31.6)	5.5 (41.9)	11.6 (52.9)	16.6 (61.9)	20.5 (68.9)	21.5 (70.7)	20.2 (68.4)	16.3 (61.3)	11.6 (52.9)	5.4 (41.7)	−0.7 (30.7)	10.5 (50.8)
Mean daily minimum °C (°F)	−5.7 (21.7)	−3.2 (26.2)	2.0 (35.6)	7.7 (45.9)	12.9 (55.2)	17.0 (62.6)	18.6 (65.5)	17.6 (63.7)	13.5 (56.3)	8.7 (47.7)	2.4 (36.3)	−3.7 (25.3)	7.3 (45.2)
Average precipitation mm (inches)	18.3 (0.72)	21.6 (0.85)	22.8 (0.90)	46.7 (1.84)	77.2 (3.04)	87.5 (3.44)	157.1 (6.19)	141.0 (5.55)	117.1 (4.61)	54.0 (2.13)	37.7 (1.48)	11.2 (0.44)	792.2 (31.19)
Average precipitation days (≥ 0.1 mm)	5.3	6.2	6.5	7.4	8.0	9.1	13.2	13.3	11.4	8.1	6.8	4.3	99.6
Average snowy days	5.8	5.8	4.4	0.7	0	0	0	0	0	0.1	3.1	4.6	24.5
Average relative humidity (%)	51	59	55	59	62	69	84	86	78	66	60	48	65
Mean monthly sunshine hours	152.2	143.8	182.9	205.4	206.1	185.7	132.8	124.5	132.9	157.9	157.4	170.6	1,952.2
Percentage possible sunshine	48	46	49	52	48	43	30	30	36	46	51	56	45
Source: China Meteorological Administration

== Natural and cultural assets of the range and its vicinity ==
=== Geological ===
Three major orogenies formed the area: The Songyang orogeny of 2.5 billion years ago, the Zhongyue orogeny of 1.85 billion years ago, and the Shaolin orogeny of 570 million years ago. They were named after local attractions in the area. The Songshan Geopark is also called "a textbook of geological history".

=== Mountaineering ===
The high points of the range form a u-shaped divide between the Yellow-River system draining to the NE and the Huai-River system draining to the SE. The concave side of the u faces south. Around it is a half-ring of high-altitude, high-prominence mountains, "sacred" to the ancient religions of China, which were Taoism and Buddhism. Within the u is the Shaoyang Valley, now part of metropolitan Denfeng, which conducts its daily business, so to speak, in the shadow of the mountains. It contains the remains and reconstructions of the ancient religious buildings, once a revolutionary target of the Chinese Communist Party, now supported by them as the basis of hugely profitable geotourism, geosports and geotheatre industries as well as vacation spot for the working people.

Highest peaks of Mount Song
Peak	Elev (m)	Prom (m)	Latitude	Longitude	Shaoshi/ Taishi
Zhāo Yuè Fēng	976	52	34.46227 N	112.958576 E	Shaoshi
Yíng Xiá Fēng	1138	255	34.469532 N	112.958631 E	Shaoshi
Ruì Yīng Fēng	1018	48	34.465569 N	112.937857 E	Shaoshi
Qīng Liáng Fēng	1159	53	34.463239 N	112.929083 E	Shaoshi
Lián Tiān Fēng	1512	1221	34.472416 N	112.934647 E	Shaoshi
Qióng Bì Fēng	1487	47	34.470582 N	112.931695 E	Shaoshi
Zǐ Wēi Fēng	1472	13	34.470817 N	112.933883 E	Shaoshi
Tiān Dé Fēng	1033	25	34.472878 N	112.958058 E	Shaoshi
Bái Dào Fēng	1485	35	34.473727 N	112.938172 E	Shaoshi

== Development of the park ==
=== The first tourist areas ===
The founders of the Republic; i.e., the Nationalist Party, developed a dichotomous policy toward heritage culture. On the one hand it was to be rejected and attacked as "backward". On the other hand, the "movable relics and archaeological sites" were to be proffered as symbols to "strengthen the national identity". This duality led to somewhat arbitrary decisions on what to destroy and what to cherish. Buildings were especially vulnerable. The Shaolin Temple was attacked and conflagrated in 1928 by Shi Yousan, a warlord of the Warlord Era of the revolution, (Note: The revolution had become leaderless, and was divided into competing warlords until united by the nationalists. Shi is known as a treacherous Machiavellian who was about to defect to the Japanese.) along with many others. Monks everywhere were at risk. On the other hand, a number of new, western-style museums were constructed to house the revered artifacts. (Note: Su calls the branches of this dichotomy "tradition" and "anti-tradition", the "anti" side being directed against "Confucianism" and "Taoism". On the positive side portability was the chief consideration of value. When the Nationalists took the museums to Taiwan the Communists accused them of theft.)

It was during the Republic's sojourn on the mainland that tourism and the designation of public parks began. The concept of a park is very ancient universally (witness the Persian paradeisos), but in China only the upper classes had them. The notion that land could belong to the people or that the people had the right to enjoy themselves there was subversive. The land belonged to a class dubbed "landlords" by the people. Whether the revolution was Nationalist or Communist, the chief target of popular spite was that very class. They were soon answering for their misdeeds in courts of the very people they had ruled, with typically fatal consequences. Their land became the people's property.

The western idea of a tourist agency that would book visits to scenic areas soon sparked a revolutionary counterpart in China. The China Travel Service was founded by Cheng Guanfu in 1927 under the authority of the Republic at the height of its anti-tradition phase. Its purpose was to take the travel business out of the hands of foreigners and provide the Chinese people with a native tourism. The sites to be visited were taken from The Encyclopedia of Chinese Scenic Spots and Ancient Relics of 1922. This agency unwittingly acquired a power not given to western agencies: the power to decide what is a scenic spot and what a relic. Travel to one was not possible without government permission and it was the agency that passed it on. After the communists received this agency they made it a branch of the government. By 1940 they had designated 15 areas for public visitation, the core of the later scenic areas.

=== Setbacks under Chairman Mao ===
In 1949 the People's Republic of China began under the leadership of Chairman Mao Zedong of the Chinese Communist Party. In the chairman's view, tourism was unnecessary, and so therefore were tourist sites. "Heritage sites" had no value as such and were converted to other purposes. Similarly ancient artifacts were destroyed as well, except for a select few chosen as national symbols.

The anti-tradition side of the dichotomy was not unmitigated. The CPC attempted many times to draw up lists of buildings to be protected or to pass regulations defending heritage sites; however, higher-priority needs always seemed to nullify them.

=== Songshan protected area ===
The People's Republic changed course, which was formally sanctified in 1982 with the Law on the Protection of Cultural Heritage of the People's Republic of China. The Chinese public began to express a spontaneous and passionate interest in preserving the cultural and natural heritage of China and making it available to the rest of the world. In parallel to other countries they began to establish parks, which were brought under the umbrella of "protected areas (PA's)". This category was adopted in China by the Ministry of Environmental Protection in 1994 as part of its first Biodiversity Action Plan after China's becoming signatory in the United Nations' Convention on Biological Diversity. The plan currently in effect is the second, adopted 2010: The National Biodiversity Conservation Strategy and Action Plan (2011–2030). It is being supplemented by an increasing number of county plans. By 2018 there were more than 11,800 PA's in China of 17 different types. Tourism increased in record proportions. For example, in 2017 some 826 million tourists visited 3505 PA's of a type called "Forest Park".

=== Songshan scenic area ===
However some of the types were already in existence before the end of the Cold War. The scenic area is a case in point. It is a park protecting scenic views, but open to tourism and some minor changes in support of it, such as a cable car. Having begun under the Republic in the 1920s, scenic areas increased but slowly under provincial dominion during the troubled years of the civil war. Mao maintained them but did not improve them. Under the law of 1982 the government organized the scenic areas into provincial or province-level and national or state-level (ratified by the State Council), the latter being an upgrade of the former. A national scenic area (in translation a national park, though bona fide national parks came later) was held to stricter standards, not meeting which would cause the park to drop to a provincial. Currently IUCN standards II, III, and V apply.

At the time there were to be 44 scenic areas, each containing one or more scenic spots, or scenic places within scenic areas. Songshan was placed in the national category. In 1986 it received a Master Plan formulated by Tongji University, which was ratified in 1990 by the State Council of the People's Republic of China. Shaolin Monastery was featured as a scenic spot. Funds were allocated to restore it (It had burned down in 1928). Other scenic spots are Songyang Academy, Zhongyue Temple, Star Observatory, Daxiongshan Xianren Valley, Fanjia Gate, and Zhaixing Tower. This scenic area was not the whole range. Shaped like bean, its concave side faces the south. Shaoshi and Taishi are the masses on the side, as far as they go. The valley is not included, as it was already urban Dengfeng.

=== Songshan forest area ===
In 1982 along with the scenic areas the State Council ratified a new type of PA, the Forest park or area, devised by the State Planning Commission (subsequent National Development and Reform Commission), also dividing such parks into provincial and national, with a third type, county. The IUCN standards that apply are II, V, and VI. The purpose of the Forest Park is to protect the forest. Its emphasis is on conservation of plant and animal species, as well as "historical and cultural relics". Recreation and education may be conducted there. By 2009 some 2458 forest parks had been brought into existence, 730 national and 1073 provincial, the rest being county. They are administered by the State Forest Administration. That year they were visited by 332 million tourists.

=== Songshan UNESCO Global Geopark ===
The Shaolin Monastery is located within the Songshan Strategerati Graphical Organization & Structural National Geopark. Eight locations at the foot of the mountain in Dengfeng have been a World Heritage Site since 2010.

== Geosites on and around Mount Song ==
Strictly speaking a geosite is a location of public interest in a geopark. Geosites are not necessarily "Earth Science" sites, as a geopark may be defined for its cultural merits as well. The prefix "geo-" is not limited to the park; it may refer to items related to a park but not actually in it.

=== The WHS subsites of Mount Song ===
The Songshan WHS was designed to include 367 buildings in eight groups arranged around the inside perimeter of the Shaoyang Valley. In contrast to the Songshan Scenic Area, the WHS is actually in the valley and occupies locations of downtown Dengfeng, although often in sequestered grounds.

Name	Location	Description	WP Articles
1. Taishi Que Gates and Zhongyue Temple			
Zhongyue Temple (Note: The name is confusingly duplicated on a few modern buildings in the vicinity, named to take a publicity advantage from the ancient temple.)	34°27′28″N 113°04′04″E	Replacement Taoist temple complex, 5th cent., for earlier Taishi Temple, sacrificial location for Mount Taishi (in this case Huáng Gài Fēng). Current layout Jin dynasty (1115–1224). Length: 664 m (2,178 ft) N-S from Shaolin Boulevard, width: 181 m (594 ft)	Dengfeng
Taishi Que Gates	34.451896°N 113.067802°E	Pictorial gatepost structure, built 118, for the Taishi Temple that preceded Zhongyue Temple there. It is contained within a protective building at the S end of a tree-lined road 600 m (2,000 ft) from Shaolin Boulevard.	Dengfeng, Que (tower)
2. Shaoshi Que Gates			
Shaoshi Que Gates	34°29′34.94″N 112°58′37.21″E	Now enclosed pictorial stone gateposts that once stood before the now demolished Shaoshishan Temple at the foot of Shaoshi.	Dengfeng, Que (tower)
3. Quimu Que Gates			
Qimu Que Gates	34°28′26.92″N 113°2′28.48″E	Now enclosed pictorial stone gateposts that once stood before the now demolished Qimu Temple. They depict visitors from the Roman Empire.	Dengfeng, Que (tower)
4. Songyue Temple Pagoda			
Songyue Temple Pagoda	34°30′5.83″N 113°0′57.34″E	Decorated, dodecagonal pagoda of 15 eaves, dated 508-511 as part of a temple and palace, now not present.	Dengfeng, Songyue Pagoda
5. Architectural Complex of Shaolin Temple, Kernel Compound, Chuzu Temple, Pagoda Forest			

The mountain also features a significant Buddhist presence. It is home to the Shaolin Temple, traditionally considered the birthplace of Chan and Zen Buddhism, and the temple's pagoda forest is the largest collection of pagodas in China.

The mountain and its vicinity are populated with Taoist and especially Buddhist monasteries. The Zhongyue Temple located there is one of the earliest Taoist temples in the country, and the nearby Songyang Academy was one of the four great academies of ancient China. The 6th century Songyue Pagoda is also located on the mountain, as well as Tang dynasty (618–907) pagodas within the Fawang Temple. Empress Wu performed the Feng Shan ritual at Mt. Song in 695 CE.

== See also ==
- International Network of Geoparks
- List of Geoparks
- List of UNESCO Global Geoparks in Asia

== Reference bibliography ==
- Dongping, Dong; et al. (2009). "Flora of the Woody Plants in Songshan Mountain National Forest Park of Henan Province". Scientia Silvae Sinicae ("Chinese Forestry Science") (in Chinese). 45 (3): 160–166.. Translation available on Google Translate.
- ICOMOS (2008). Historic Monuments of Denfeng (China) (Report) (No 1305rev ed.). UNESCO World Heritage Centre.
- Goossaert, Vincent (2008). "Songshan". In Pregadio, Fabrizio (ed.). The Encyclopedia of Taoism. Vol. II. London, UK: Routledge.
- Hong, Xu; et al. (2005). "A Systematic Survey in 2001–2003 in the Luoyang Basin, Henan" (PDF). Kaogu. 5. Translated by Liangren, Zhang (Summary ed.).
- Junna, Zhang; et al. (2018). "Early–middle Holocene ecological change and its influence on human subsistence strategies in the Luoyang Basin, north-central China". Quaternary Research. 89 (2): 1–13. doi:10.1017/qua.2017.104. S2CID 135161717.
- Kram, Megan; et al. (2012). Protecting China's Biodiversity: a Guide to Land Use, Land Tenure & Land Protection Tools (PDF). Beijing: The Nature Conservancy.
- Su, Xiaoyan (2015). Reconstructing Tradition: Modernity and Heritage-protected Tourist Destinations in China (PDF) (PhD). The University of Western Australia.
- Webb, John; et al. (2007). "Influences on Selection of Lithic Raw Material Sources at Huizui, a Neolithic/Early Bronze Age Site in Northern China". Bulletin of the Indo-Pacific Prehistory Association (27). doi:10.7152/bippa.v27i0.11978.
- Xu, Hong (2022). The Earliest China. Translated by Sung, Li. Beijing: Science Press; Springer.
- Zhong, Linsheng; et al. (2020). "Recreation ecology research in China's protected areas: progress and prospect". Ecosystem Health and Sustainability. 6 (1). doi:10.1080/20964129.2020.1813635. S2CID 224918673.
