= Honggeertu volcanic field =

Volcanic field in China

Coordinates: 41.47°N 113°E

Honggeertu is a volcanic field in China, in Inner Mongolia.

The field is formed by twelve basaltic cinder cones. Some of the cones formed on a fault. It may be of Holocene age. Young lava flows from this field look much younger than these of Quaternary volcanoes in the neighbourhood. The volcanism may originate in the tectonic effects of the movement of the Ordos Block. Seismic tomography indicates the presence of a low velocity region at the volcano.

== See also ==
- List of volcanic fields
