= Pechan =

Pechan is a surname. Notable people with the surname include:

- Albert Pechan (1902–1969), American politician
- Karel Pechan (1901–?), Czech cyclist
