= Jingpo Lake =

Lake in Heilongjiang, China

Lake Jingpo
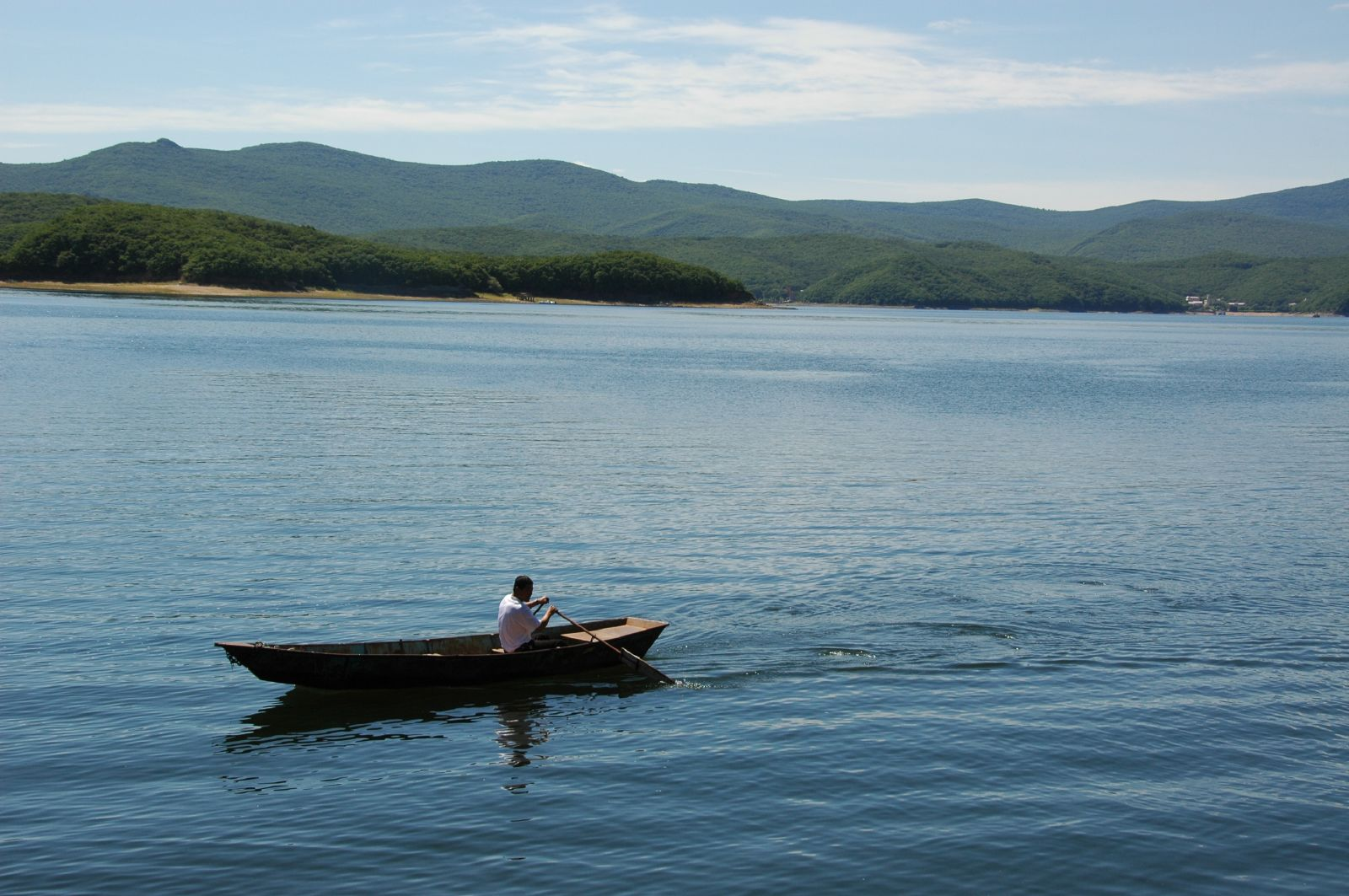

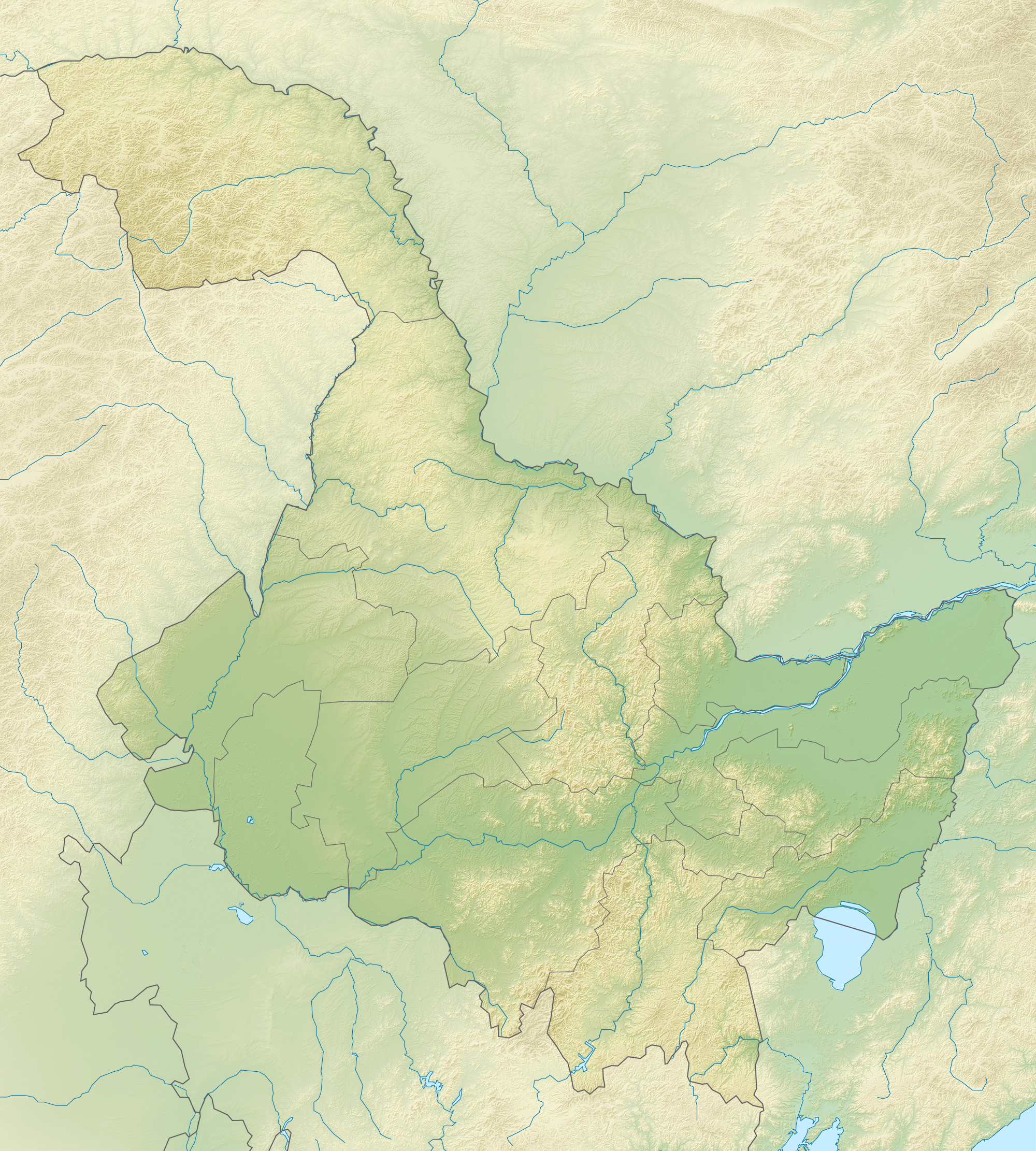
- Location within Heilongjiang
- Location: Ningan County, Heilongjiang
- Coordinates: 43°52′48″N 128°56′24″E
- Basin countries: China
- Max. length: 45 km (28 mi)
- Max. width: 6 km (3.7 mi)
- Surface area: 95 km^{2} (37 sq mi)
- Max. depth: 62 m (203 ft)

Jingpo Lake
- Traditional Chinese: 鏡泊湖
- Simplified Chinese: 镜泊湖
- Literal meaning: "Mirror Lake"
Transcriptions
Standard Mandarin
- Hanyu Pinyin: Jìng Pōhú
- Wade–Giles: Ching⁴ Pʻo¹-hu²
- IPA: t͡ɕiŋ⁵¹ pʰu̯ɔ⁵⁵xu³⁵

Jingpo Lake or Lake Jingpo (Note: Sometimes mistakenly romanized as Lake Jingbo or Jingbo Lake owing to an unrelated alternate pronunciation of the second character. The name itself is something of a misnomer, as the pō ("lake") properly modifies hú and not jìng.) (Chinese: 镜泊湖; Pinyin: Jìng Pō Hú) is a lake located in the upper reaches of the Mudan River among the Wanda Mountains in Ningan County, Heilongjiang Province, in the People's Republic of China. Earlier names for the lake include Meituohu Lake (湄沱湖), Huhanhai Lake (忽汗海), and Bilten Lake (Manchurian: ᠪᡳᠯᡨᡝᠨ; Chinese: 畢爾騰湖).

The length of the lake from north to south is 45 kilometers (28 mi) and the widest distance between east and west is only 6 kilometers (3.7 mi). The area is 95 km^{2} (37 sq mi) and the storage capacity is 1.63 billion cubic metres (2.13 billion cubic yards). The south part of lake is shallow with the deepest place in the northern part at 62 meters (203 ft).

The winter average temperature in Heilongjiang Province is below -20°C (-4°F), but the temperature at the bottom of the water is always above 10°C (50°F).

On Titan, the largest moon of the planet Saturn, there is a large surface body of liquid hydrocarbons, Jingpo Lacus, named after Jingpo Lake.

== Formation ==
The lake was created about 10,000 years ago when the lava of volcanic eruptions in the region blocked the flow of the Mudan River. Jingpo Lake has experienced five volcanic eruptions. It is the largest alpine lava barrier lake in China.

== Gallery ==
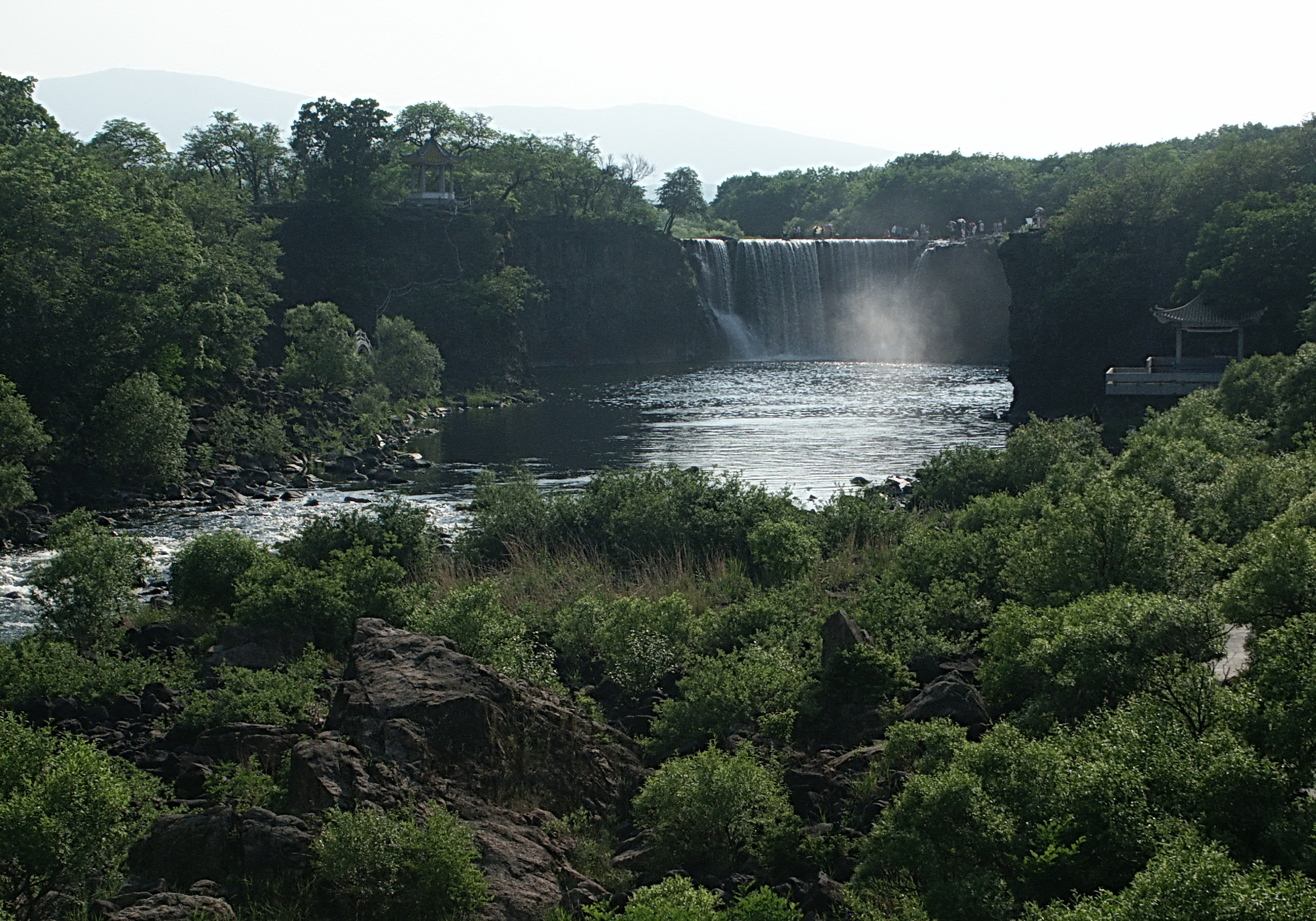
Diaoshuilou Waterfall in the summer (13 June 2010)

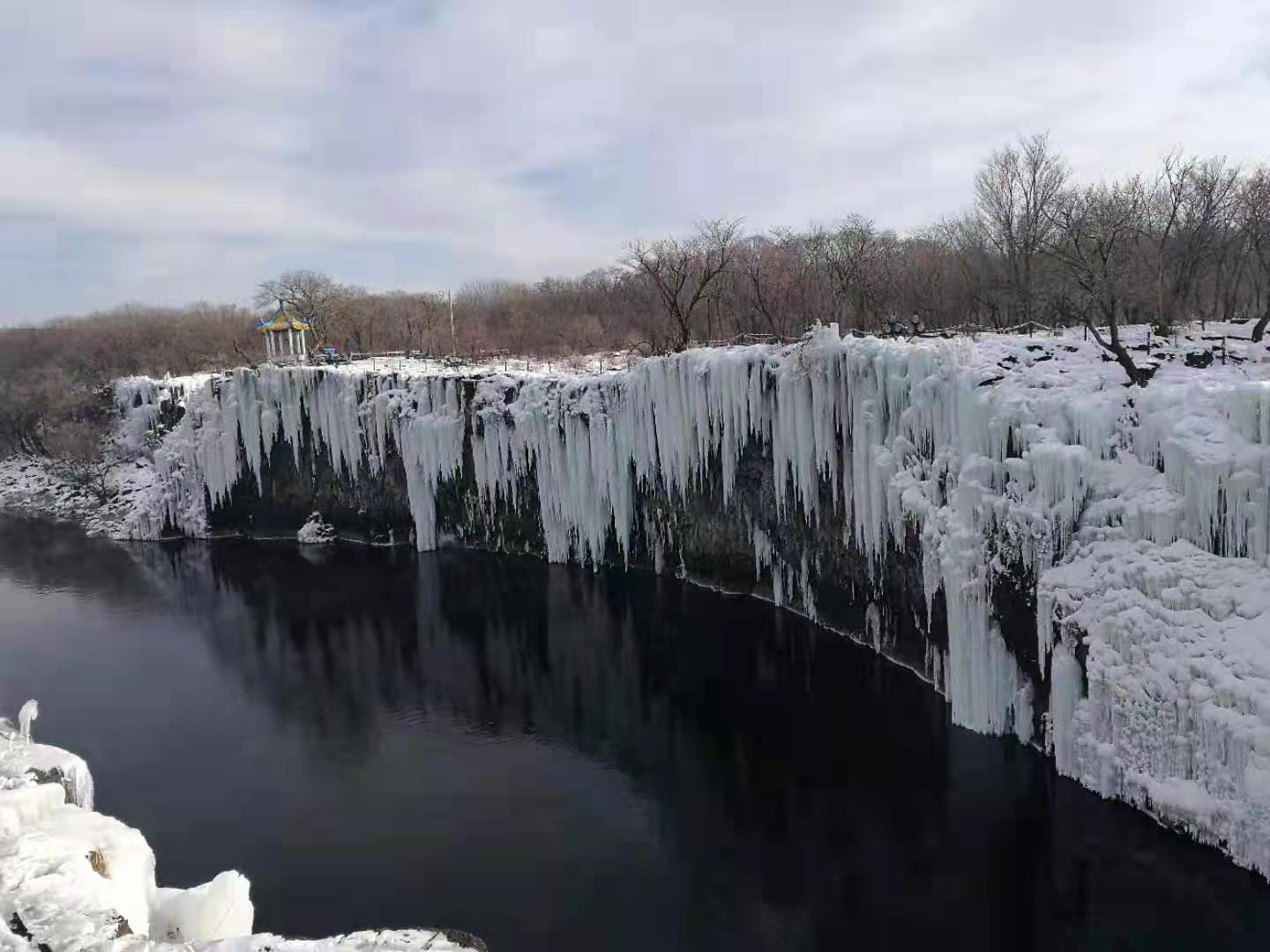
Diaoshuilou Waterfall at Jingpo Lake during winter

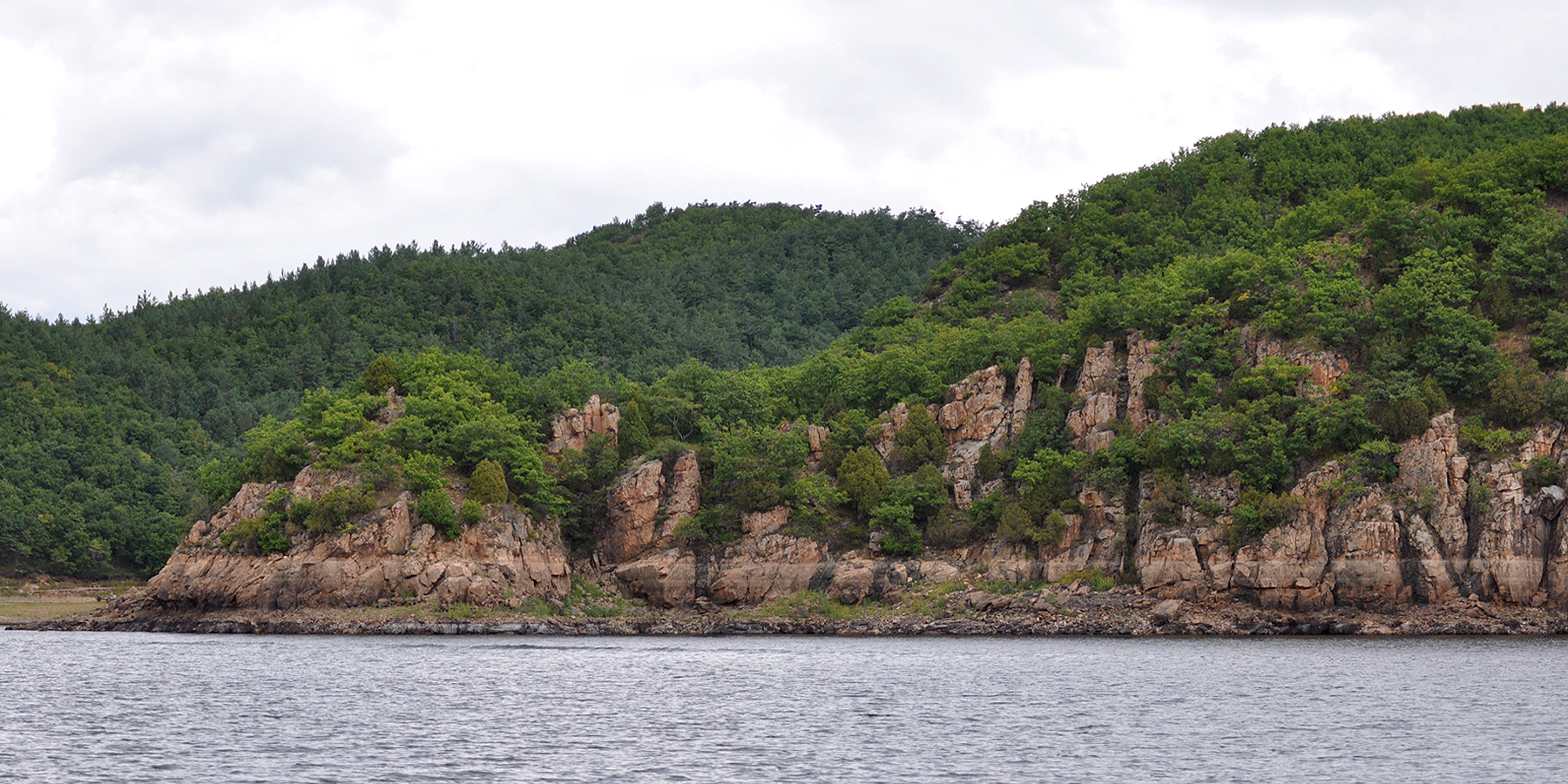
Jingpohu Lake, Jingpohu Global Geopark, Heilongjiang, China (10 September 2014)

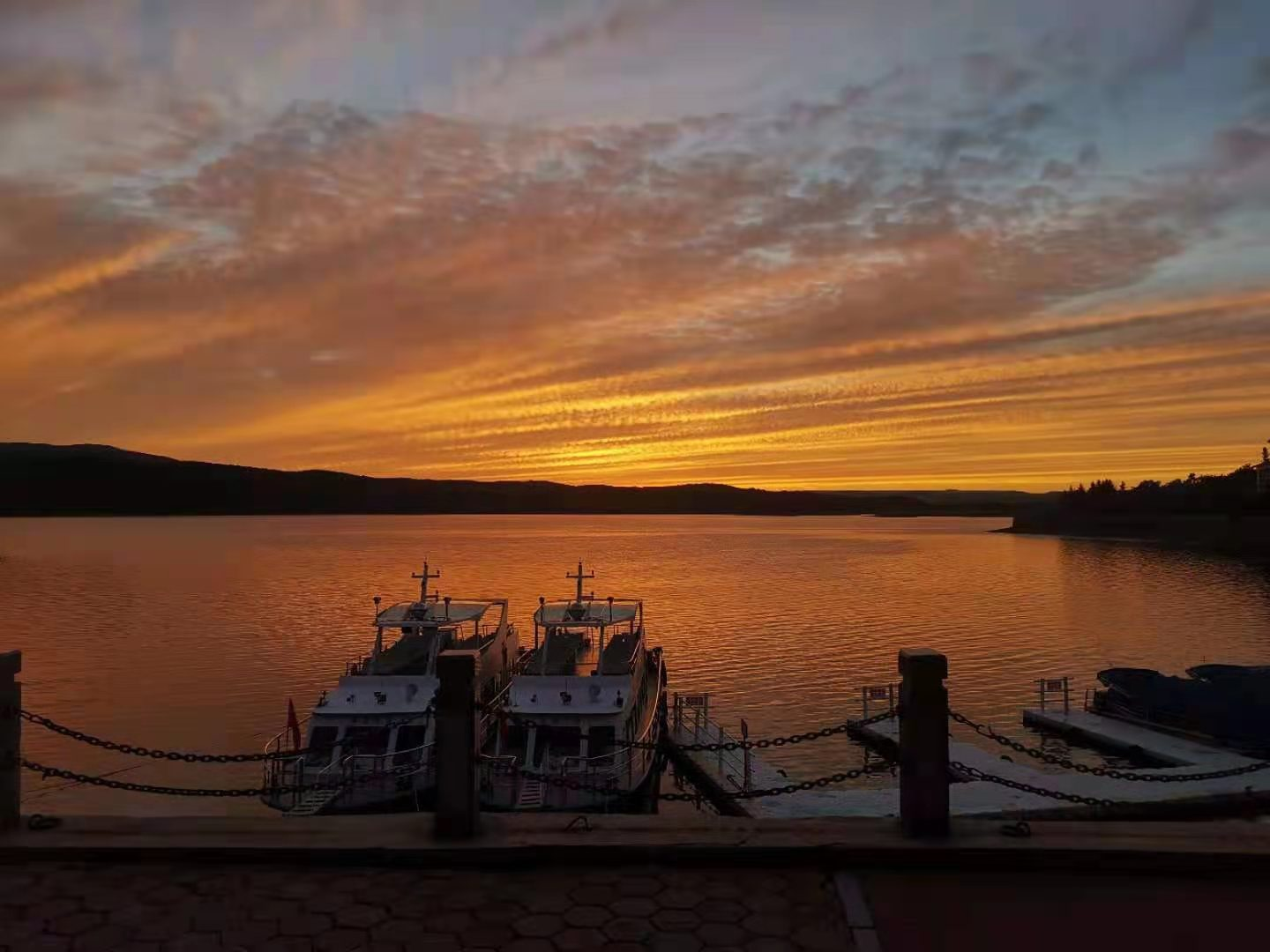
Sunset on Jingpo Lake

== See also ==
- List of volcanoes in China
