= Wudalianchi volcanic field =

Volcanic field in Heilongjiang, China

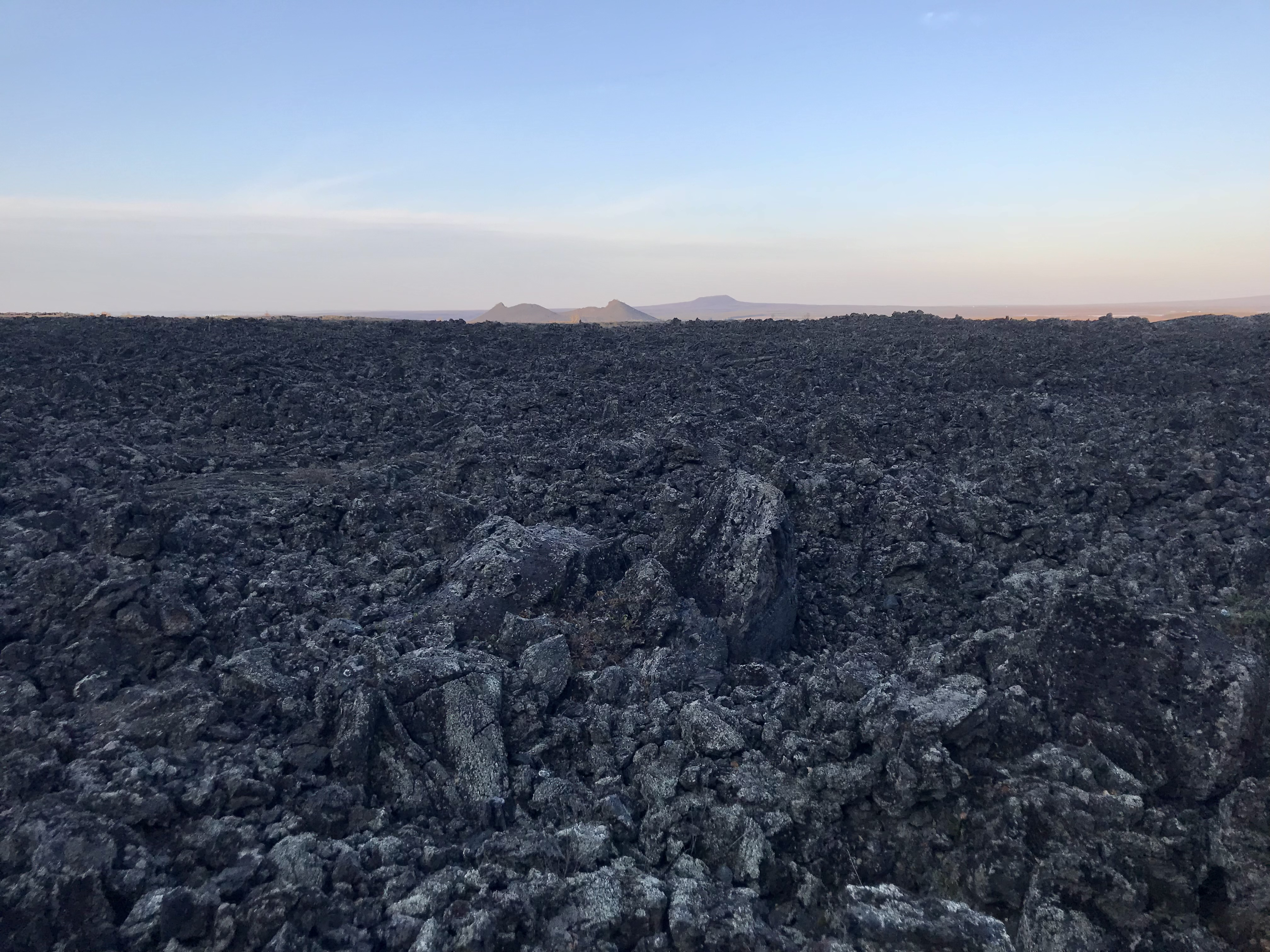
- Lava flows and cinder cones in the background

Highest point
- Elevation: 596.9 m (1,958 ft)
- Coordinates: 48°43′19″N 126°09′00″E

Geography
- Countries: Heilongjiang, China

Geology
- Mountain type: Volcanic field
- Last eruption: 1776

The Wudalianchi volcanic field is a monogenetic volcanic field located in Heilongjiang, China. It comprises 14 cinder cones. The last eruption associated with the field occurred in the 17th century. The Wudalianchi volcanic field covers a 500 km^{2} (190 sq mi) area with a lava plateau and cinder cones.

== Origins ==
The source of volcanism in the region is thought to be a deep mantle plume, similar to that observed in Hawaii. Though, it may also instead be a product of subduction volcanism associated with subduction of the Pacific Plate before the Sea of Japan formed. The Moho boundary beneath the volcanic field lies at 34.5–35 km (21.4–21.7 mi) depth which is shallower than the surrounding region of 35–45 km (22–28 mi). This indicates the field is located in a mantle swell area. Major faults trending northeast and northwest intersect the volcanic field. Most of the volcanic cones follow a northeast trend, suggesting that these faults serve a possible route for magma to travel towards the surface.

== Geology ==
Fourteen volcanic centers dating to the Early Pleistocene have been identified. These are cinder cones that have ejected mainly tephra. The highest cone, Nangelaqiushan, measured 596.9 m (1,958 ft) in elevation.

The Molabushan, Xilongmenshan, Donglongmenshan, Wohushan, Yaoquanshan, Xijiaobushan, and Xiaogushan cones formed during the Quaternary age. Lava flows in the area is abundant. The Xilongmenshan and Donglongmenshan cones were also active during the Holocene.

A recent eruptive phase involved the Laoheishan and Huoshhaoshan cones in the 18th century. It occurred between 14 January 1720 and 26 April 1721. Within a span of eight months, the eruption produced 1 billion cubic meters of lava and 150 million cubic meters of tephra. This eruption also produced cinder cones. The lava associated with the Laoheishan and Huoshhaoshan cones were pahoehoe and aa types that occurred for 65 km^{2} (25 sq mi).

== Eruptions ==
Earthquake swarms were observed in the three months prior to the beginning of the 14 January 1720 eruption. This eruption constructed a cinder cone, Laoheishan, in place of another that formed 100 thousand years ago. The eruption was explosive and followed by lava flows. The lava flows continued even after the eruption's explosive stage ceased. After eight months of quiescence, an earthquake swarm occurred for two weeks. Eruptions resumed on Laoheishan, and at another location some 2.5 km (1.6 mi) to its northeast, eventually forming Huoshaoshan.

Local officials also noted another eruption with the Laoheishan cone in 1776. It was an explosive eruption that also produced tephra. This eruption produced lava flows that overlapped that of the 1720 eruption and tephra covered a region to its southeast.

The volcanic field is considered active. Future eruptions would produce ash and lava flows that pose a hazard to the highly populated surrounding area.

== See also ==
- List of volcanoes in China
- List of volcanic fields
