= Thomas Olip =

Slovene resistance activist

Thomas Olip Tomaž Olip
- Born: 17 December 1913; Zell/Sele, Carinthia, Austro-Hungarian empire
- Died: 29 April 1943; Execution facility, District Court complex, Vienna, Reichsgau Wien, Germany
- Occupation(s): Forrester; Resistance activism
- Known for: his execution by guillotine and the circumstances leading up to it
- Mother: Maria

Thomas Olip (17 December 1913 - 29 April 1943) was a Slovene resistance activist against National Socialism in Carinthia. He was captured on 1 December 1942, together with his diary. He faced Nazi justice at Klagenfurt on 12 April 1943 and was executed by guillotine at Vienna on 29 April 1943. His diary, which survived, became one of the most important source documents on the (otherwise sparsely recorded) anti-government resistance in the frontier lands between south-east Austria (between 1938 and 1945 part of Germany) and the northern part of Jugoslavia.

== Life ==
Thomas Olip was born less than a year before the outbreak of the First World War, at Zell/Sele, a small town on the frontier between Austria and Slovenia. The village itself was overwhelmingly Slovene speaking, but in the interpretation placed on the 1920 plebiscite, conducted in order to determine the placing of the frontier between the newly configured states of Austria and Jugoslavia, Zell was deemed to be an integral part of the region by which, on its north side it was surrounded. Accordingly, after the war's rubble and dust had settled, Olip grew up in Austria. In common most if his immediate neighbours, his first language and ethnic identity were nevertheless Slovene. He was illegitimate, and brought up in conditions of some poverty as a Roman Catholic by his mother Maria, attending school in Zell/Sele. He is described in sources as a forestry worker or lumberjack.

However, on 1 September 1937 he volunteered for military service in the Austrian Infantry Regiment Np. 7, based in Klagenfurt. Shortly after the annexation of Austria into an enlarged version of Germany, which took place during March 1938, he was dismissed from the army on 30 April 1938. Olip is believed to have been a member of the traditionist-nationalist Fatherland Front, the Austrian Forestry Workers' Association and of the Zell-based Catholic-Slovenian Cultural Association.

On 1 September 1939 the German invasion of Poland from the west marked the start of another war. Sixteen days later the Soviet invasion of Poland from the east confirmed it, and hinted at the likely extent of the war to come, along with the evident existence of (still, for most people, completely secret) some sort of a strategic understanding between Europe's two most militarily powerful dictators. Due to border changes in March 1937, Thomas Olip's home was now inside Germany. On 15 September 1938 he had been summoned to Klagenfurt and conscripted into the "139th Mountain Infantry Regiment" ("Gebirgsjägerregiment 139"). A year later, on 19 September 1939, he turned up across the border in Jugoslavia, still wearing the uniform of the German army, and presented himself as a deserter. He was taken to Kranj where he faced six intensive questioning sessions by Jugoslav officers, keen to know every available detail on the military strength of the army garrison at Klagenfurt. During March/April Jugoslavia was invaded from the north, and on 20 April 1941 Thomas Olip crossed back over the mountains that had hitherto separated Jugoslavia from occupied Austria. The date was memorable as Adolf Hitler's fifty-second birthday. Another important date followed six days later. 27 April 1941 marked the foundation of the Osvobodilna Liberation Front.

== Slovene resistance ==
Initially he lived in the forests, together with fellow resistance activists Jakob Oraže and Josef Malle. Another of the activists, Franz Pristovnik ensured that they were properly fed from his father's farm. Olip may have been among the Slovene partisans who found shelter in a barn on the Pristovniks' farm during the coldest nights. Later during 1941 he moved on to the hamlet of Ebriach where he based himself, with others, close to the farm estate of his cousin, another Thomas Olip (1883-1943). He persuaded his cousin, Maria Olip, to fetch him food. Towards the end of 1941 Pristovnik negotiated an association between Thomas Olip and the brothers Johann, Peter and Valentin Olip with another army deserter, Johann Gruden. Thomas Olip and Jakob Orasche both spent the winter of 1941/42 in an outbuilding on the Pristovnik family farm. They were considered to be members of the so-called "green cadres". These were Slovene resistance fighters actively engaged in southern Carinthia who did not wish to become members of the Osvobodilna Liberation Front because of its close links to the Communist Party. It is nevertheless clear that in terms of the shared objective of antifascist resistance, the Osvobodilna Front and the green cadres worked closely together.

As Spring returned, during the first part of 1942 Thomas Olip and Jakob Orasche constructed a first bunker in the Setitsche Hill, near the Pristovniks' farm buildings. Pristovnik provided the necessary digging tools. In June 1942 they constructed a second bunker in a ravine above the Hlipoutschnik sawmill. They lived in it briefly. The bunkers became meeting points for the partisan fighters.

During July 1942 Olip received a visitor at the Hlipoutschnik, Ivan Županc, who had come from the partisan camp at Strachwitz. Županc delivered an order from the partisan leader Crtov that Olip should come and meet him at the partisan camp. Olip made his way to meet the leader with a comrade called Max Kelich, only to be sent away with an order to come back the next day bringing four other "green cadre" fighters who were hiding out at the bunker at this time. After long discussion, however, Olip and Kelich agreed together that they would prefer to remain in their "green cadre" bunker, independent of the main communist-dominated partisan band. Olip confided to his diary that he felt "very happy" with this outcome.

There was nevertheless further cooperation with Županc. Fourteen days later they collaborated on weapons procurement when Thomas Olip made a visit to Ferlach to meet up with the gunsmith Johann Doujak, whom he had already met while game poaching at Javornik, and from whom he had indeed already acquired a poaching rifle. As a result of Olip's visit to Ferlach he was soon able to take delivery, in the company of his "green cadre" comrades Max Kelich and Jakob Orasche, take delivery of a substantial quantity of weaponry, including a rifle and ammunition, at location that in peace time would have been considered implausible, 1,600 meters up the Matzenberg (mountain). A share of the delivery was handed over to the Županc partisan group.

Županc made another visit to the bunker on 12 August 1942 in order to build up a little force for another operation. However, Olip was the only member of the "green cadre" who went with Županc. They went together to Ebriach where several partisans awaited them, including Peter Blazic from Slovenia. Županc told Olip and then others about a man identified "Hunter Urbas" who must be killed, on the grounds that back in 1935 he had shot two Slovenes who had been making their way back from Ferlach. It appears that Olip was able to show the partisans where they might find "Hunter Urbas" and was present on 14 August 1942 when "Hunter Urbas" was shot by partisans while trying to run away from them. Olip remained in touch with the partisans, who were able to make use of his very detailed knowledge of the local topography. In or before October 1942 the communist Stane Mrhar, visited the partisans group under the command of Županc on behalf of the Osvobodilna Liberation Front (OF). In a lengthy report dated 4 October 1942, and addressed to the OF leadership on the group's links with the "green cadre" on the locality, Mrhar noted that only "Tomo" (Thomas Olip) and Max Kelich were "in contention". He also referenced "Jaka" (Jakob Orasche) as suffering from "reduced mobility". From Mrhar's report it is clear that Thomas Olip was known to the Županc partisans and that they would have liked him to join up with them. He never did, however.

== Discovery and arrest ==
After they had crushed the Eisenkappel partisan group the security services turned their attention to resistance operations in the adjacent Zell locality. Their starting point was a letter from Županc which they had intercepted and the capture, during November 1942, of Maria Olip who was Županc's sister. They then appeared at Olip's bunker, accompanied by Peter Blazic whom they had captured and who was badly injured, on 1 December 1942. Thomas Olip and Jakob Orasche were taken prisoner and a thorough search was made of the bunker. Resistance activists tended to avoid writing down more than was strictly necessary, but Thomas Olip had nevertheless kept a diary which the men arresting them found. Critically, it contained details enabling the security services to identify unambiguously people who had supported or fought alongside resistance partisans. For twelve of them, Olip's diary would represent a death sentence. After the justice processes had run their course Thomas Olip would also be among those sentenced to death, meaning that the total number of executions resulting from the raid on the bunker in December 1942 would be 13.

Arrest was followed by intensive interrogation, incorporating serious torture. Further arrests would follow on and after 13 January 1943: others faced similar ordeals. At their trial Franz Pristovnik would be accused of having persuaded Thomas Olip "to cross over to the bandits in Upper Carniola". Florian Kelich would be accused of having "acted as a point of contact for Thomas Olip a number of times over a succession of months. He had allowed [Olip] to spend the night in the hay with him and fed him now and again". The court was told that according to Olip's diary there had been more than thirty meetings at the home of Bartholomäus/Jernej Orasche. Johann Orasche was accused of having met up with Thomas Olip "whom he knew had deserted abroad". From Olip's diary it was also determined that Kelich had on more than one occasion not just talked to Olip, but had "gone to him several times" and been entertained to food and drink by him.

Olip's diary was scrutinised with the greatest care by the Gestapo. The Slovenian lawyer, who was in a Klagenfurt prison cell by this time, was also closely questioned over his contacts with the Olip brothers in Ljubljana.

The trial was presided over by Roland Freisler, president of the special "People's Court", which normally heard its cases in Berlin or Vienna. On this occasion, however, hearings for all 35 of the "Zell defendants" took place at Klagenfurt. The trials were brief. Verdicts were delivered on 12 April 1943. 13 of the defendants among them Thomas Olip, were sentenced to be executed.

On 29 April 1943 all thirteen of those condemned to death in the court at Klagenfurt fifteen days before were killed on the guillotine installed at the District Court complex a few years earlier. Olip's body was exhumed a few years later, in 1949, and reburied in his home village.
