= Chalybeate =

Mineral spring with water containing iron

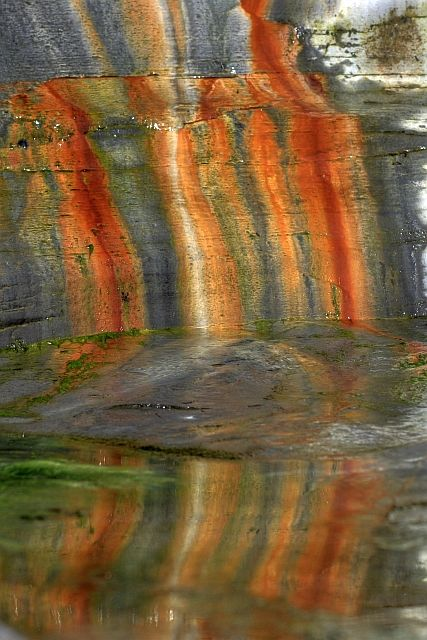
Mineral stains, Rosedale Cliffs – marks caused by chalybeate waters

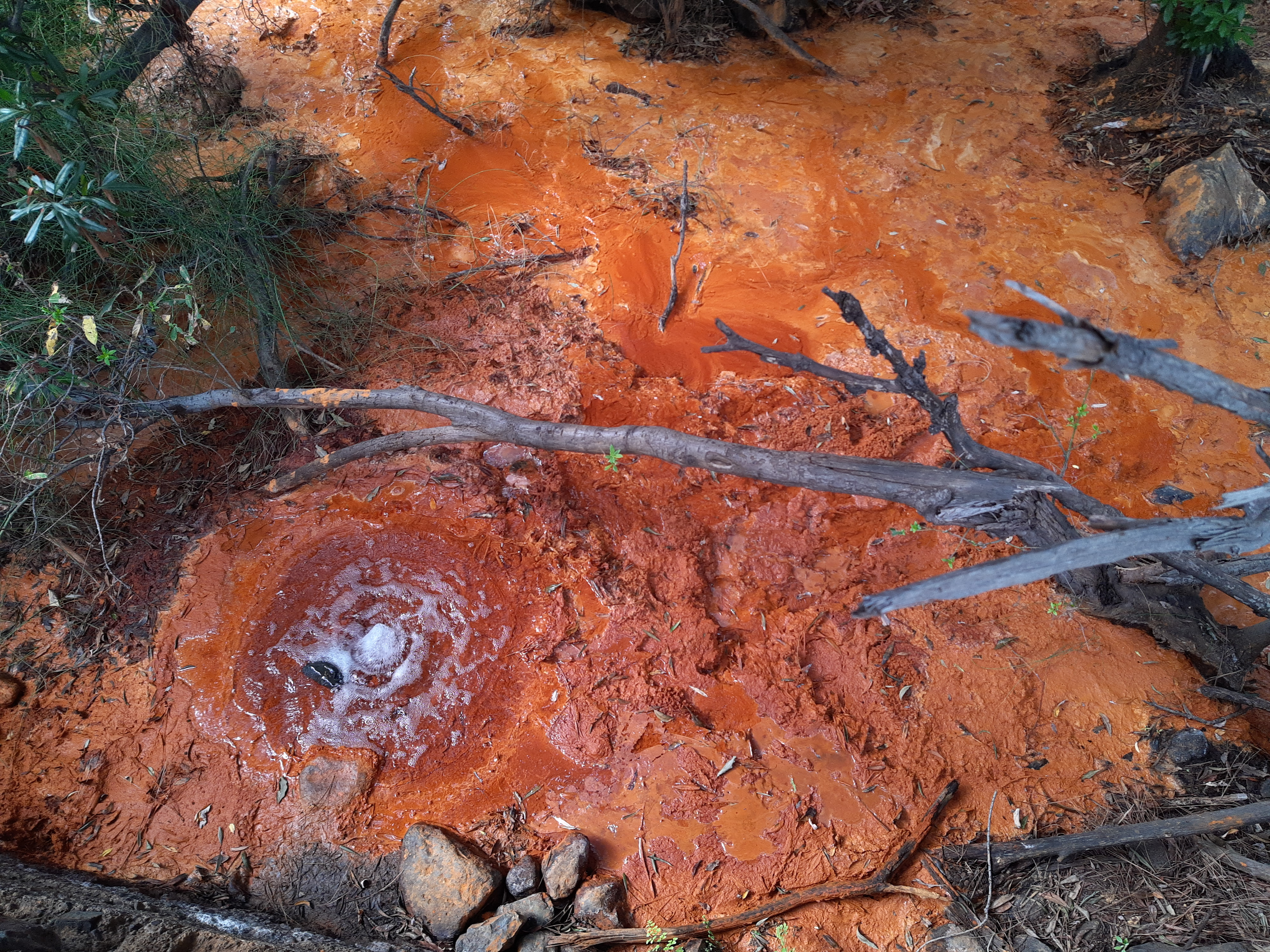
Chalybeate spring below Cascada de los Colores, La Palma

Chalybeate (/kəˈlɪbieɪt/) waters, also known as ferruginous waters, are mineral spring waters containing salts of iron.

== Name ==
The word chalybeate is derived from the Latin word for steel, chalybs, which follows from the Greek word χάλυψ khálups. Khálups is the singular form of Khálubes or Chalybes, who were a people living on Mount Ida in north Asia Minor and who were expert in iron working.

Ferruginous (/fəˈruːdʒɪnəs/) comes from the Latin word ferrūgineus 'of a rusty colour', from ferrūgō 'iron rust', from ferrum 'iron'.

== History ==
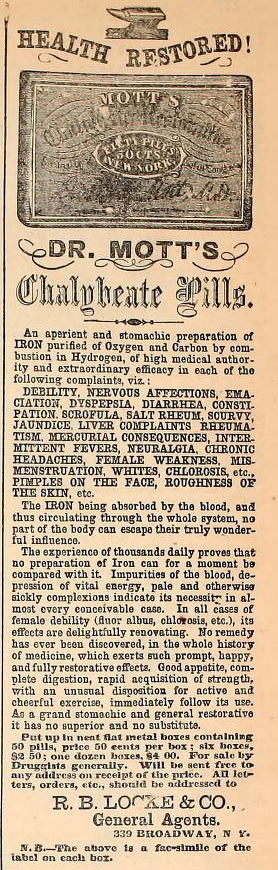
1860 advertisement

Early in the 17th century, chalybeate water was said to have health-giving properties and many people once promoted its qualities. Dudley North, 3rd Baron North, discovered the chalybeate spring at Tunbridge Wells in 1606. His eldest son's physician said the waters contained "vitriol" and the waters of Tunbridge Wells could cure:

the colic, the melancholy, and the vapours; it made the lean fat, the fat lean; it killed flat worms in the belly, loosened the clammy humours of the body, and dried the over-moist brain.

He also apparently said, in verse:

These waters youth in age renew
Strength to the weak and sickly add
Give the pale cheek a rosy hue
And cheerful spirits to the sad.

In 1689, a spring of ferruginous water rich in gas and tasting pleasantly was discovered by Count Lelio Piovene of Vicenza. Local residents called the water from this spring "Saint Anthony's miraculous water" believing it had therapeutic properties. This spring, known today as the Recoaro Spa, is located on the outskirts of Vicenza, in northeastern Italy.

John Radcliffe (1652–1714) discusses the benefits of various mineral waters in the chapter entitled "Of Chalybeat Waters" in his book Dr. Radcliffe's practical dispensatory : containing a complete body of prescriptions, fitted for all diseases, internal and external, digested under proper heads.

Anthony Relhan (c. 1715–1776), promoted the drinking of mineral waters and particularly water from the chalybeate spring in St Anne's Well Gardens, Hove and published A Short History of Brighthelmstone; with Remarks on its Air, an Analysis of its Waters, Particularly of an uncommon Mineral one, long discovered, though but lately used in 1761. This led to a substantial increase in public interest in drinking mineral water. The town of Enfield, New Hampshire, even changed its name temporarily to Relhan because of the profound public interest in this form of therapy.

Princess Victoria, later Queen Victoria, drank the waters every day during her stay in Tunbridge Wells in 1834. She and her mother, the Princess Victoria, Duchess of Kent, would pay a visit to the spring and then stroll along the Pantiles. The water contains a significant level of dissolved mineral salts, with iron and manganese contributing to its characteristic flavour.

The Spire Southampton Private Hospital in Chalybeate Close, Southampton, UK was formerly known as The Chalybeate Hospital until 2007.

== Content of the chalybeate waters from Tunbridge Wells ==
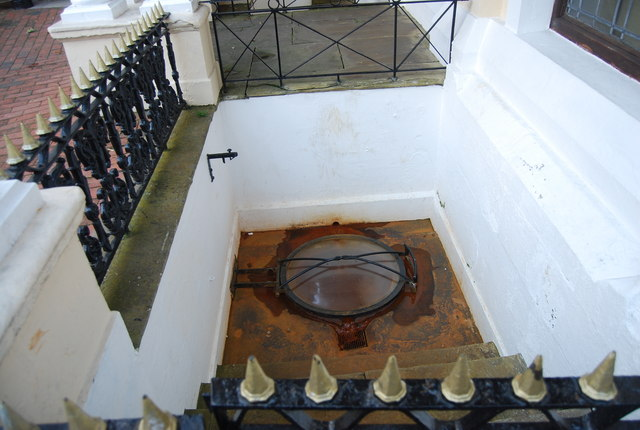
The Chalybeate Spring at Tunbridge Wells

An analysis in 1967 showed it to contain (parts per million):

- Iron(II) carbonate, FeCO_{3} 25.3
- Manganese(II) carbonate, MnCO_{3} 4.6
- Calcium sulfate, CaSO_{4} 60.9
- Magnesium sulfate, MgSO_{4} 13.4
- Magnesium chloride, MgCl_{2} 7.8
- Sodium chloride, NaCl 57.2
- Potassium chloride, KCl 7.3

== Notable chalybeate springs ==
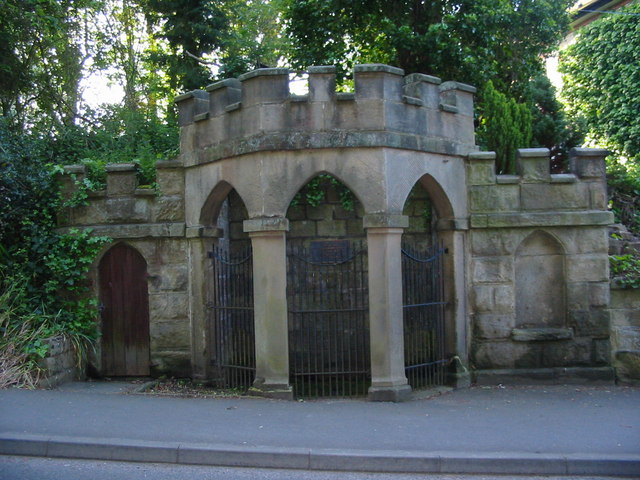
This rather ornate spring well is in the village of Quarndon. A plaque inside the well bears the following inscription: "17th century chalybeate spring well. Once famous spa noted for medicinal waters containing iron. Visited by Daniel Defoe in 1727."

Chalybeate springs are found in:

=== Austria ===
- Muri Spring, Geopark Karawanken, Völkermarkt District (Carinthia)

=== Australia ===
- The Chalybeate Spring at Mittagong, New South Wales

=== Belgium ===
- Spa situated in a valley in the Ardennes mountain chain, some 35 km (22 mi) southeast of Liège, and 45 km (28 mi) southwest of Aachen whose name is known back to Roman times, when the location was called Aquae Spadanae.
- Malmedy

=== Germany ===
- Bad Pyrmont

=== Italy ===
- Recoaro, Vicenza

=== Ireland ===
- Moydow Castle, County Longford
- Chalybeate Well, Garretstown Woods, Garretstown, County Cork
- Merton Hall, County Tipperary

=== Poland ===
- Krynica-Zdrój

=== Romania ===
- Toplitz

=== Russia ===
- Lipetsk, in central Russia

=== South Africa ===
- Caledon, Western Cape. This spring contains the most iron of any chalybeate globally (Darley-Hartley, 1940) and is also the hottest. The thermal waters emerge from the hillside above the small brewing town of Caledoni at 48.889 degrees Celsius (120 degrees Fahrenheit) and feed into the Bath River. The site was known to the Khoi people and was developed into a Victorian spa in the 1800s. The resort has been expanded and receives large numbers of visitors.

=== Spain ===
- Lanjarón, a village in the Alpujarras

=== Sweden ===
- Ramlösa Hälsobrunn, in Helsingborg, Sweden

=== United Kingdom ===
==== England ====
- Alexandra Park in Hastings, East Sussex
- Balcombe, West Sussex
- Bermondsey Spa, south-east of the Tower of London. Around 1770 Thomas Keyse opened some tea gardens. With the discovery of a chalybeate spring the gardens became known as Bermondsey Spa. About 1784 Keyse received a licence to "provide in his garden musical entertainments" like those in the Vauxhall Pleasure Gardens. They were varied by occasional exhibitions of fireworks and the price of admission was one shilling.
- Burton upon Trent, at Sinai Park House
- Chalice Well, Glastonbury
- Cheltenham, Gloucestershire
- Chalybeate Kennels near Ingleborough, North Yorkshire
- Dorton Spa in Buckinghamshire: said to contain four times the iron of Tunbridge Wells
- Gilsland Spa, Cumbria
- George Gap Spa, Great Fryup Dale, North Yorkshire
- The Gloucester Spa, Gloucester
- The Goodison Fountain at Hampstead Heath, Hampstead, North London
- Griffydam, Leicestershire
- Harrogate, North Yorkshire
- Kedleston Hall near Quarndon, Derbyshire
- Kilburn, North London
- Lees, Greater Manchester
- Nash, Buckinghamshire - there being a well in the High Street known locally as Chalybeate, or Bretch, Well. Local folklore suggests that the water would never freeze, even in the harshest of winters. It is now in the front garden of a private house and mostly covered over
- Nill Well, between Yelling and Papworth Everard, Cambridgeshire
- The Red Well, Knapwell, Cambridgeshire
- Robin Hood Hills, Kirkby in Ashfield, Nottinghamshire
- Royal Beulah Spa Upper Norwood, Surrey (now London Borough of Croydon)
- St. Ann's Well Gardens, Hove, East Sussex
- St. Blaise's Well, Bromley, London
- St James Cemetery, Liverpool
- Seend, Wiltshire
- Somersham, Cambridgeshire
- Sandrock Spring, Blackgang, Isle of Wight – discovered 1811; buried in landslide in 1978
- Southwick, Northamptonshire
- Spa Well, Spittal, Northumberland
- Stamford, Lincolnshire
- Tunbridge Wells, Kent
- Tynemouth, Tyne and Wear – currently buried on Longsands beach
- Winteringham, North Lincolnshire

==== Scotland ====
- The Saltcoats Mineral Well, The Holm Plantation, North Ayrshire.
- The Brow Well, Ruthwell - visited by the dying Robert Burns
- The Chapeltoun Burn source near Stewarton, East Ayrshire
- Fraserburgh, northeast Scotland
- Hartfell Spa, near Moffat, in the upper reaches of Annandale, Dumfries and Galloway
- Parson's Well, Drumoak, Aberdeenshire
- Euchan Glen, Sanquhar, Dumfries and Galloway
- Peterhead
- Heavenly Aqua Well, West Linton, Scottish Borders
- Red Well, Whitehills, Aberdeenshire
- Queen Mary's Well, Berry Hill, Aberdeenshire

==== Wales ====
- Ffynnon Goch, Aberaeron, Ceredigion
- Betws Yn Rhos, Conwy
- Llandrindod Wells, central Powys
- Trefriw, Conwy
- Trellech, Monmouthshire
- Garnllwyd farm, Llancarfan, Glamorgan

=== United States ===
- Beersheba Springs, Grundy County, Tennessee
- Brandywine Springs, Wilmington, Delaware
- Brushton, New York, a village in Franklin County
- Chalybeate Springs, Lawrence County, Alabama
- Chalybeate Springs in Gadsden, Alabama
- Chalybeate Springs, Jeffersonville, Indiana; Resort and spa, 1800s, destroyed and buried by the Big Four Railroad in 1907
- Chalybeate, Kentucky
- Chalybeate Spring, Schooley's Mountain, Morris County, New Jersey; active resort and spa from the 1820s until the 1870s (spring source destroyed by road work in 1945)
- Chalybeate Springs, North Carolina
- Chalybeate spring and Chalybeate Springs Hotel near Bedford Springs in Bedford, Pennsylvania
- Licton Springs, Seattle, Washington
- Lithia Springs, Farmville, Virginia
- Iron Springs, Manitou Springs, Colorado
- Saratoga Springs in Saratoga Springs, New York
- Sharon Springs, a village in Schoharie County, New York
- Spring Water Park in Williamston, South Carolina
- Sweet Chalybeate Springs, Allegheny County, Virginia
- Tahama Spring, Colorado Springs, Colorado
- Tinton Falls, Monmouth County, New Jersey; still active, but fenced off by the township
- The Greenbrier, White Sulphur Springs, West Virginia

== Places named for chalybeate springs ==
Several places throughout the world have taken their name from similar springs, including:

- Chalybeate Springs, Alabama, Lawrence County
- Chalybeate, Mississippi
- Chalybeate Springs, Kentucky
- Chalybeate Springs, Georgia, Meriwether County
- Chalybeate Springs, North Carolina, Harnett County
- Chalybeate Springs, Virginia, Scott County
- Chalybeate Springs, Winnsboro, Wood County, Texas
- Hughes Springs, Cass County, Texas
- Sweet Chalybeate, Alleghany County, Virginia
- Chalybeate Spring Temple, Sharon Springs, New York
- Chalybeate Street, Aberystwyth, Ceredigion, Wales, United Kingdom
- Chalybeate Street (Ffynnon Goch), Aberaeron, Ceredigion, Wales
