= Geopark =

Protected area with significant geology

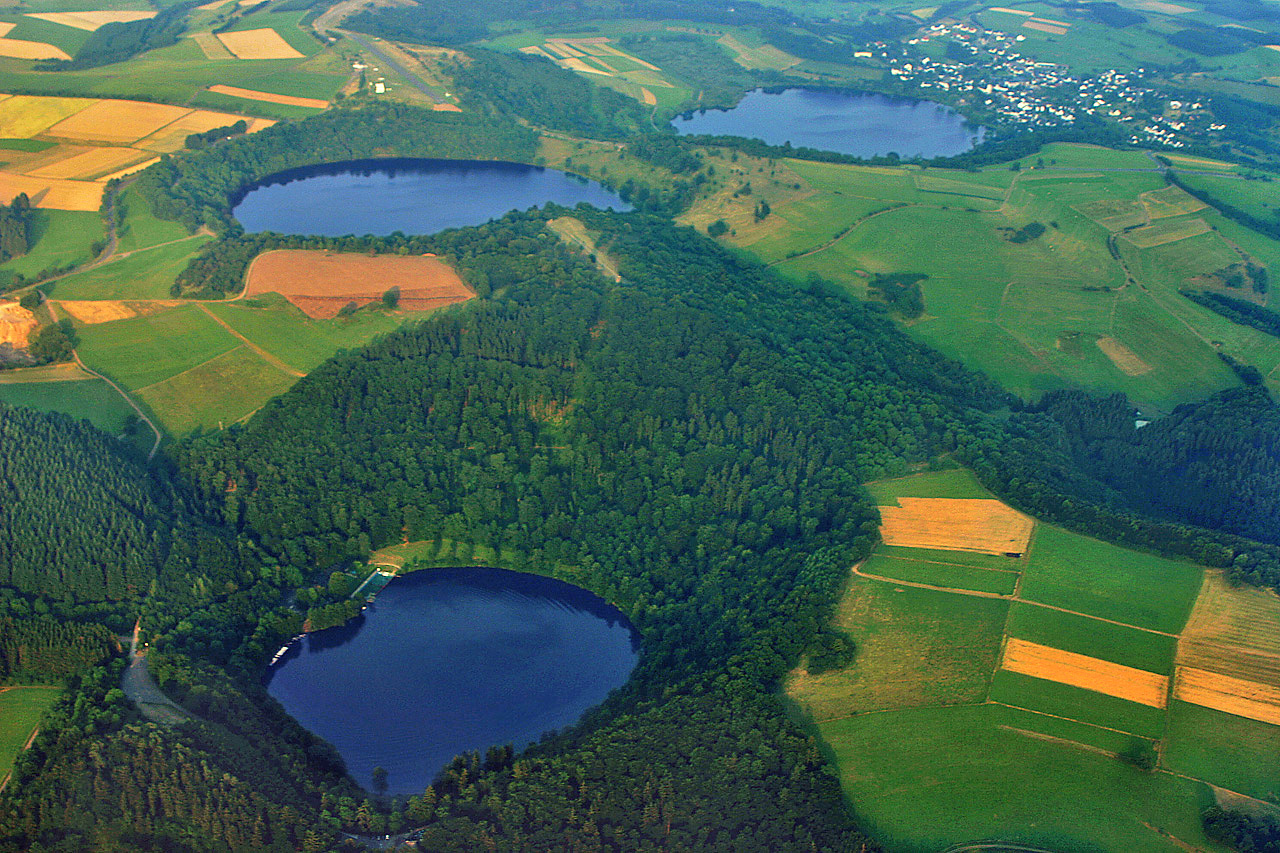
- The maars, or volcanic lakes, of Natur- und Geopark Vulkaneifel in Germany, the first geopark under the name

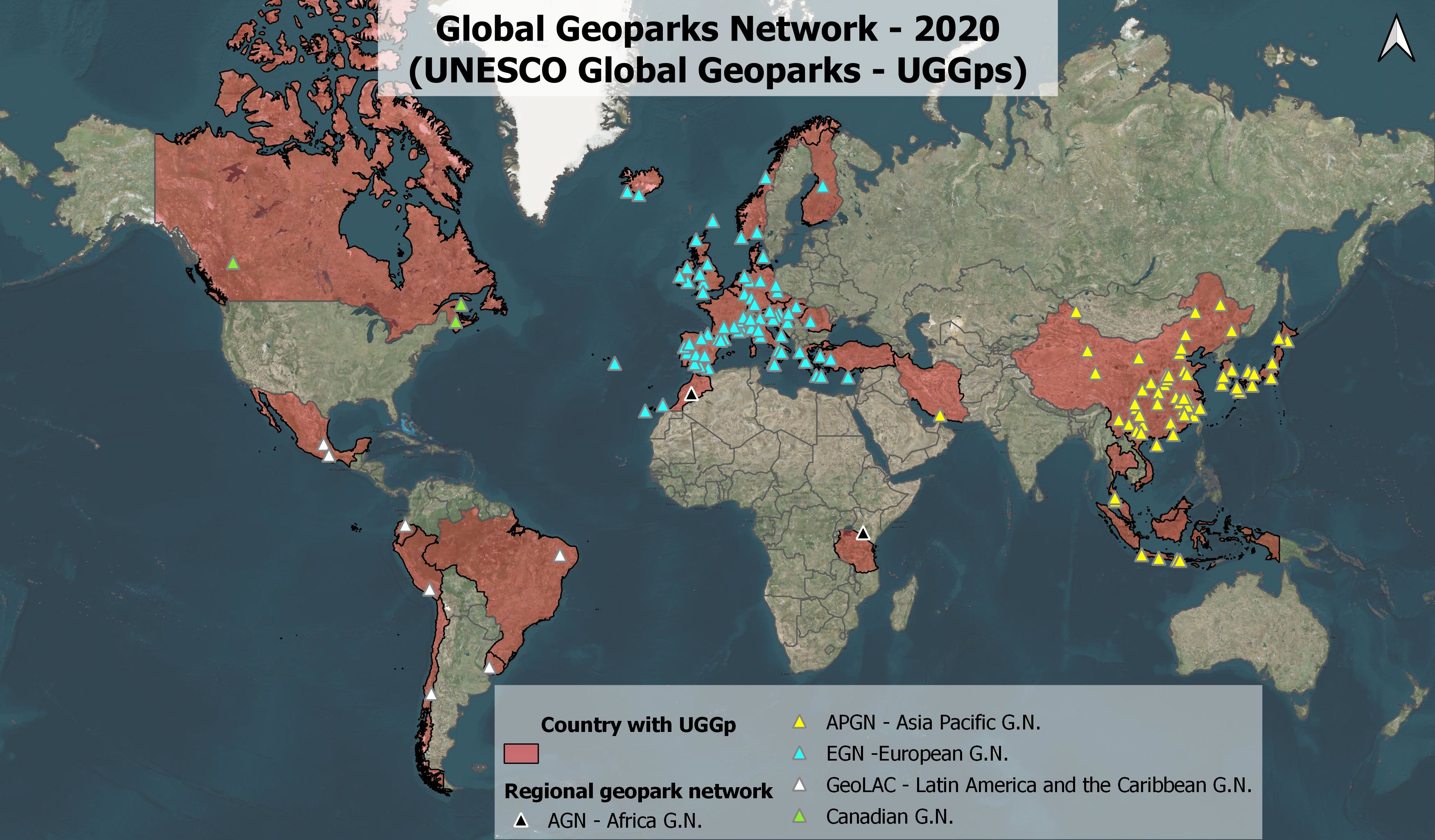
- World map of geoparks included in the UNESCO Global Geoparks Network (GGN) as of 2020
- Etymology: Combination of "geo-" and "park"
- Owner: The nation(s) in which the park is defined
- Administrator: The nation's government
- Camp sites: Defined by park
- Paths: Defined by park
- Terrain: Sites and habitats of geological interest
- Water: Possibly
- Vegetation: Possibly
- Species: Possibly
- Collections: Possibly
- Designation: UNESCO designations of national geopark, national and regional, or national, regional, and global
- Budget: Sustainable
- Parking: Possibly
- Public transit: Possibly
- Facilities: Possibly
- Website: Typically

A geopark is a protected area with internationally significant geology within which sustainable development is sought and which includes tourism, conservation, education and research concerning not just geology but other relevant sciences. (Note: The source is an on-line journal without page numbers, described at Sustainability Home. In the article a full description of "the geopark concept" with relevant geo-vocabulary can be found under 1. Introduction.) It also supports the communities that live within its boundaries.

In 2005, a European Geopark was defined as being: "a territory with a particular geological heritage and with a sustainable territorial development....the ultimate aim of a European Geopark is to bring enhanced employment opportunities for the people who live there."

Today the geopark is virtually synonymous with the UNESCO geopark, which is defined and managed under the voluntary authority of UNESCO's International Geoscience and Geoparks Programme (IGGP). UNESCO provides a standard for geoparks and a certification service to territories that apply for it. The service is available to member states of UNESCO.

The list of members is not the same as the member states of the United Nations. Membership in the UN does not automatically imply membership of UNESCO, even though UNESCO is part of the UN. Both lists have about 193 member nations, but not exactly the same 193. The UN list covers most of the geopolitical world, but the UNESCO list lacks Israel, for example, which resigned in 2018 because they believed UNESCO is anti-Israel.

The UNESCO Global Geoparks Network co-ordinates the activities of the many UNESCO Global Geoparks (UGGp's) around the world. It is divided into regional networks, such as the European Geoparks Network. The EGN historically preceded the UGGN, being founded in 2000 with the first four geoparks. It joined with UNESCO in 2001 and in 2005 agreed in the Madonie Declaration to be a regional network of the UGGps, which had been created by UNESCO in 2004.

The Madonie Declaration of 2004, which was signed by Nikolas Zouros for the EGN and Wolfgang Eder for UNESCO, established what was later called a "bottom up" system of precedence. (Note: This term usually refers to the retention of local sustainability functions as a priority, and is treated as an advantage) An applicant geopark must first be a member of the EGN before applying to the UGGN. Furthermore, another level was created, the National Geoparks Network, which at first glance seems a contradiction in terms. Geoparks are international. What the Declaration meant was, if a potentially international type of site (a possible geosite) existed within the candidate park's country, the park must belong to it before it can apply to the regional network. This type was dubbed an NGN. Its sites could then be included under the geopark umbrella by being candidates for the international network. In 2014 the creation of other regions besides the EGN was allowed and encouraged, permitting geoparks to fulfill their declared global nature.

== Etymology and usage of geopark ==
Ge- or geo- is a word-formative prefix derived from the ancient Greek word for "Earth." Due to the use of ancient Greek and Latin words to form international scientific vocabulary, geo- might appear in any modern language of any type by the process of compounding. Since geo- is well known in most modern languages it is especially amenable to word production, the impromptu manufacture of words of self-evident meaning. Geopark and all its associated new geo- words began as produced neologisms but are fast becoming legitimate scientific compounds.

Produced words are often open to interpretation: they mean whatever the writer intended them to mean or whatever the reader interpreted them to mean. Eventually the word receives a common understanding that can be dictionary-defined. "Geopark" is right at that point. Henriques and Brilha, after listing four interpretations not to be allowed now, (Note: "a new ... protected area," "geological park," a protected "geological heritage," a topic "just about geology.") cite features that must be present in the application of "geopark:" a development plan, a geoheritage, conservation, and sustainability. These are features that must receive the credibility of the international organizations certifying the park as a geopark, without which certification they cannot be scientific geoparks. The overall qualification, therefore, is that they must be certified as geoparks by the accepted international organizations. No certification, no geopark.

The innovation of geo-compounds is neither new or recent, the most ancient perhaps being the geo-metria, "earth measurement," of ancient Greece. There have been a smattering of "Earth" words ever since. Geo-logia is a relative newcomer, in mediaeval Latin "the study of earthly things" (such as law) in contrast to divine things. It was preempted to refer to the 18th century topics of fossils and rock stratification. Most geo-compounds come from the 19th and early 20th century. Geo- means "Earth" rather than "geological," which would be redundant. (Note: For example, geology would be "geological study," which only repeats the defined word. The "Earth" meaning, however, is not a hard and fast rule if the producers of the geo-word intended "geological:" Farsani 2012 page 23, geo-tourism for "geological tourism.")

After a floruit of international exploration, scientific research, and park-building in the later 19th century, the world wars represent a sharp decline of conservation and tourism, as the goals of war are opposite those of peace. Even the League of Nations, predecessor of the United Nations, did not unite. The last world war saw the irrecoverable destruction of national heritages and the terrible misuse of science. The United Nations and its and educational, scientific, and cultural branch, UNESCO, heir to the League's International Committee on Intellectual Cooperation, both founded in 1945 to do a better job at peace-keeping and cooperation, were at first hindered by the Cold War. As it manifestly drew to an end in the 1970s, and the countries of east Europe would be open once more, UNESCO began to be more effective, formulating organizations to respond to a growing demand for the protection of the heritage that was left. (Note: Some sources trace the interest in holistic conservation to the UNESCO programs of the early 1970s: MAB, WHC, and IGCP. The geopark concept, however, emerged independently in the 1980s.)

In 1980, the decision was made to create the first geopark in the USSR (it was to be created on the left bank of the Moskva River in Moscow and become part of the Geological Museum).

The current round of innovation to which geo-park belongs dates to the last decades of the 20th century and the first of the 21st, although it may not be over yet. They began as marketing terms in the vending of what Farsani calls "sustainable tourism," characterizing it as "a new niche market," the key words being, in addition to geopark, geotourism, geoheritage, geosite, geoconservation, and geodiversity. (Note: As illustration to the process, Farsani innovates several more ad hoc (Page 2): "Moreover, geoparks strive to involve local communities in ... geo-marketing, such as geotours, geoproducts, geo-museums, geo-sports, geo-lodging, geo-restaurants and geo-bakeries.") It is not possible to discover what individuals first innovated the words. Authors such as Farsani can only state the groups among which they were thought to be first current.

The term “geopark” was apparently first used to describe a newly instituted park in the west Vulkaneifel (Note: The name of the former district of Daun was changed to Vulkaneifel in 2007. The town of Daun remains Daun.) district of the Eifel Mountains of Rhineland-Palatinate, Germany. The region had tended to be economically depressed due to the preference of buyers and sellers for markets in nearby France. They did have a noted geological asset: a now dormant forested volcanic range. The land shows evidence of ancient volcanos, including crater lakes, mineral springs, and pipe formations. The place also abounds in fossils. Although of interest to scientists and hikers, the terrain was generally regarded as a liability, some 19th-century plans even having been made to fill lakes. (Note: The general sentiment of the 19th century was that agriculturally non-productive land should be made productive by severe alteration of the terrain. The Italians had filled in a number of classically known volcanic lakes in central Italy, rendering them into farmland.)

== Types of geopark ==
The word geopark is no longer open to the process of innovation through word production. It has been defined by various organizations in the field of earth science. An essential element of the definition is that a geopark must be branded as part of an international geopark network. A national park is not necessarily a geopark. For example, the United States has a system of national parks, but none of them are geoparks. Canada, on the other hand, has several.

A geopark network requires the branding of an international scientific association. They only brand protected areas that meet certain standards, as presented above. The branding has no effect on the previous status of an area. It might already have been other types of park, such as a national park. If the geopark branding is removed, it is still those other types of park. No matter what the type, management, the exercise of authority over the area, is always national; the scientific organizations have no sovereignty; they are simply advisory and certifying agencies guided by decisions made at international conventions.

=== National geoparks ===
A "national geopark" is a post de facto designation by UNESCO of a "geographical area" or a transnational geographical area already known to be "of international, regional, and/or national importance" as a candidate geopark. It has not yet been certified as belonging to a regional or the global UNESCO geopark network. It has been "already inscribed" as a member of some other network; that is, "national geopark" is a sort of floating candidacy that can be attached to any other parkland of interest, after which attachment the parkland qualifies for the designation of geopark. The candidates so designated are termed a "national network for geoparks." If it exists in a member nation all geoparks of the regional network in that nation as well as the global network must also belong to it.

Some of the networks from which UNESCO national geoparks might be chosen are World Heritage Sites, Agenda 21, Man and the Biosphere Programme. UNESCO also provides a list of recommended geosite types, such as "minerals and mineral resources," "fossils," etc.

The national networks (one for each nation) are intended as the bottom level of the bottom-up system. They support national conservation, education, cultural development, research, as well as economic sustainability. There is some effort to control conflict of mandate; for example, Fossils are not allowed to be sold, which practice would favor sustainability, but work against conservation. For some geoparks, such as Sitia geopark (east Crete), the conflict between geotourist development and the conservation of archaeological sites is a severe one, reaching the law courts. As with the other levels of geopark, the parks are subject to review for recertification every four years.

=== Transnational geoparks ===
A transnational geopark crosses a national border to extend continuously in two member nations. The park must belong to two national geoparks, one in each nation, and one regional geopark. Both national geoparks collaborate to prepare a single application, which is submitted by both to the regional and global networks. Both member nations must endorse the park. The management bodies in each nation must collaborate to establish a single set of activities and strategies for the entire park. They can appoint either two collaborating managements or one management.

The certified transnational geoparks are:

- Geopark Karawanken
- Marble Arch Caves Global Geopark
- Novohrad – Nógrád Geopark
- Muscau Arch / Łuk Mużakowa UNESCO Global Geopark

=== Regional geoparks ===
A regional geopark is a member of an independent network of geoparks that has agreed with UNESCO to provide candidates for the global network. All members of the regional network are a priori members of a national geopark network. They are also members of the global network if they are certified for it. A regional geopark would not be a global geopark if it has not yet been certified as such or its certification has lapsed and it has applied for recertification (Yellow Card status).

A region is more than one country. (Note: Some sources use the term "continent," as the regions do approximate continents. They are not exactly the same, however. The GGN site in 2022 lists 6 continents, of which "Oceania" has no parks yet, and 4 regions. The difference is in the western hemisphere, where the parks are not exactly distributed by continent.) A current list of accepted regions is:

- African Geoparks Network
- Asia Pacific Geoparks Network (APGN)
- European Geoparks Network (EGN)
- Latin America and the Caribbean Geoparks Network (LACGN)

=== Acting regional geopark ===
Canada has some geoparks. The most logical regional classification for these might have been the "North American Regional Geopark Network," following a proposed continental tradition for geopark regions. However, the United States does not have any geoparks, and Mexico is covered under Latin America. There are no other nations in North America that can be combined into a region. The United States and Israel resigned from UNESCO in 2018 because they believed that UNESCO is anti-Israel, though the US re-joined in 2023.

Canadian geoparks according to the rules must belong to a regional network before they can apply for global status, but there is none, and may not be any in the foreseeable future. UNESCO therefore treating Canada as a special case allows the national geoparks network, the Canadian Geoparks Network, to give global and green card certification. A regionalization based strictly on continents did not turn out to be practical for other regions also.

=== UNESCO Global Geoparks ===
A global geopark is one that has been certified to the fullest extent, and is therefore a member of UNESCO's global network of geoparks. It is per se also a member of a regional geopark network and also a member of a national geopark network, if its nation has one, or a transnational geopark. A certification is good for four years, after which it must be certified again. In the language of certification, a recertified global geopark is termed a "green-card geopark." (Note: The origin of this terminology is obscure. It shares some essential features of the sports penalty card, which classifies the status of players after a penalty, and is based on the traffic lights: green for go, yellow for stop and then go, red for stop. Less likely is the green card theory, which compares the geopark green card to the residency card of the USCIS, giving the geopark permission to stay in the network. However, the USCIS has no yellow or red cards. In any case the "cards" of UNESCO only apply to the recertification. In its original certification, the park is only "certified" and is given a certificate to prove it.) If a geopark fails recertification it is given two years to pass, in which it is a "yellow-card geopark." (Note: Apparently a geopark that is not originally "endorsed" is not yellow-card, but still gets a 2-year deferment to address the issues.) After two years if it is still unrecertified it is a "red-card geopark;" that is, no longer a geopark, and is removed from connection with or concern by UNESCO. To reapply, it must start the application over. Recertified geoparks do not have to keep the same borders; only a portion may be recertified.

== See also ==
- Geoconservation
- Geotourism

== Reference bibliography ==
- Du, Yi; Girault, Yves (2018). "A Genealogy of UNESCO Global Geopark: Emergence and Evolution". International Journal of Geoheritage and Parks. 6 (2): 1–17. Bibcode:2018IJGP....6....1D. doi:10.17149/ijgp.j.issn.2577.4441.2018.02.001. S2CID 239600555.
- Farsani, Neda Torani (2012). Sustainable Tourism in Geoparks through Geotourism and Networking (PhD). Universidade de Aveiro.
- Henriques, Maria Helena; Brilha, José (2017). "UNESCO Global Geoparks: a strategy towards global understanding and sustainability". Episodes. 40 (4): 349–355. doi:10.18814/epiiugs/2017/v40i4/017036. hdl:1822/48010.
- UGGpC (2016). Final Report, 1st Session (PDF) (Report). UNESCO. Archived from the original (PDF) on 31 March 2023.
- UNESCO (2010). Guidelines and Criteria for National Geoparks seeking UNESCO's assistance to join the Global Geoparks Network (GGN) (PDF). UNESCO.
