= Maria Olip =

Slowenian resistance fighter

Death sentence against Maria Olip (p.1)

Maria "Micka" Olip' (born Maria Županc / Schupanz: 29 March 1913 - 29 April 1943) was a Slovene resistance fighter against National Socialism in Carinthia.

In 1943, following capture and more than two months of interrogation-torture sessions, she faced a session of the special "People's Court" at Klagenfurt on 9 April 1943. She was one of 26 convicted partisans, and one of 13 sentenced to death (and the only woman).

== Life ==
Maria Županc was born one of her parents' (at least) four children in Ebriach, a small village in the rural Eisenkappel-Vellach administrative district. The region was one of remote mountain villages in which Slovene dialects predominated, but in the 1920 Carinthian plebiscite pragmatic considerations of perceived economic advantage had trumped nationalistic separatism, and throughout her childhood the district had remained part of the Austrian province of Carinthia, rather than joining up with Yugoslavia, across the mountains. Georg and Barbara Županc, her parents, were peasant farmers.

With her brothers, Ivan and Miha Županc she was involved in political activism under the leadership of Valentin Kordesch, on behalf of the Communist Party, which had been illegal since an emergency decree dated May 1933, issued by the Austrofascist government of Chancellor Dollfuss. Maria Županc was still young when she married Max Olip from the adjacent district of Zell Pfarre / Sele Fara. He was a nephew of Thomas Olip (1884–1943), who would emerge as a leader of Slovene partisan resistance, and who later died on the guillotine at the same Vienna execution facility and on the same day as Maria Olip herself.

The political context changed in 1938 when the hitherto independent Federal State of Austria was integrated into Germany, which ushered in a more uncompromising approach to political opposition by the security services. The "Anschluss" also made unavoidable - if it was not already unavoidable - national involvement in the forthcoming war, which broke out in September 1939. Maria Olip's home region was now on the mountainous southern frontier of an enlarged and increasingly embattled enlarged German state. Between 1941 and 1943 that part of Slovenia, directly to the south of Austrian Carinthia was under German military occupation. German occupation was resisted by Slovene partisans from north of the border who would have classified themselves as (Slovene speaking) Austrian/German citizens. Maria Olip worked as an "underground messenger" for her brother, Ivan Županc, who had been a founder of the Slovene partisan movement in Carinthia.

Another of her brothers, Miha Županc, was also an active member of the Slovene resistance partisans, and it was during a meeting at his remote small-holding that she reported how she was now in contact not just with longstanding "old" comrades, but had been establishing links with a succession of new comrades. She had, in particular, been striking up conversations with off-duty German soldiers who came to take their holidays in the local mountain valleys, in order to try and win them over to join with the Slovene partisans. Even more dangerously, at the instigation of her resistance comrade Franz Weinzierl she had sent a letter to a man called Johann Rozmann in the provincial capital Klagenfurt, inviting him to work with the partisans. She helped Franc Pasterk, who was in Klagenfurt on home leave from the army, to flee to the partisans in Upper Carniola. In September 1942, in the aftermath of a battle against the Second Slovenian Kokra battalion, the Germans came across a "Županc letter" which included mention of a "sick sister", which appeared to be a coded reference to a female partisan group member. From this - probably in combination with other clues they had already acquired - they were able to infer that Maria Olip was involved in the "Osvobodilna fronta" anti-fascist liberation movement.

On 11 November 1942 two apparent partisans, Helmut Sovetz und Felix Koprivnik, turned up at the "Golopkeusche" (farmstead) on the Waschnigberg (local mountain). Sovetz befriended Maria Olip who took him to be a forestry worker with communist tendencies, and told him about an upcoming meeting of local partisans. In the evening she arrived at the meeting with the two men. The participants were then taken by surprise when a gang of Nazi paramilitaries (SS). Olip's trust had clearly been betrayed by two government spies. As the wounded comrades were driven away she was able to jump out of the truck and disappear into the bushes; but the next day, while making her way back to Eisenkappel, she was found and recaptured by a paramilitary patrol. Some time later a comrade called Maria Haller spotted her on "shower day" in the city jail at Klagenfurt, and reported back that her entire body was covered with wounds, caused by the torture to which she had been subjected. It is not entirely clear what information her interrogators extracted from her, but at the subsequent trial in which she was included the court presumably relied on their testimony when it determined that she was a "fanatical agitator and hater" ("fanatische Hasserin und Hetzerin") and referred to her as the "shotgun woman" ("Flintenweib").

For more than two months she was subjected to a programme of torture and interrogation, during the course of which several of her teeth were knocked out. In the Gestapo prison she also repeatedly underwent the unsettling experience of seeing other prisoners being carried out after their interrogation-torture sessions. Confessions allegedly extracted from her led to a number of further arrests. However, since the interrogations were carried out in German, a language of which Olip understood very little, the record of the interrogations contains many inaccuracies and distortions. Shortly before the trial a lengthy indictment was presented to her, and she refuted much of what she was recorded as having said.

On 9 April 1943 Maria Olip faced the special "People's Court" at Klagenfurt. Ominously, for those familiar with his judicial record, the presiding judge was Roland Freisler. She was the only woman sentenced to death. Thirteen female co-defendants were sentenced to prison terms of between nine months and eight years. (Note: Maria Olip's female co-defendants, sentenced to prison terms of between nine months and eight year, were Sabina Ogris, Olga Kelih, Katarina Pristovnik, Marija Linasi, Justina Jug, Ana Oraže, Ursula Weinzierl, Katarina Pasterk, Ursula Olip, Zora Jug, Marija Ogris, Marija Pristovnik and Vida Jug. Twelve male co-defendants were sentenced to death. These were Thomas Olip, Jakob Orasche, Johann Doujak, Franc Pristovnik, Florian Kelich, Bartholomäus Orasche, Ulrich Kelich, Franz Weinzierl, Georg Jurij Pasterk, Michael Schupanz, Johann Orasche and Franz Gregoritsch.) The executions took place on 29 April 1943 at the National Execution Facility at the District Court Complex in Vienna.

After the war the remains of Maria Olip's body were exhumed and sent to Zell Pfarre for reburial.
