= Geoconservation =

Conservation practice

Geoconservation is the practice of recognising, protecting and managing sites and landscapes which have value for their geology or geomorphology. The conservation of these geological sites is through government agencies and local geological societies in areas such as Europe and Africa. The designation of these sites is done through an analysis of the site, and the production of proper management infrastructure. The principles of geoconservation are to create a means of protection for the sites, and assess their value to the geological community. Typically the conservation of geodiversity at a site or within a landscape takes place alongside that of biodiversity.

== In European countries ==
The state of geoconservation legislation in 37 countries in Europe was described by specialists in each country and published in Geoheritage in Europe and its conservation in 2012 by ProGEO (The European Association for the Conservation of the Geological Heritage, now, in 2023, the International Association for the Conservation of Geological Heritage).

== In the UK ==
In the late 1970s, the former Nature Conservancy Council initiated the Geological Conservation Review (GCR), a comprehensive assessment of the key geological and geomorphological sites within England, Scotland and Wales, a task which was largely completed by 1990. Over 3000 sites across Britain were identified and many are now designated as sites of special scientific interest (SSSIs), thus providing them with statutory protection. These geological SSSIs are now managed by the respective country nature conservation bodies; Natural England, NatureScot and Natural Resources Wales. A similar approach has been taken in Northern Ireland with the Earth Science Conservation Review (ESCR).

Many thousands of geosites across Great Britain are given protection at a level below that afforded by SSSI status. Originally referred to as regionally important geological sites, terms such as 'Local Geological Sites' and County Geology Site are now in use for them in England and 'Local Geodiversity Sites' in Scotland, whilst in Wales, they are referred to as 'Regionally Important Geodiversity Sites' (or RIGS). Numerous local groups have been established to protect and conserve these sites, all coming under the 'umbrella organisation', GeoConservationUK.

== Principles and protected areas ==
The principles of geoconservation are to create an inventory of geoheritage sites, create an assessment of their value, manage their conservation, monitor the geoconserved sites and promote the sites through interpretation. The geoconserved sites can be added to the inventory by field specialists who observe the site through surveying, mapping and field work. The site will be documented with the non-specialist landowners, rangers and protected area managers.

The main objective of geoconservation is to protect the area that is to be conserved. This is done by assessing the value of the geological structures and composition of the site. The value of the site is based on the cultural and aesthetic value, the value for geotourism and biodiversity conservation. The geomorphological sites to be conserved can be static features such as relict glacial landforms, or active features such as coastal and river landforms. An assessment of the management of the site can provide an idea of how to protect the site and to how the conservation of the site will be maintained. The management of the site should include how suitable the area is to be a site of geotourism. The management plan will give the practicality of the site, and will be used to assess how the site can be taken care of.

The geosites are zoned to provide proper management of the protected areas. The core areas are the places in the geoheritage site that are the most important for protection, and require the higher amounts of infrastructure. The buffer areas is the zone around the core areas that will support the core zone and be used for a wider range of activities. To maintain the protection and structure of the geoconservation area, site condition monitoring is performed to ensure this. Site condition monitoring is the assessment of the protocols that were set for the site, and an assessment to see if the conservation objectives are being met. Regularly scheduled assessment of the site can ensure the proper management and conservation of the site.

== In Africa ==
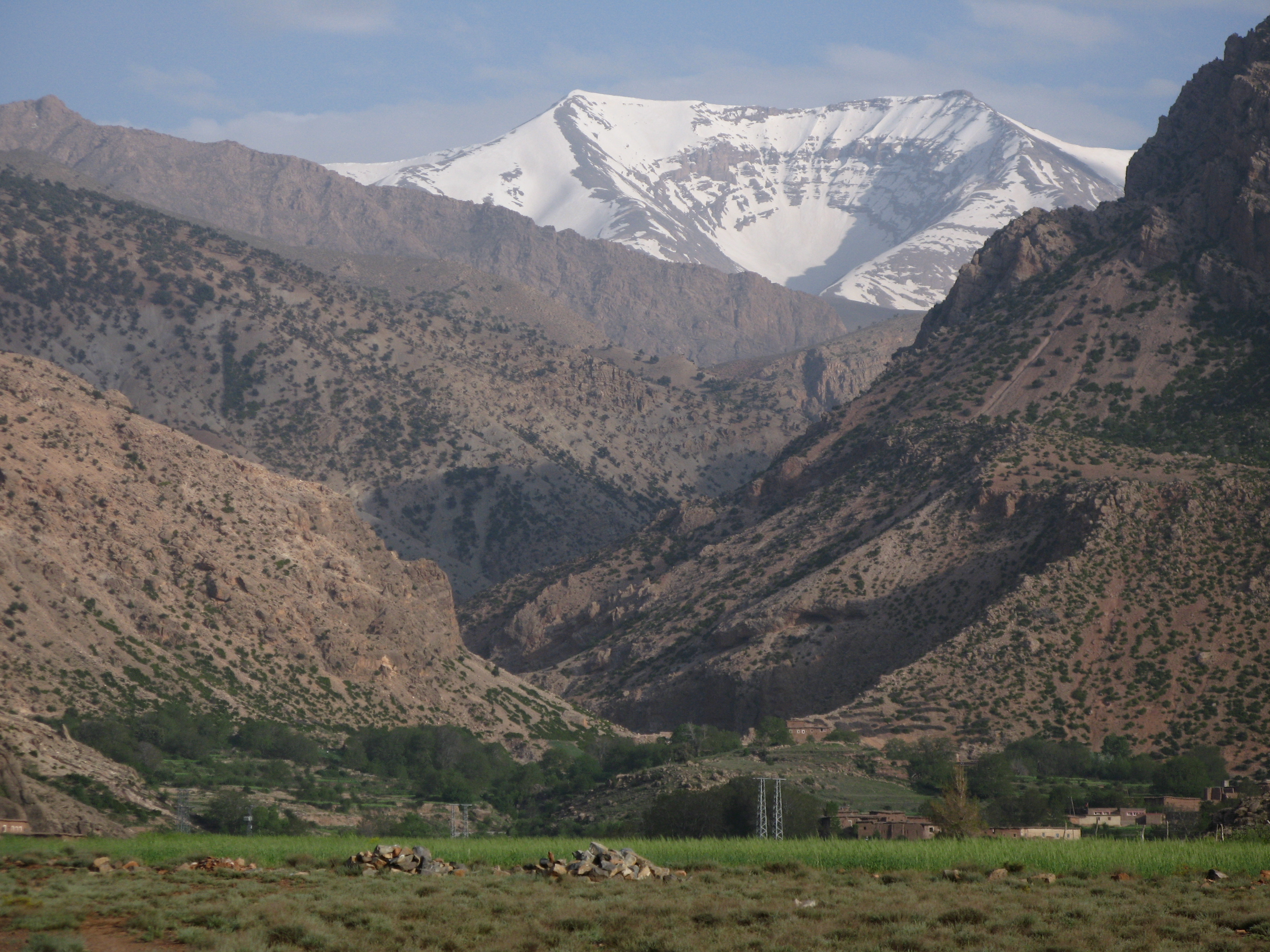
M'Goun Area in Morocco

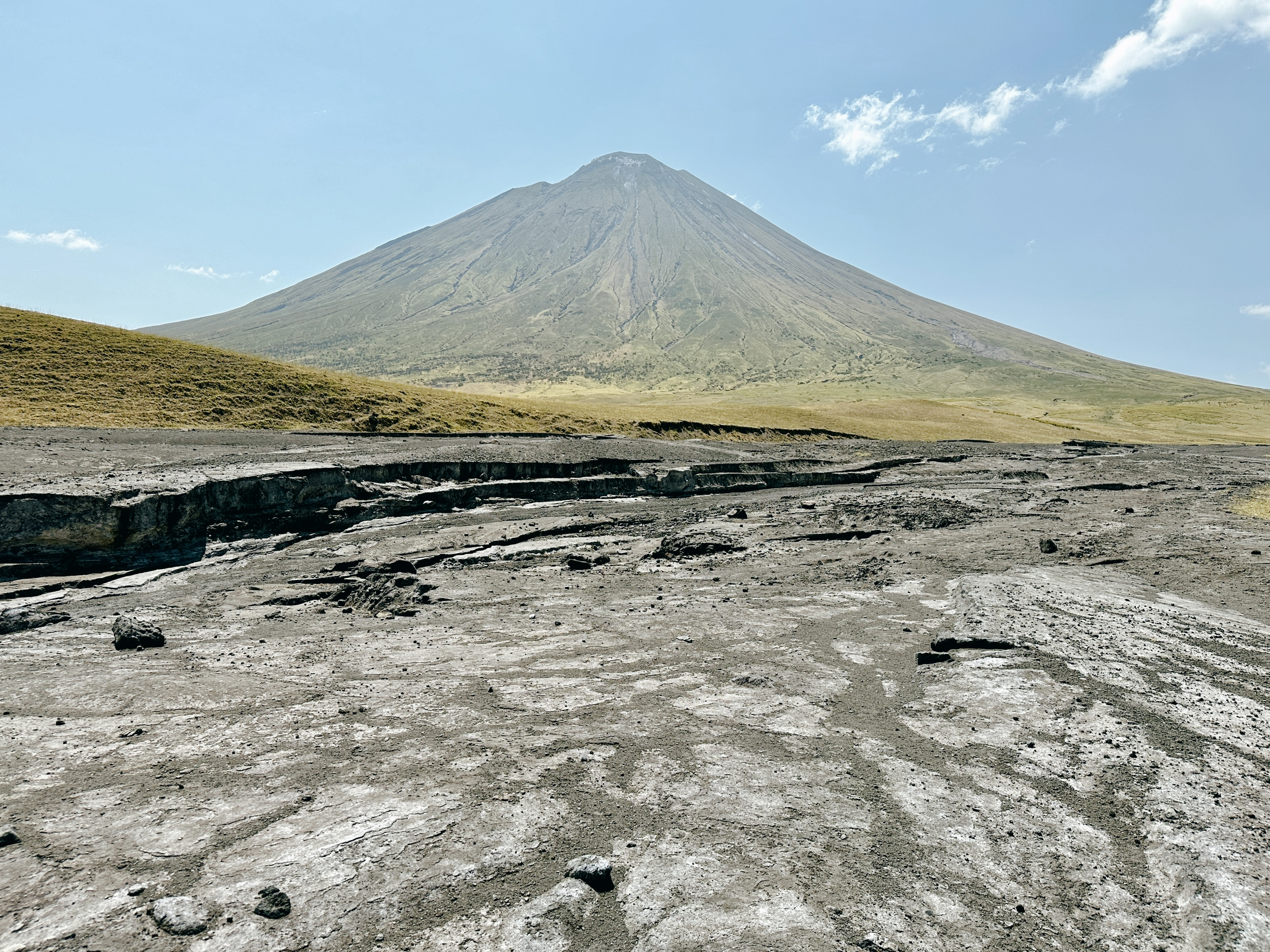
Ngorongoro Lengai Area in Tanzania

The African continent has many sites that are in the process of becoming geoconserved sites. Africa shows many areas that are of geoheritage value, and these sites show different types of geoheritage value. Many of the sites that are in the process of having geoconserved stars are along the coast of the continent, and in the southern and northern edges. The Geosciences and Geoparks Programme in the Natural Science Sector, has two geoparks listed for protection in Africa. There is the M'Goun UGGp in Morocco and the Ngorongoro Lengai UGGp in Tanzania. These two geoparks only represent 1% of the available geosites that are listed as areas of needed conservation in Africa based on the World Heritage Sites under UNESCO. Many of the available geoheritage sites in Africa do not have the government infrastructure to provide the necessary management and protection of the areas.

An area in South Angola has been proposed as having a community-based protection of geoheritage sites. The Tudavala and Leba geosites are not under any current protection, but have recently been classified as an important cultural landscape by the government of Angola. The proposed conservation model is to use the local community to conserve the area and help with protecting the geoheritage sites, instead of government based management. A geosite in Madagascar is being used to test the ability of protection in geoparks through the infrastructure of Madagascar. Isalo Park is the pilot site that shows valuable geoheritage for the country of Madagascar, and with proper management can become a geoconserved site in the future.

== See also ==
- Geopark
