= Muri Spring =

Mineral water spring in Carinthia, Austria

Coordinates: 46.420054°N 14.5454°E

- Muri Quelle (German); Murijev vrelec (Slovene)
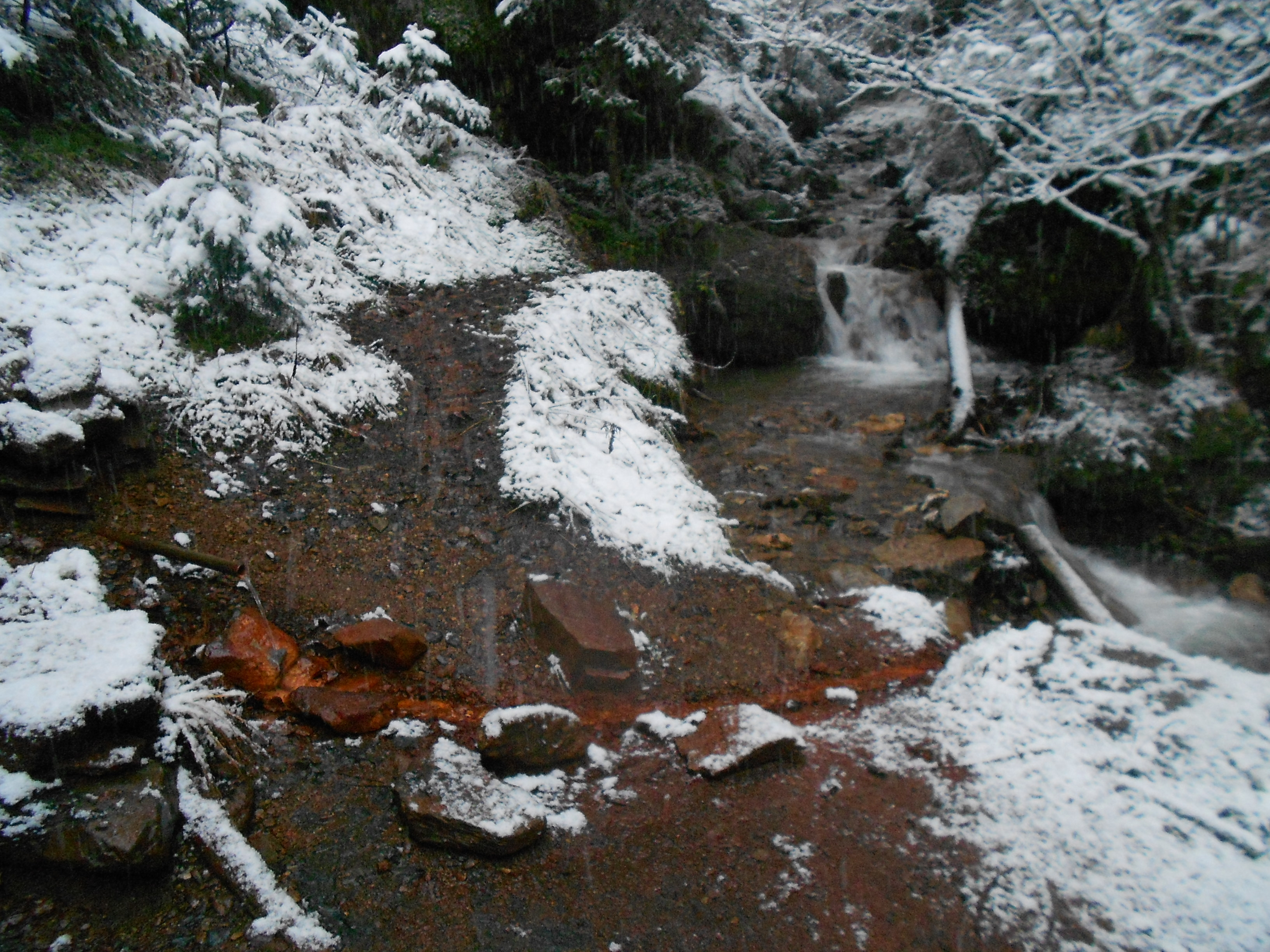

- Location: Goli Vrh, Carinthia, Austria
- Type: iron-rich mineral spring

Muri Spring (German: Muri-Quelle, Slovene: Murijev vrelec) is a chalybeate mineral spring on the Austrian side of the Austria-Slovenia border, on the slope of a hill named Goli Vrh. The spring is next to the main road leading from Jezersko towards the village of Bad Vellach. The water arises from Paleozoic schists, which contain a high concentration of iron minerals. Due to the high mineral content, the water leaves a marked trace.

During the rain, the fallen water runs underground and mixes with carbon dioxide, which emerges from deeper parts of the Earth's crust. Such water dissolves iron minerals present in the rock of this area. The source disappears during drought and low rain.
