= County geology site =

Conservation designation in the British Isles

County geology site (CGS) is a geoconservation designation used in parts of the United Kingdom and the Republic of Ireland. In the UK the designation confers no statutory protection, unlike SSSI (Site of Special Scientific Interest).

== Classification ==
The designation shows a site's geological importance and the areas designated appear in planning policies, and on planning maps. The designation is classified by the UK government as a 'Local Site' though sites can be of regional, national or international importance.

== Regional variations ==
Many local geological sites were originally called RIGS (Regionally Important Geological and Geomorphological Sites) which had their origin in "Earth science conservation in Great Britain - A Strategy" published in 1990. In some areas the designation RIGS continues under its original name (e.g. in Dorset, and Greater Manchester), but in Wales RIGS now stands for 'Regionally Important Geodiversity Site', while in other areas the equivalent local geology site is now called a 'County Geology Site' (to correspond to County Wildlife Site, e.g. in Cornwall with matched criteria for CWS and CGS), County Geological Site (e.g. in Devon), County Geodiversity Site (e.g. in Norfolk), Local Geological Sites (e.g. in Staffordshire, Essex and Berkshire) and others. These sites are selected by local groups, such as wildlife trusts, geology trusts, geological societies and local authorities, with the sites being vetted by a Local Sites Partnership involving local government.

=== Ireland ===
In Ireland the term 'county geological site' is used in County Limerick, County Donegal, and others.
