= Griffydam =

Coordinates: 52.762°N 1.389°W

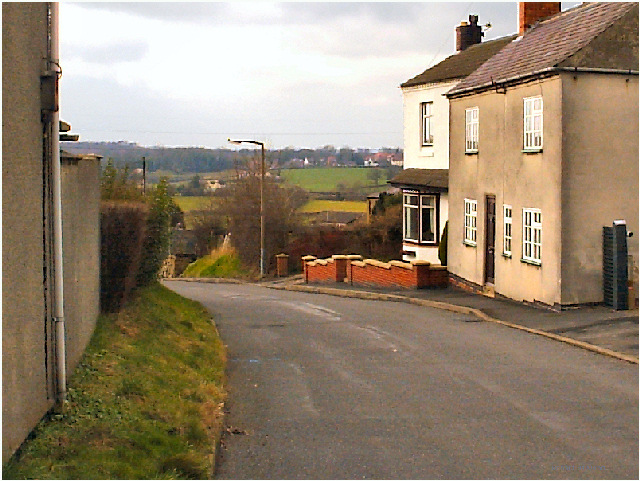
Griffydam in March 2006

Griffydam is a hamlet within the parish of Worthington, Leicestershire.

== History ==
Griffydam is most famously associated with a chalybeate well, or sacred spring, which lies along a path below the main road through the village. According to tradition, the name Griffydam derives from a combination of the terms Griffin (an ancient mythical beast with the body of a lion and the head and wings of an eagle) and Dam, a contained water source. An old local legend tells of how such a creature zealously guarded the well, forcing villagers to walk several miles for their water, until one day it was slain by a chivalrous passing knight.

The placename actually derives from 'Griffith's-Dam'. A man-made pond and remnants of the bank built for this dam can still be seen, below the lane called 'The Tentas'. Several nineteenth century trade directories refer to the settlement as 'Griffith's-Dam'.

The name 'Griffydam' occurs as early as 1764, when it is referred to as being noted for its mineral water, as a place near Ashby-de-la-Zouch. It is also referred to as Griffy-dam in Edmund Gibson's revised (1722) edition of William Camden's "Britannia".

In 1863, it was described as comprising approximately 200 acres (0.81 km^{2}) and belonged to the Earl of Stamford and J Curzon, Esq.

The place is also well known for once having had a popular nightclub called The Traveller's Rest, known to locals as "Travs". Originally a public house, this was converted into a nightspot late in the twentieth century and was finally closed in about 2000, much to the relief of local residents.

== Religion ==
Griffydam has one of the country's earliest Methodist Chapels, built in 1778. It is claimed that before the chapel was built John Wesley came to preach in the village when he was staying with his friend, Selina, Countess of Huntingdon at Castle Donington. It is said that Beaumont, the local squire of Coleorton, decided to disrupt the event by gathering together a band of local men, priming them with ale and arming them with truncheons. The gang-leader was John Massey, a local collier, renowned pugilist and terror of North Leicestershire. Massey is said to have approached the slightly built preacher "savagely", but Wesley continued his sermon. Massey decided to hear a little of what was being said before giving the signal to attack, but the attack never came, for he was converted on the spot.

A Wesleyan Reform Church, opened in 1858, lies alongside the Rempstone Road and is known as 'The Chapel in the Valley'.
