= Geopark Karawanken =

Geological park in Austria and Slovenia

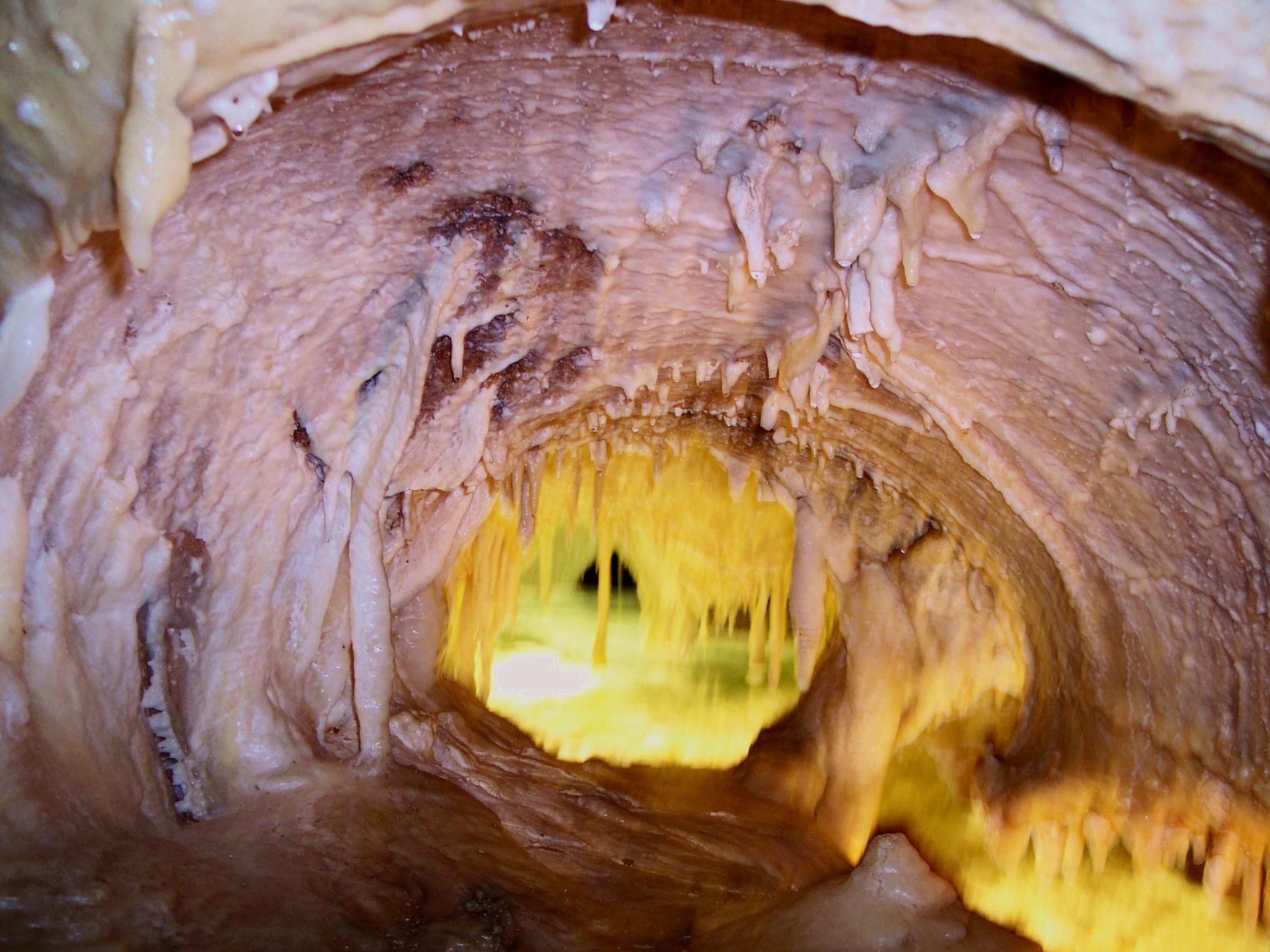
Obir Dripstone Caves

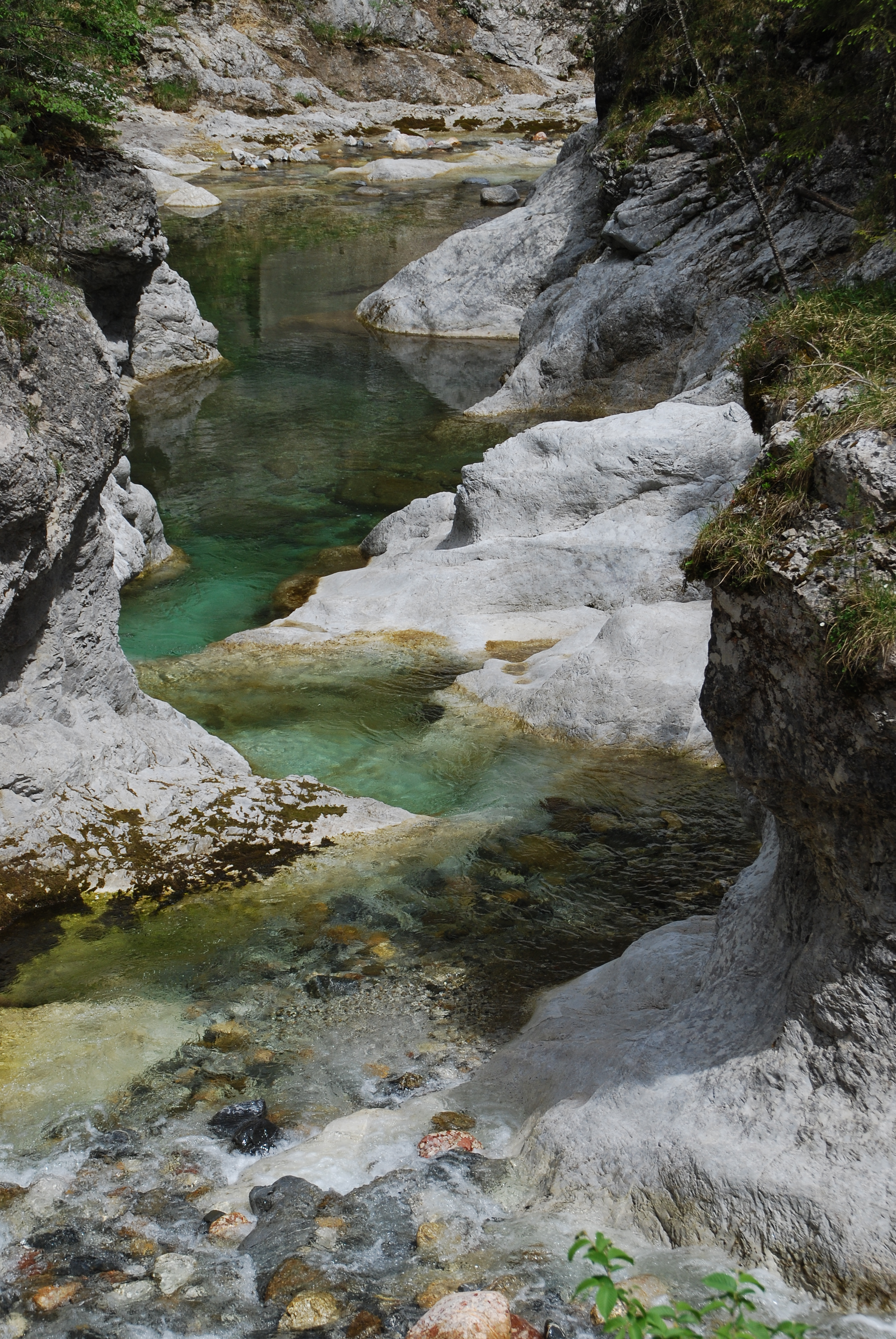
Trögern Gorge

The Geopark Karawanken/Karavanke is located in the Karawanks mountain range in Austria and in Slovenia and comprises an area of 1067 km^{2}. The crossborder geopark has numerous geological and other natural sights and became a member of the UNESCO Global Geoparks Network in 2013.

== Geography and geology ==
On both sides of the border there are in total 14 participating municipalities, namely Bad Eisenkappel, Bleiburg, Črna na Koroškem, Dravograd, Feistritz ob Bleiburg, Gallizien, Globasnitz, Lavamünd, Mežica, Neuhaus, Prevalje, Ravne na Koroškem, Sittersdorf and Zell.

The highest mountain peaks in the geopark are Obir, Petzen and Koschuta. The special geological situation with exceptionally deep valleys results from the contact of several tectonic plates at the Periadriatic Seam.

The area has a rich lead, zinc, iron and coal mining tradition. During the construction of a tunnel, the Obir dripstone caves were discovered. Trögern creek makes its way through an impressive gorge near Bad Eisenkappel. A frequently-visited source of iron-rich water is the Muri Spring.

The mineral wulfenite can be found in the former mine in Mežica that is now used for touristic purposes. In Bad Eisenkappel and in Mežica geopark informations centers have been set up.

== Politics ==
The geopark is an ecotouristic project with an additional aspect of international understanding. The idea goes back to botanist and conservationist Angela Piskernik, who intended to create a transboundary nature park in this region already in the 1960s.
