= Chalybeate Spring, Mittagong =

Mineral spring in New South Wales, Australia

Coordinates: 34°26′55.8″S 150°26′25.0″E

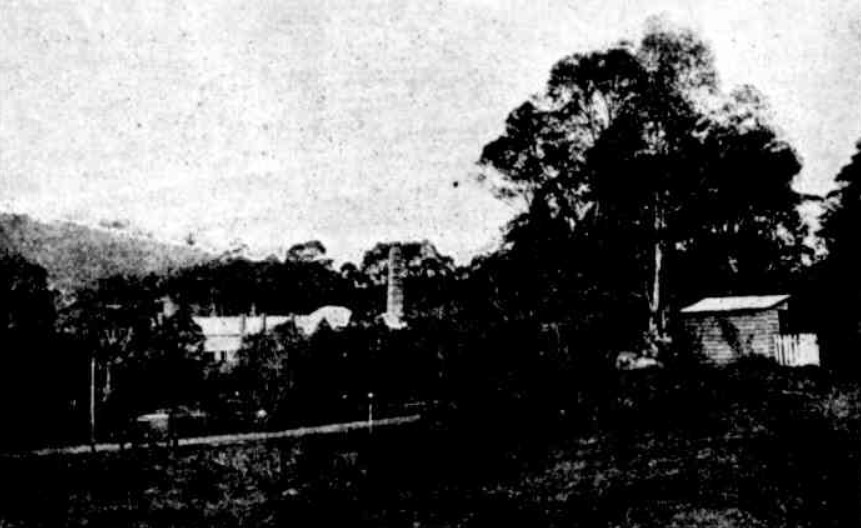
The Chalybeate Spring is within the small enclosure on the right. The (disused) 'Top Works' of Fitzroy Iron Works is in the background and the 'Ironstone Bridge' on the Great South Road (now Old Hume Highway) is in the middle distance. (From the Australian Town and Country Journal, Sat. 1 April 1893, p27).

The Chalybeate Spring at Mittagong, New South Wales, was a perennial, carbonated, chalybeate (iron-rich) mineral spring. The spring was for many years a tourist attraction, mainly during the second half of the 19th century and first few decades of the 20th century. Successive chalybeate springs at Mittagong had, over many thousands of years, created a deposit of iron ore that was mined by the Fitzroy Iron Works, which was closely associated with the early development of the town of Mittagong, in the Southern Highlands of New South Wales, Australia. Although there is still some seepage, close to where it once was, the spring itself has now disappeared.

== Early history ==
=== Aboriginal context ===
The traditional owners of the country around Mittagong are Gandangara people. It is not known if they used the spring as a water source but this small spring, given its strong-tasting water and earthy odour, would be an unlikely water source, with plentiful freshwater nearby. It is almost certain that the limonite in the area surrounding the spring would have been used as ochre pigment.

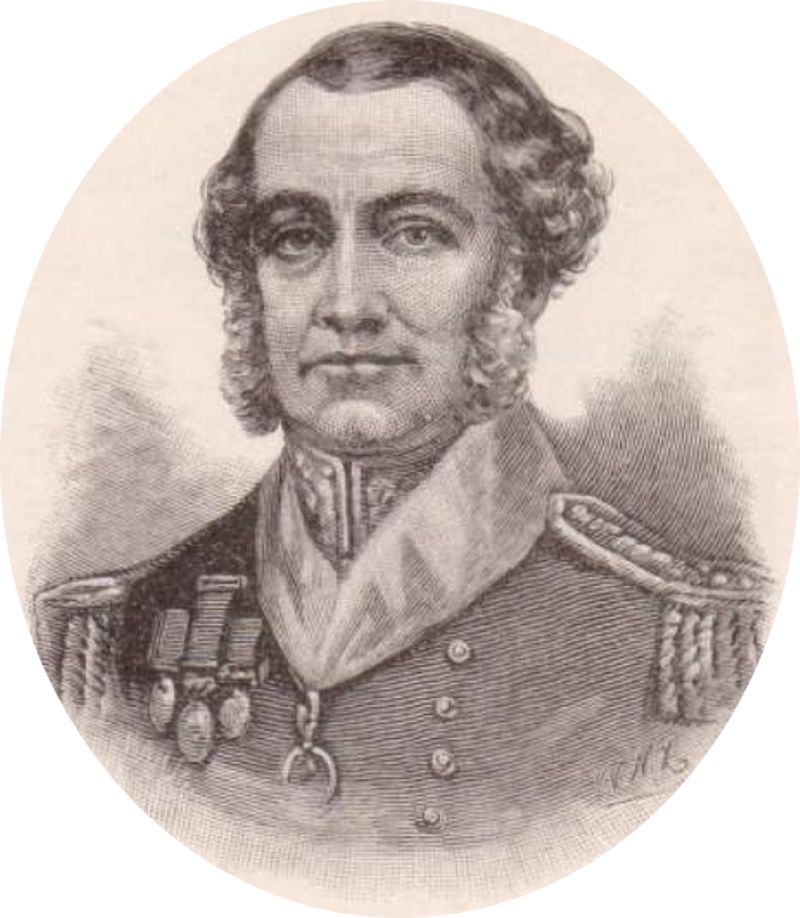
Gov. Charles Augustus FitzRoy

=== Discovery by colonists ===
The discovery of the spring by European colonists does not seem to be recorded but the surveyor Jacques noted the presence of iron ore in the course of realigning the Great South Road (now Old Hume Highway) toward the new town of Berrima in 1833. As the spring lay within the ore deposit, is likely that the spring was first identified around that time.

=== Name ===
During late January 1849, the then Governor of New South Wales, Charles Augustus FitzRoy, visited the spring. He named it 'Lady Mary's Well', after his wife Lady Mary FitzRoy who had been killed in a carriage accident in December 1847 in the Domain of Government House, Parramatta. Over the years, variants of the name involving 'Lady Mary' or 'Lady Fitzroy' were used occasionally but, on the whole, this official name did not stick.

For a time, the spring was thought to be the only chalybeate spring in New South Wales. In fact, there were other chaleabeate springs in the Southern Highlands—near Berrima, Hill Top and Picton—and there were other springs within Mittagong, even in close proximity. The Mittagong spring remained known as 'The Chalybeate Spring' throughout its existence.

== Description ==
The Chalybeate Spring was situated on the top of a grassy knoll on southern side of the Great South Road (now Old Hume Highway) about a quarter of a mile (400m) from the Mittagong railway station.

It was described in 1896 as "no more than a little hole in the ground from which the water oozes up through the crevices among the hematite ore". In later years, the spring-water emerged from a pipe.

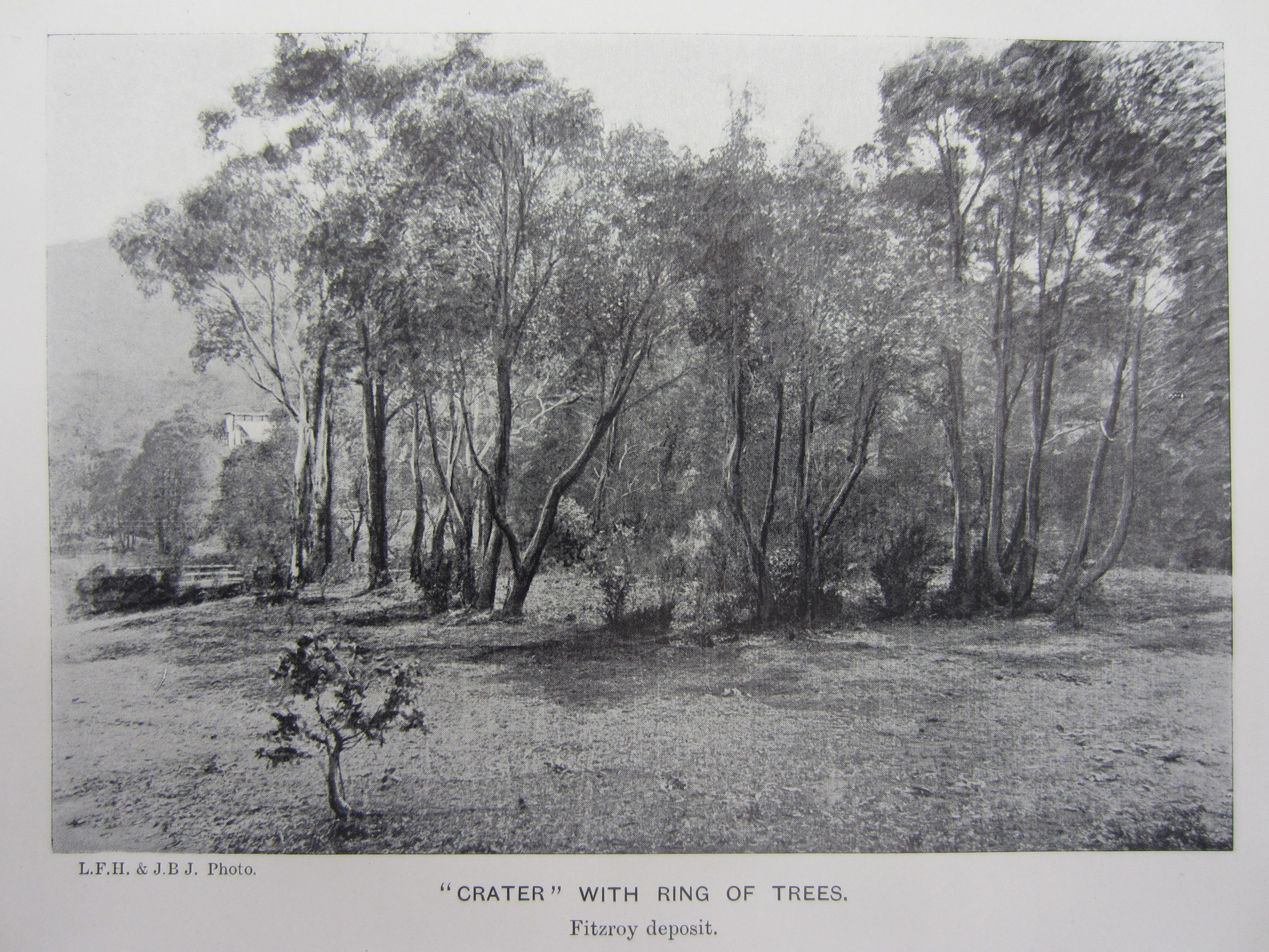
A chalybeate spring, on the Fitzroy Iron Works' iron ore deposit, in its natural state. (J.B. Jaquet, 1901) This is not the 'Chalybeate Spring', as it was already enclosed by 1901. Most likely, one of two other springs noted by Jaquet is shown. Part of the 'Top Works' of the Fitzroy Iron Works is just visible on the left, as is the bridge across Iron Mines Creek. The perspective suggests that the photograph shows the 'Extinct Spring' near 'No.2 Bore' (refer to map below).

Chalybeate springs in the Mittagong area, in their natural state, were described by the Geological Surveyor, J.B. Jaquet, as follows, "They generally issue from centre of saucer-like depressions ("craters") in the top of low mounds ("cones"). The cones are composed of material brought up from below in solution, just as the walls of a volcano are made up lava and ashes, which have issued through the vent. The cones never attain great dimensions. There is always a tendency for the vent to become choked with deposited oxide, and when this occurs the spring seeks a fresh channel and issues from the surface somewhere in the vicinity of the base of the cone. So it happens that the deposits are often composed of a series of cones which, owing to encroachment upon the other, have lost their identity and coalesced together."

The naturally-carbonated, iron-rich water was described as having "an inky taste and an earthy odour". The spring-water ran clear but turned ‘rusty’ in colour after a few hours. It was stated that "The water has considerable medicinal properties, the quantity of iron in solution being so minute as to be readily assimilated by systems needing the tonic effect that iron Imparts."

The flow rate of the spring does not seem to have been directly measured. The spring was described as 'oozing' or 'flowing'. Around 1901, there were three active springs; the largest—presumably the Chalybeate Spring—had an estimated flow rate of 100-gallons/hour (455-litres/hour), with the other two flowing at much lower rates.

== Chemical analysis ==
The analysis of the mineral content of the water (1962) was:

- iron bicarbonate* C_{2}H_{2}FeO_{6} ; 85.5 ppm
- magnesium bicarbonate* Mg(HCO_{3})_{2} ; 32.0 ppm
- calcium bicarbonate* Ca(HCO_{3})_{2} ; 29.1 ppm
- sodium chloride NaCl ; 30.8 ppm
- potassium chloride KCl ; 9.1 ppm
- magnesium chloride MgCl_{2} ; 8.5 ppm

*These compounds exist only in aqueous solution.

The iron content of the spring-water was very high. It was over three times that of the famous Chalybeate Spring at Royal Tunbridge Wells in Kent, England.

== Significance ==
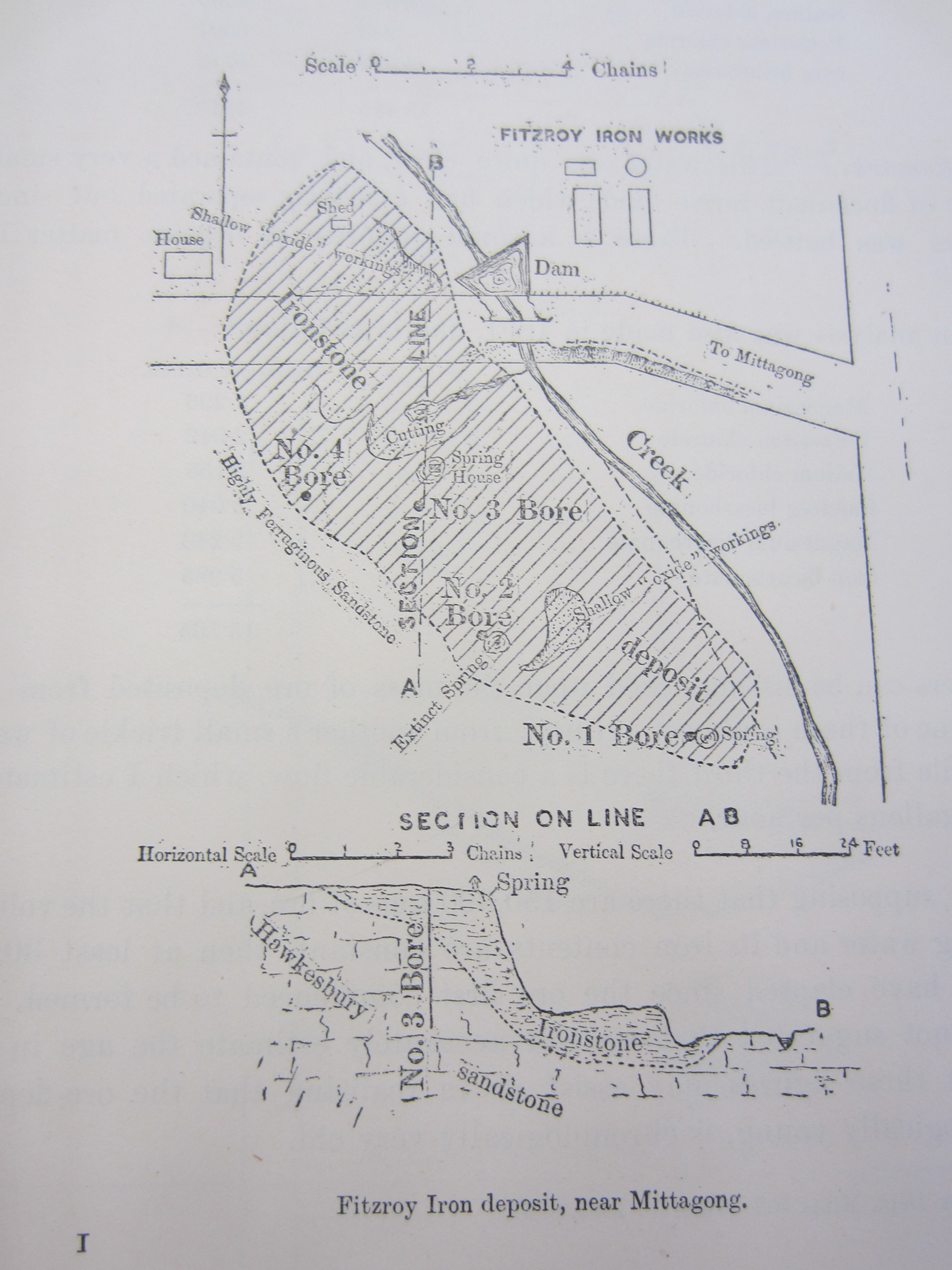
Map and section of the iron ore deposit at Mittagong (J.B, Jacquet, 1901). The "Spring House" is the Chalybeate Spring. The "Fitzroy Iron Works" is the 'top works', with its blast furnace. Ore mining "workings" are shown. The "House" is probably 'Ironstone Cottage', which survives today.

=== Iron ore deposit ===
The spring's water ran clear but turned rusty after a few hours Once the iron-rich water was exposed to the atmosphere and dissolved carbon dioxide was liberated, iron hydroxide precipitated. By this process—over an estimated 30,000 years—chalybeate springs at Mittagong built up a significant deposit of limonite, a type of iron ore.

The ore had grades between 44% and 57% iron. The total resource on the Fitzroy land at Mittagong was estimated at 150,000 tons, part of a total of an estimated 1.5-million tons that was associated with chalybeate springs in the surrounding district.

The Geological Surveyor, J.B. Jaquet, described the ore as follows, "The limonite ore of which the deposits are composed is in part ochreous and powdery, and in part compact. The ochreous ore exists as a superficial coating on the compact variety. It varies in colour from pale yellow to deep red or brown, and is known locally as "oxide". .... The compact variety has a deep brown colour, is slightly vesicular, and frequently contains fragments of roots, stems, and other vegetable remains which have been enclosed during the deposition of the oxide. It also sometimes includes grains of sand."

The iron ore deposit led to the establishment of the Fitzroy Iron Works in 1848. This was the first commercial iron smelting operation in Australia and is widely regarded as the beginning of the iron and steel industry in Australia,

The "oxide" limonite from the Mittagong deposit was also used in the 19th and 20th Centuries to purify town gas by removing noxious Hydrogen Sulphide from the gas.

In March 1941, a shortage of shipping, under wartime conditions, made it sensible to mine local sources of iron ore in New South Wales, rather than rely upon ore carried by sea from South Australia. The Mittagong ore body, although relatively small, lay close to a rail connection to the Port Kembla steelworks and was the closest local deposit to it. Approximately 14,000 tons of ore was mined during 1941, from a location close to the spring.

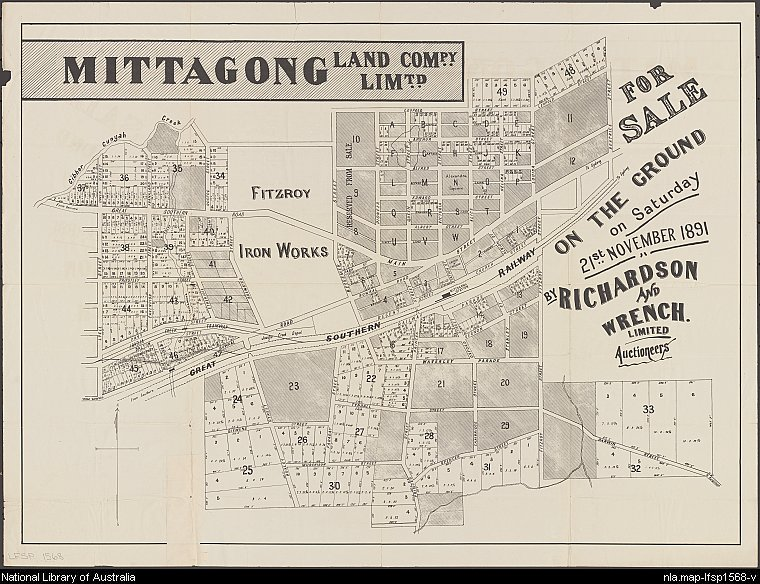
Map of Mittagong in 1891. The area once called 'New Sheffield' is to the right of the Fitzroy Iron Works' land. The iron ore deposit was on the works' land straddling, but mainly south of, the Great South Road.

=== Township of 'New Sheffield' ===
A later incarnation of the Fitzroy Iron Works, when the blast furnace was built in the 1860s, led in turn to the foundation of the township of New Sheffield, one of the small townships that were precursors to Mittagong.

=== Tourist attraction ===
Despite its proximity to the iron ore mine and the Fitzroy Iron Works—until that works closed for the last time on 1 July 1896—the Chaybeate Spring was already an attraction from the mid-19th century onwards.

Around the time of Governor FitzRoy's visit in 1849, there were already moves to exploit the spring and it was reported that "invalids from Sydney and other parts will have the advantage of these waters, combined with an invigorating and cheerful atmosphere". Following Governor Fitz Roy's visit, the water was analysed and advice given that it was best drunk as soon as possible after it emerged from the spring.

While working for the Mittagong Land Company, in 1884, Edward Larkin improved the recreational facilities at the Chalybeate Spring, which lay on the company's land, and added a pipe to allow visitors to more easily obtain its water.

The spring was one of the reasons for the establishment of a railway station at Mittagong. The NSW Railway Tourist's Guide of 1889 (page 26) states that at Mittagong, "There are several chalybeate springs, one of which, near the town, flows into a bricked well, whence it is dispensed to invalids and others".

The water of the spring became well known. A newspaper article in 1909 attested to the popularity of the spring, "The chalybeate springs right in the town are being availed of at all hours of the day. All who partake of the cool, sparkling mineral water are unanimous In their praise of its curative and invigorating properties. Many, indeed, are recommended by their medical advisers to visit the town for the sole purpose of availing themselves of a course at the chalybeate spring."

A newspaper article in 1921 described the facilities at the spring as follows: "The spring has been enclosed. There are summer-houses and seats, and provision made so that invalids taking the waters may rest and picnic, procuring refreshments on the spot. The waters have proved extremely beneficial to visitors, and are daily attracting others from all parts. The local Tourists' Association, recognising Its value, has taken great pains to make the spot comfortable and attractive."

== Decline and disappearance ==
By 1938, mineral springs were no longer fashionable and the Chalybeate Spring at Mittagong had slipped from public consciousness.

The iron ore mine and the Chalybeate Spring had co-existed for many years. The Fitzroy iron ore mining operation had been on a small scale, commensurate with the small capacity and sporadic operation of the 19th-century iron-works. In 1941, iron ore was again mined from a location close to the spring. Despite assurances that the spring would be protected, the mining activity caused the Chalybeate Spring to ‘deviate’ from its pre-war position.

The land on which the Chalybeate Spring flowed had always been privately owned. In 1945, Nattai Shire Council was asked to approve a plan to erect poultry sheds at the site of the spring. In 1948, the spring was "now enclosed in a fowl run." However, in 1962, it was still possible to collect water for a chemical analysis.

By 1986, the land on which the spring lay was owned by the Mittagong RSL Club. In 1986, the club sold the land to the Wingecaribee Shire Council at below commercial rates. The land around the spring was set aside as the Mineral Springs Reserve. A small museum, the Mineral Springs Historical Centre, was built to commemorate the Fitzroy Iron Works.

A visitor to Mittagong in October 1988 noted that, "Next to the RSL Club is the Mineral Springs Historical Centre. In front of the building is a cairn beneath which the "healing" waters of Mittagong's famous Lady Fitzroy mineral spring have been retapped" and that the springwater was "freely available to all, flowing continually from a brass tap."

The Mineral Springs Historical Centre was open for less than a year in 1988. When precisely the spring ceased to exist is unclear.

In 2005–2006, remains of the Fitzroy Iron Works were uncovered prior to the construction of the Highland Marketplace shopping mall. These remains are now preserved within the carpark of the shopping mall. The focus of preservation and commemoration of the iron-works therefore moved to the north side of the Old Hume Highway, perhaps leaving the Mineral Springs Reserve with less justification for its existence.

The Wingecarribie Shire Council's local environmental management plan of 2010 rezoned the Mineral Springs Reserve (Lot 33, DP9299), from 'public open space' to ‘operational land. In 2011, an application was put to the council, which had suffered huge losses on its investments during the 2008 financial crisis, to subdivide the land. On the westernmost lot, the former museum building became the Wingecarribie Aboriginal Community Cultural Centre in July 2012. The other lot was destined to go to the Mittagong RSL Club; it is still vacant land with the appearance of parkland.

== Legacy and remnants ==
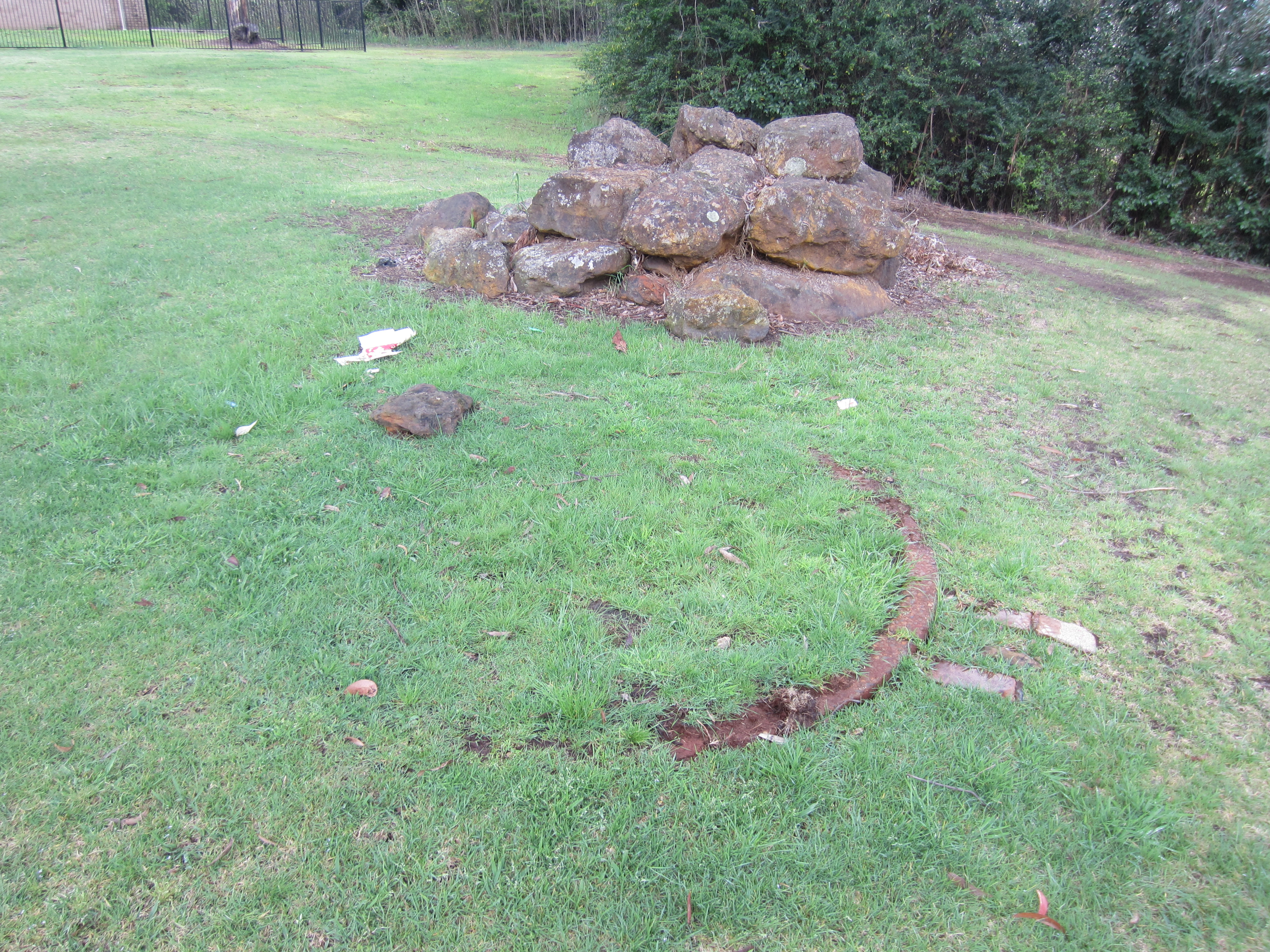
Remnants at the site of the former Mineral Springs Reserve - Oct. 2018.

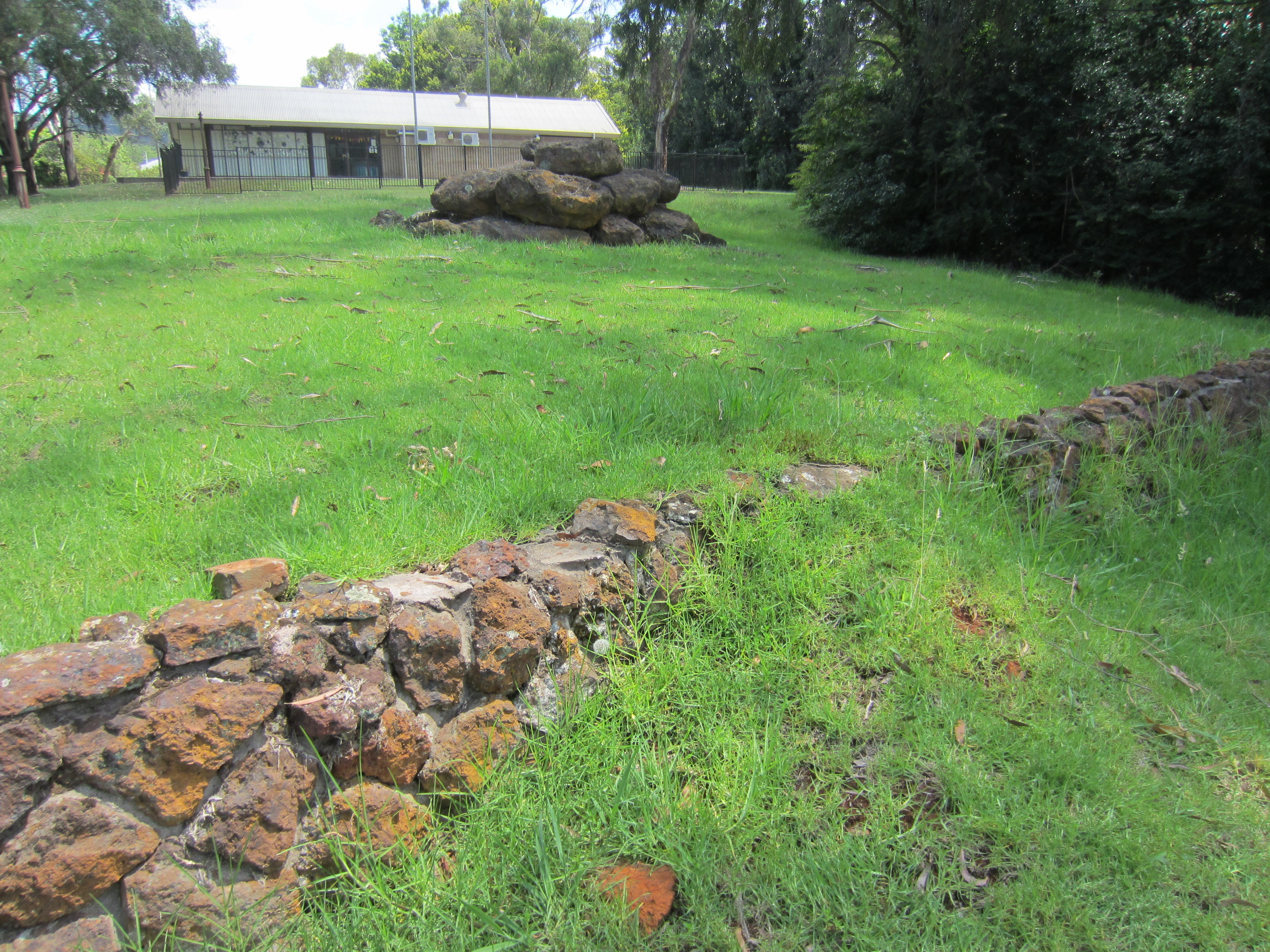
Wet ground and grass-covered iron oxide mound at the site of the former Mineral Springs Reserve – Jan. 2019

There is an interpretive sign with information about the spring and the history of the land, outside the former Mineral Springs Reserve near the entrance to the Mittagong RSL Club from the Old Hume Highway. The name of the nearby Springs Resorts—owned by the Mittagong RSL Club—refers to the old spring,

There is still a significant amount of iron ore—deposited over millennia by chalybeate springs—on the southern side of the Old Hume Highway, at the western end of the former Mineral Springs Reserve and under nearby houses along the Old Hume Highway. Bare patches of the hillside are rust-coloured and ironstone rock outcrops in places.

The Fitzroy Iron Works—built to exploit the iron ore—was important in the development of Mittagong, and left its own legacy and remnants.

A pile of ironstone rocks, some rust-coloured buried concrete, stonework and brickwork, and some vandalised cast-iron lamp-posts—all still present in January 2019, at the top of the hill, in the former Mineral Springs Reserve—are the remnants of the last incarnation of the Chalybeate Spring. The Chalybeate Spring, at least as it was in 1988, no longer exists.

A little further down the hill from the pile of rocks—towards the Old Hume Highway—there is a low retaining wall and a patch of permanently wet ground. Just above the wall an oozing chalybeate source had built a small soggy mound of water-saturated iron oxide that is covered in lush grass, by 2019. It may be all that remains of the once renowned Chalybeate Spring.

== See also ==
- Mineral spring
- Chalybeate
- Fitzroy Iron Works
