= Zell, Carinthia =

Zell Sele
- Municipality
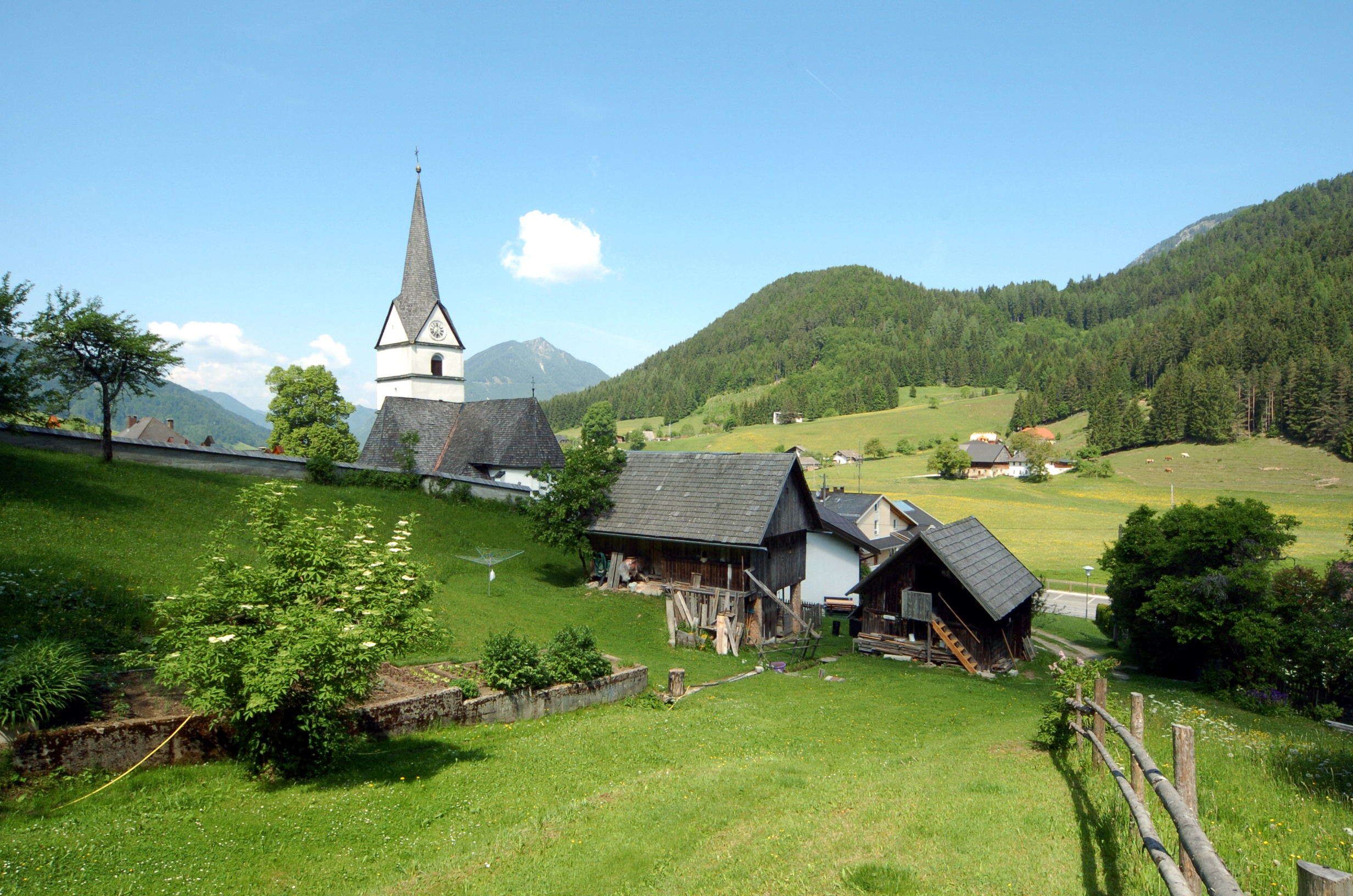

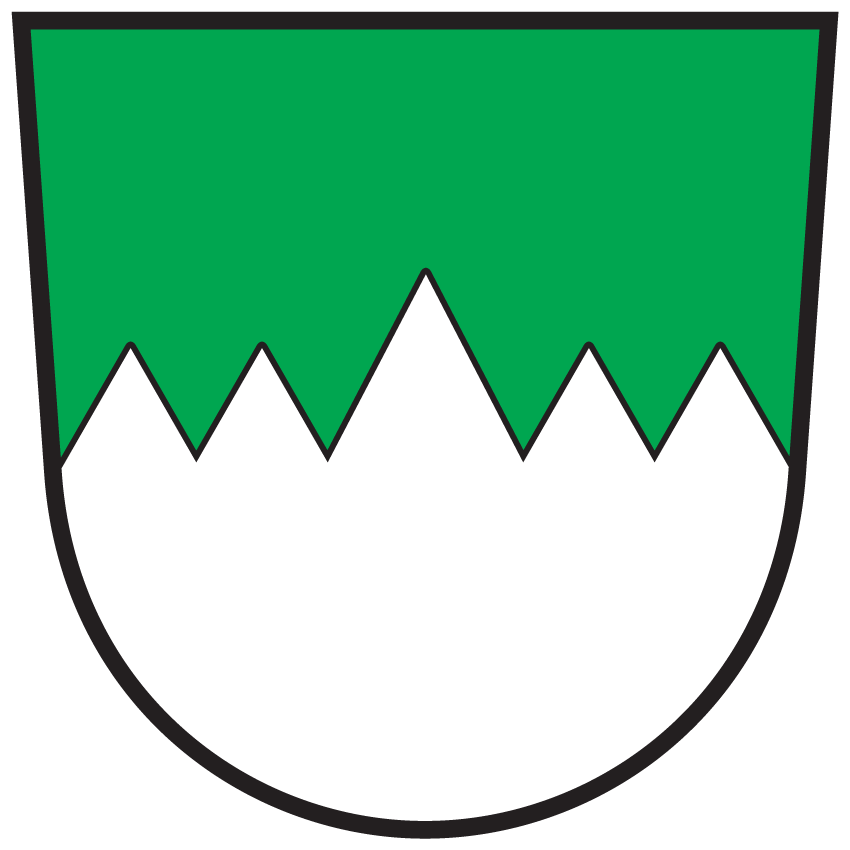
- Coat of arms

- Location within Austria Zell (Austria)
- Coordinates: 46°28′N 14°23′E
- Country: Austria
- State: Carinthia
- District: Klagenfurt-Land

Government
  - Mayor: Engelbert Wassner (SPÖ)

Area
  - Total: 75.3 km^{2} (29.1 sq mi)
- Elevation: 948 m (3,110 ft)

Population (2018-01-01)
  - Total: 609
  - Density: 8.09/km^{2} (20.9/sq mi)
- Time zone: UTC+1 (CET)
  - Summer (DST): UTC+2 (CEST)
- Postal code: 9170
- Area code: 04227
- Website: www.zell-sele.at

Zell (Slovene: Sele) is a municipality in the district of Klagenfurt-Land in the Austrian state of Carinthia. 89.1% of the population are Slovenes.

== Geography ==
Zell lies in a side valley on the north of the Karawank on the Slovenian border about 20 km south of Klagenfurt and 6 km south of Ferlach.

== Population ==
According to the 2001 census, 89.1% of the inhabitants are of Carinthian Slovenian descent, which is the highest percentage of all municipalities in the state of Carinthia.

The commune is situated southwest of the town of Ferlach, on the northern slope of the Koschuta Massif within the Karawanks mountain range. The place was first mentioned as Cel in a 1280 deed. It consists of six villages:

Village (German)	Village (Slovenian)	Number of people 1991	Percent of Slovenes 1991	Percent of Slovenes 1951
Zell Freibach	Sele Borovnica	187	92.5%	96.9%
Zell Homölisch	Sele Hmelše	23	47.8%	76.3%
Zell Mitterwinkel	Sele Srednji Kot	98	98%	95.7%
Zell Oberwinkel	Sele Zvrhnji Kot	91	96.7%	97.1%
Zell Pfarre	Sele Fara	235	93.2%	92.1%
Zell Schaida	Sele Šajda	100	99%	91.7%

== Politics ==
Seats in the municipal council (2003 elections):

- SPÖ: 6
- Enotna lista: 4
- ÖVP: 1
