= Maionia, Lydia =

Historical city

Coordinates: 38°32′07″N 28°29′29″E

Maionia or Maeonia (Ancient Greek: Μαιονία), was a city of the Hellenistic, Roman and Byzantine era located near the Hermos River, in ancient Lydia, one of the kingdoms of Asia Minor. Both Ramsay and Talbert tentatively identified the ancient polis with the modern village of Kula (Turkish for fortress) a village known for its carpet manufacture.

The town is mentioned by Pliny the Elder, Hierocles, and in the Notitiae Episcopatuum. Several coins from Maionia exist. In antiquity the city was part of the Katakekaumene Decapolis of towns. Once the seat of a residential bishop, it remains a titular see of the Roman Catholic Church.

Its site is located near Menye in Asiatic Turkey.
