= List of UNESCO Global Geoparks in Europe =

Europe (Note: The list of geoparks in this article presents the members of the European Geoparks Network. Some members, like in the Canary Islands or in Turkey are situated outside Europe from a physical geographical viewpoint.) is the cradle of the geoparks movement. The European Geoparks Network is a founding member of the Global Geoparks Network and it functions as a regional geopark network of it. As of November 2022, there are 94 UNESCO Global Geoparks in 28 European countries and there are several territories in an aspiring or planned phase, or in a national geopark status. Further elements of the geodiversity of the continent is represented on the World Heritage list, under criterion VIII or VII.

== UNESCO Global Geoparks ==
UNESCO Global Geopark	country	Image	Location	Area (km^{2})	Year	References
Haute-Provence	France		Provence-Alpes-Côte d'Azur; 44°06′31″N 6°17′13″E	2300	2000	
Vulkaneifel	Germany		Rhineland-Palatinate; 50°12′24″N 6°50′10″E	1220	2000	
Lesvos Island	Greece		North Aegean; 39°12′42″N 25°51′18″E	1636	2000	
Psiloritis	Greece		Crete; 35°17′32″N 24°52′53″E	1159	2001	
TERRA.vita	Germany		Lower Saxony, North Rhine-Westphaila; 52°16′00″N 8°03′00″E	1560	2001	
Copper Coast	Ireland		Munster; 52°08′19″N 7°20′32″W	50	2001	
Cuilcagh Lakelands	Ireland, United Kingdom		Ulster; 54°15′31″N 7°30′53″W	180	2001	
Madonie	Italy		Sicily; 37°52′00″N 14°04′44″E	400	2004	
Rocca di Cerere	Italy		Sicily; 37°30′53″N 14°22′41″E	1298	2008	
Steirische Eisenwurzen	Austria		Styria; 47°04′12″N 15°29′27″E	586	2004	
Bergstrasse-Odenwald	Germany		Hesse, Bavaria, Baden-Württemberg; 49°32′11″N 8°34′07″E	3500	2004	
North Pennines	United Kingdom		North East England; 54°47′17″N 2°25′01″W	1938	2004	
Luberon	France		Provence-Alpes-Côte d'Azur; 43°52′31″N 5°26′08″E	1953	2004	
North-West Highlands	United Kingdom		Scottish Highlands; 58°08′09″N 5°15′05″W	2100	2004	
Swabian Albs	Germany		Baden-Württemberg; 48°31′00″N 9°24′15″E	6688	2004	
Harz - Braunschweiger Land - Ostfalen	Germany		Lower Saxony, Thuringia, Saxony-Anhalt; 52°16′05″N 10°49′57″E	11500	2004	
Hateg Country Dinosaurs	Romania		Hunedoara; 45°36′27″N 23°22′44″E	1024	2005	
Beigua	Italy		Liguria; 44°25′40″N 8°35′12″E	392	2005	
Fforest Fawr	United Kingdom		Wales; 51°55′51″N 3°24′21″W	763	2005	
Bohemian Paradise	Czechia		Central Bohemia, Hrádec Králove; 50°35′50″N 15°07′02″E	742	2005	
Cabo de Gata – Níjar	Spain		Andalusia; 36°47′22″N 2°14′14″W	500	2006	
Naturtejo de Meseta Meridional	Portugal		Centro; 39°48′16″N 7°29′34″W	4624.4	2006	
Sierras Subbéticas	Spain		Andalusia; 37°14′52″N 4°18′24″W	320	2006	
Sobrarbe-Pirineos	Spain		Aragon; 42°22′07″N 0°10′13″E	2202	2006	
Gea Norvegica	Norway		Telemark, Vestfold; 59°08′12″N 9°59′51″E	3000	2006	
Papuk	Croatia		Požega-Slavonia; 45°27′25″N 17°39′38″E	524	2007	
English Riviera	United Kingdom		Devon; 50°27′22″N 3°33′15″W	104	2007	
Adamello-Brenta	Italy		Trentino; 46°07′09″N 10°45′08″E	1188	2008	
GeoMôn	United Kingdom		Wales; 53°16′08″N 4°20′03″W	1800	2009	
Arouca	Portugal		Norte; 40°55′56″N 8°14′42″W	327	2009	
Shetland	United Kingdom		Scotland; 60°33′36″N 1°05′55″W	1468	2009	
Chelmos – Vouraikos	Greece		Achaea; 38°08′47″N 22°10′18″E	647	2009	
Novohrad – Nograd	Hungary, Slovakia		Nógrád, Banská Bystrica; 48°09′58″N 19°48′55″E	1587	2010	
Magma	Norway		Vestlandet, Sørlandet; 58°26′50″N 6°03′08″E	3000	2006	
Basque Coast	Spain		Basque Country; 43°17′45″N 2°21′16″W	89	2010	
Cilento e Vallo di Diano	Italy		Campania; 40°16′50″N 15°22′21″E	1841	2010	
Rokua	Finland		Oulu; 64°34′43″N 26°30′06″E	1326	2010	
Tuscan Mining Park	Italy		Tuscany; 42°57′17″N 10°50′32″E	1087	2010	
Vikos – Aoos	Greece		Western Macedonia, Epirus; 40°01′02″N 20°42′43″E	1200	2010	
Muskau Arch	Germany, Poland		Brandenburg, Saxony, Lubusz; 51°34′13″N 14°43′35″E	578.8	2011	
Sierra Norte de Sevilla	Spain		Andalusia; 37°42′44″N 5°38′04″W	1774.84	2011	
Burren and Cliffs of Moher	Ireland		Clare; 52°59′47″N 9°23′21″W	530	2011	
Katla	Iceland		South Constituency; 63°37′50″N 19°37′16″W	9542	2011	
Massif des Bauges	France		Auvergne-Rhone-Alpes; 45°41′15″N 6°06′21″E	856	2011	
Apuan Alps	Italy		Tuscany; 44°02′28″N 10°22′03″E	494	2011	
Villuercas-Ibores-Jara	Spain		Extremadura; 39°27′07″N 5°19′39″W	2544.4	2011	
Chablais	France		Auvergne-Rhone-Alpes; 46°20′53″N 6°35′26″E	872	2012	
Central Catalunya	Spain		Catalonia; 42°28′00″N 1°49′18″E	1300	2012	
Bakony-Balaton	Hungary		Veszprém; 46°58′35″N 17°55′43″E	3244	2012	
Azores	Portugal		Azores; 37°44′28″N 25°40′32″W	12884	2013	
Karavanke/Karawanken	Austria, Slovenia		Styria, Upper Carniola; 46°30′15″N 14°46′21″E	1067	2013	
Idrija	Slovenia		Gorizia; 46°00′03″N 14°01′12″E	294	2013	
Hondsrug	Netherlands		Drenthe; 52°55′50″N 6°49′31″E	1000	2013	
Sesia - Val Grande	Italy		Piedmont; 45°59′28″N 8°20′36″E	2023	2013	
Kula Volcanic	Turkey		Aegean Region; 38°36′34″N 28°28′31″E	300	2013	
Molina and Alto Tajo	Spain		Castile-La Mancha; 39°16′46″N 3°05′52″W	4520	2014	
El Hierro	Spain		Canary Islands; 27°43′32″N 18°01′27″W	595	2014	
Monts d’Ardèche	France		Auvergne-Rhone-Alpes; 44°38′06″N 4°15′34″E	2280	2014	
Erz der Alpen	Austria		Salzburg; 47°22′12″N 13°12′00″E	211	2014	
Odsherred	Denmark		Sjælland; 55°49′48″N 11°34′48″E	355	2014	
Terras de Cavaleiros	Portugal		Norte; 41°32′24″N 6°58′12″W	700	2014	
Lanzarote and Chinijo Islands	Spain		Canary Islands; 29°03′00″N 13°36′00″W	2500	2015	
Reykjanes	Iceland		Southern Peninsula; 63°58′23″N 22°31′00″W	825	2015	
Pollino	Italy		Basilicata, Calabria; 39°55′52″N 16°07′34″E	1925	2015	
Sitia	Greece		Crete; 35°10′01″N 26°07′00″E	517	2015	
Troodos	Cyprus		Limassol; 34°58′49″N 32°50′46″E	1147	2015	
Causses du Quercy	France		Occitanie; 44°34′19″N 1°41′11″E	1855	2017	
Las Loras	Spain		Castile and León; 42°30′58″N 4°00′38″W	950.76	2017	
Beaujolais	France		Auvergne-Rhone-Alpes; 48°31′18″N 64°13′02″W	1550	2018	
Famenne-Ardenne	Belgium		Wallonia; 48°31′18″N 64°13′02″W	915	2018	
Conca de Tremp–Montsec	Spain		Catalonia; 42°10′00″N 0°53′45″E	2050	2018	
Courel Mountain	Spain		Galicia; 48°31′18″N 64°13′02″W	577.85	2019	
Vis Archipelago	Croatia		Split-Dalmatia; 43°02′44″N 16°05′31″E	6661	2019	
Trollfjell	Norway		Trøndelag; 65°28′21″N 12°12′30″E	10082	2019	
Lauhanvuori-Haemeenkangas	Finland				2020	
Estrela	Portugal				2020	
Yangan-Tau	Russia		Salavatsky District; 55°16′27″N 58°08′05″E	1774	2020	
Djerdap	Serbia		44°27′17″N 22°09′25″E	1330	2020	
Granada	Spain				2020	
Maestrazgo	Spain				2020	
The Black Country	United Kingdom				2020	
Vestjylland	Denmark		West Jutland; 56°24′36″N 8°26′21″E	4,759	2021	
Saimaa	Finland				2021	
Salpausselkä	Finland				2022	
Thuringia Inselsberg – Drei Gleichen	Germany		Thuringia; 50°52′N 10°34′E	725	2021	
Buzău Land	Romania		Buzău County; 45°22′N 26°33′E	1035.9	2022	
Ries	Germany		Southern Germany; 48°51′N 10°29′E	1749	2022	
Sydfynske Øhav	Denmark		South Funen Archipelago; 54°57′26″N 10°32′14″E	2,733	2024	
Impact Crater Lake – Lappajärvi	Finland				2024	
Toratau	Russia		Ishimbaysky District; 53°33′14″N 56°05′56″E	3305	2025	

Note *Kula Volcanic Geopark was enlarged and renamed as Kula Salihli Geopark in 2020. Though it is in the Asian part of Turkey, it is included here as the European Geopark Network extends across all of Turkey.

== Recognition of Europe's geodiversity under different international frameworks ==
=== World Heritage sites ===
Twenty-eight sites are represented currently on the World Heritage list under criterion VIII, as an outstanding representative of Earth's history:

- Pirin National Park (Bulgaria)
- Plitvice Lakes National Park (Croatia)
- Ilulissat Icefjord (Greenland, Denmark)
- Wadden Sea (Denmark, Germany, Netherlands)
- Stevns Klint (Denmark)
- High Coast / Kvarken Archipelago (Finland, Sweden)
- Gulf of Porto: Calanche of Piana, Gulf of Girolata, Scandola Reserve (France)
- Pyrénées - Mont Perdu (France, Spain)
- Chaîne des Puys - Limagne fault tectonic arena (France)
- Messel Pit Fossil Site (Germany)
- Caves of Aggtelek Karst and Slovak Karst (Hungary, Slovakia)
- Vatnajökull National Park - Dynamic Nature of Fire and Ice (Iceland)
- Isole Eolie (Aeolian Islands) (Italy)
- Monte San Giorgio (Italy, Switzerland)
- The Dolomites (Italy)
- Mount Etna (Italy)
- Durmitor National Park (Montenegro)
- West Norwegian Fjords – Geirangerfjord and Nærøyfjord (Norway)
- Lake Baikal (Russia)
- Volcanoes of Kamchatka (Russia)
- Lena Pillars Nature Park (Russia)
- Škocjan Caves (Slovenia)
- Teide National Park (Spain)
- Laponian Area (Sweden)
- Swiss Alps Jungfrau-Aletsch (Switzerland)
- Swiss Tectonic Arena Sardona (Switzerland)
- Giant's Causeway and Causeway Coast (United Kingdom)
- Dorset and East Devon Coast (United Kingdom)

Further sites are inscribed under criterion VII of superlative natural phenomena and aesthetic importance. Some of them, which have a special geoheritage importance are:

- Natural and Cultural Heritage of the Ohrid region (Albania, North Macedonia)
- Lagoons of New Caledonia: Reef Diversity and Associated Ecosystems (France)
- Pitons, cirques and remparts of Reunion Island (France)
- French Austral Lands and Seas (France)
- Meteora (Greece)
- Mount Athos (Greece)
- Danube Delta (Romania)
- Putorana Plateau (Russia)
- Göreme National Park and the Rock Sites of Cappadocia (Turkey)
- Hierapolis-Pamukkale (Turkey)
- St Kilda (United Kingdom)
- Gough and Inaccessible Islands (United Kingdom)
