= Battle of Orchomenus =

Battle between the Roman Republic and the Kingdom of Pontus

Coordinates: 38.48°N 22.98°E

- Part of the First Mithridatic War
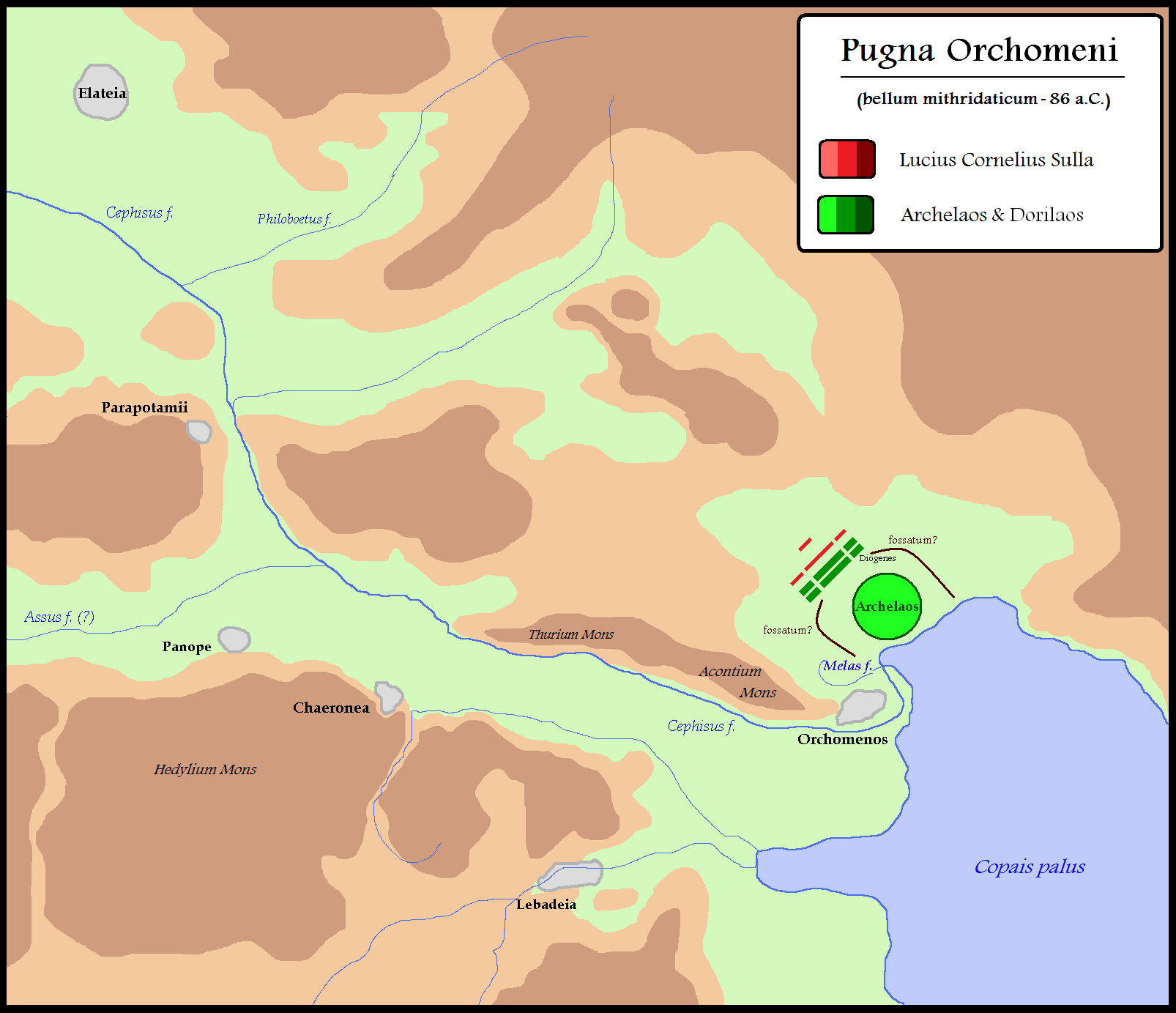
| Date | Autumn 86 BC |
| Location | Orchomenus, Boeotia (modern Greece) |
| Result | Roman victory |

Belligerents
| Roman Republic | Pontus |

Commanders and leaders
| Lucius Cornelius Sulla | Archelaus; Dorylaeus |

Strength
| 30,000 | 75,000–80,000 |

Casualties and losses
| about 100 | Heavy, suggested some 15,000 |

The Battle of Orchomenus was fought in autumn 86 BC between Rome and the forces of Mithridates VI of Pontus. The Roman army was led by Lucius Cornelius Sulla, while Mithridates' army was led by Archelaus. The Roman force was victorious, and Archelaus later defected to Rome. The battle ended the Mithridatic invasion of Europe. Information on the battle is included in Plutarch's Life of Sulla, chapters 20–21.

== Background ==
After his victory over Archelaus at Chaeronea, Sulla set out for Thessaly to meet the consul Lucius Valerius Flaccus coming from Italy (although Sulla was unaware he had been sent to attack him, not to join with him). On the way, he heard reports that Dorylaeus had landed at Chalcis with a sizeable fleet transporting eighty thousand of Mithridates' best troops to reinforce Archelaus. Dorylaeus wanted to tempt Sulla to fight as soon as possible, and Sulla cooperated by abruptly turning around to meet this new threat. After a skirmish with Sulla's troops, Dorylaeus began to rethink the idea of giving battle and instead promoted a strategy designed to wear the enemy down. On the other hand, Archelaus' confidence was raised by the flat terrain around their camp at Orchomenus, which favoured their superior cavalry.

== Battle ==
While Archelaus let his men relax after taking their positions, Sulla set his men to work building trenches and ditches which he hoped would cut off Archelaus' cavalry from the plains and move the fighting to more boggy areas. Archelaus recognized Sulla's strategy, and launched several attacks on the soldiers digging the trenches and ditches. Sulla's men began to panic and break for the safety of camp. Sulla saved his army by making his stand on the earthworks and bellowing to his wavering troops: "Orchomenos! Remember the name. I'm ready to fight and die here. When people ask you where you ran away and left your general, tell them: at Orchomenos!" This caused his troops to rally and repulse the attack. In one of these attacks, Archelaus' stepson, Diogenes, distinguished himself in a valiant attack where he died gloriously.

For his final attack, Archelaus led out his troops in a more formal battle array. Archelaus had his scythed chariots to the front followed by his Macedonian style phalanx, then came his auxiliaries. The cavalry was massed at the flanks, though their effectiveness was limited by Sulla's earthworks. Sulla had his army arranged in three lines, though there were spaces between the files through which light infantry, and even cavalry could rush. His front line was denser than the troops formed up in the back. The reason for this peculiar formation became apparent when the scythed chariots attacked. The Roman front ranks opened up and stepped backwards and revealed serried ranks of stakes driven into the ground at an angle to point outwards. Some chariots were impaled on Sulla's stakes and the rest brought down by the hail of Roman pilum. The surviving chariots in their panicked flight crashed through their own phalanx, creating chaos among its ranks.

Sulla took maximum advantage of the confusion by ordering a general advance. Archelaus tried to save his phalanx by charging the Romans with his cavalry, to buy time for his pikemen to reform. Sulla had foreseen this move and charged the Pontic horsemen with his own vastly outnumbered cavalry. The Roman horse succeeded in spoiling the Pontic cavalry charge and they were soon joined by the advancing legionaries. Having repulsed the Pontic horse the Romans then charged the still re-forming phalanx, which promptly panicked and ran.

After winning the battle Sulla advanced on the Pontic camp and started to besiege it. The Romans were able to pull down a section of the ramparts; led by a junior officer called Basilus, Roman legionaries poured into the camp. In the close quarters of the enemy camp the Roman legionaries with their short stabbing swords had a distinct advantage. Trapped against the marsh the Pontic soldiers had nowhere to run and were massacred.

== Aftermath ==
Sulla decorated Basilus in appreciation of his courage during the storming of Archelaus' camp. He then went on to punish Boeotia for its treachery; he destroyed three Boeotian towns: Anthedon, Darymna, and Halae. Later, upon meeting fishermen from Halae who gave him fish, Sulla told them he was surprised there were any of them left, but let them go and told them not to worry. As a result of this incident, the people of Halae were inspired to repopulate their town.

While Sulla was away fighting Mithridates, Rome was suffering from civil disorder at the hands of the two consuls of 85 BC, Lucius Cornelius Cinna and Gnaeus Papirius Carbo, prompting eminent members of Roman society to flee to Sulla's camp, including his wife Metella and their children. Sulla tried to use his victory at the Battle of Orchomenus to bring about peace with Mithridates so that he could return home, and though Sulla's peace terms were not immediately accepted, Archelaus eventually managed to broker a peace between Sulla and Mithridates. After Gaius Flavius Fimbria's troops defected to Sulla (originally the troops of Flaccus, who Fimbria had led a revolt against), Fimbria committed suicide and Sulla was able to wrap up his affairs in Greece and Asia Minor, and return to Italy.
