= Kula-Salihli Geopark =

Geopark in Manisa, Turkey

Kula-Salihli Geopark Kula-Salihli Jeoparkı
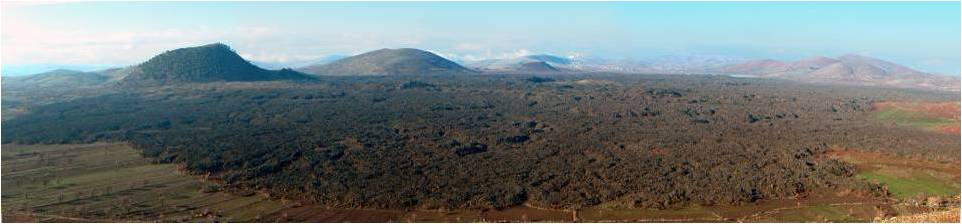
- Panoramic view of Kula Geopark.

- Location within Turkey
- Location: Salihli-Kula, Manisa, Turkey
- Coordinates: 38°35′47″N 28°39′45″E, Manisa Province
- Area: 300 km^{2} (120 sq mi)
- Elevation: 200–600 m (660–1,970 ft)
- Established: 2013
- Website: kulasalihligeopark.com

Kula-Salihli Geopark, also known as Kula Volcanic Geopark and Kula Geopark, (Turkish: Kula Volkanik Jeoparkı or Kula Jeoparkı) is a geopark, a protected area of geological heritage, located in Kula and Salihli districts of Manisa Province, western Turkey. It was recognized by UNESCO as a UNESCO Global Geopark in 2013, and is the country's only geopark.

== Location ==
The volcanic park is located in Manisa Province in western Turkey, covering an area of nearly 300 km^{2} (120 sq mi) mainly in Kula district, and stretches in the north into parts of Salihli district. The elevation of the area rises from 200 m (660 ft) in Salihli to 600 m (2,000 ft) in Kula.

== History ==
The volcanic field was first described by the Ancient Greek geographer Strabo (64 or 63 BC – c. 24 AD) in the encyclopedia Geographica, calling it Katakekaumene. The name means "burnt land" or "burnt country", and refers to the pitch-black color of the lava in the dormant volcanic field Kula. The volcanic field attracted many travelers and researchers, including George Keppel (1830), William Hamilton and Hugh Edwin Strickland (1841), Charles Texier, Bresh and Anton von Premerstein (1891), Henry Stephens Washington (1900) and Alfred Philippson (1914).

== Geopark ==
In November 2011, an application was made to the European Geoparks Network and UNESCO. Kula Geopark became Turkey's first geopark candidate of European Geoparks Network and UNESCO in March 2013. In September 2013, it was accepted as the country's first and only geopark by the European and the UNESCO-assisted Global Geoparks Network.

In addition to its geological wonders, the geopark encompasses the historical footprints of human habitation and traditional Kula Ottoman houses, bridging the gap between Earth history and human culture.

In June 2013, the geopark was opened to tourism after construction of facilities including walkways and a visitor center. The more than 12 km (7.5 mi) long trails equipped with information panels connect the most interesting geosites in the geopark. The visitor center is an information center for tourists and a natural history museum for education in geology.

== Geology ==
The geological structure of the geopark is of a complex nature and is caused by the active tectonics of the Aegean region. It is one of the geologically youngest volcanic fields in Turkey. Three phases of eruption took place in the volcanism of the Quaternary period, some 1.1 million, 300 thousand and 15 thousand years ago.

=== Cones and craters ===
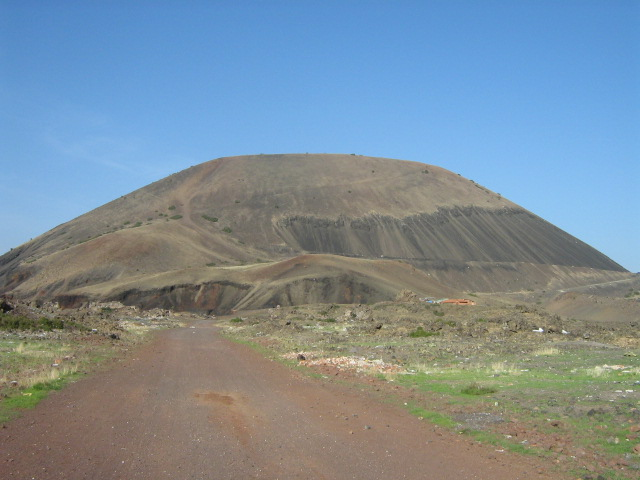
A scoria cone in Kula Geopark

There are 80 scoria cones and five maars in the geopark. The height of the small-sized scoria cones does not exceed 150 m (490 ft).

=== Lava caves and lava tubes ===
Lava tubes or caves were formed by lava flow along its way. Lava tubes are formed when an active low-viscosity lava flow solidifies and forms a hard crust roof above the still-flowing lava stream. While some lava caves are easily accessible, others can be entered only with specialized caving equipment.

=== Basalt columns ===
Characteristic basalt columns, called "Burgaz volcanics" (tower volcanics) are formed in the first stage of lava flow. When thick lava flow cools rapidly, contraction forces build up. While shrinking in the vertical direction does not form fractures, a network of fractures formed by horizontal shrinkage develop basalt columns. Basalt columns in the villages Sarnıç and Çakırca are higher than 20 m (66 ft).

=== Hoodoos ===
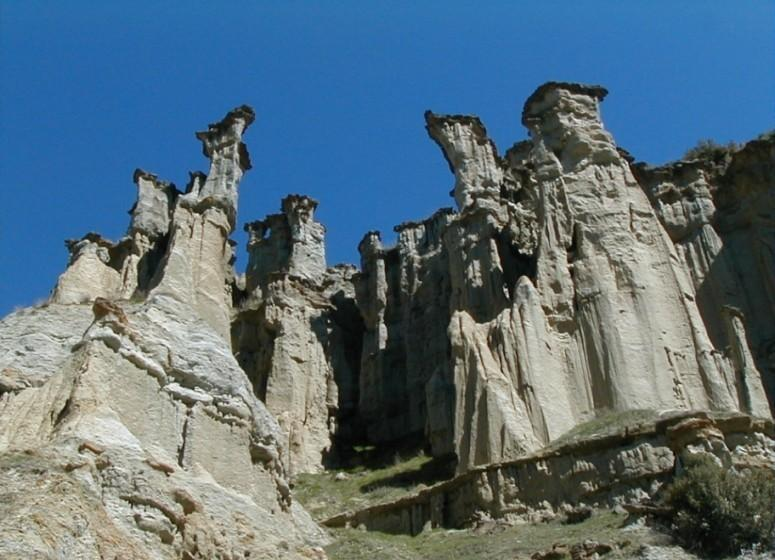
Hoodoos in Kula Geopark

There are hoodoos situated on the İzmir-Ankara state highway D300/E96 near Yurtbaşı village.These geological structures, known locally as 'Kuladokya', are formed through different types of erosion. A strong outer layer of rock protects the weaker, more fragile volcanic rock underneath from being worn away by wind and water. This creates tall, chimney-like formations

=== Prehistoric footprints ===
In 1954, during road construction works near the Çakallar Volcanic Cone, more than 200 fossilized footprints were unearthed. Only a few of these footprints remain on the scene. It is considered that the footprints belong to three people walking on a slope. The age analyses indicate that the footprints are 10,000–12,000 years old corresponding to the Mesolithic Anatolia. These traces, which bear witness to one of the oldest interactions of humans and active volcanoes in Anatolia, are very important for scientific and educational reasons.
