= Axiotta =

Ancient city in Asia Minor

Axiotta (Ancient Greek: Αξίοττα) or Aziotta (Ancient Greek: Αζίοττα) was an ancient Greek city in Lydia, in Asia Minor and it was a place of worship of the Phrygian god Men.

The city was located in the valley of river Ermos and it became known from inscriptions found in the area, several of them dedicated to the main deity of the city Men ("to Mina Axiottino" / "Μήνα Αξιοττηνό").

Indicatively:

Μηνί Αξιοττηνώ Αφφιάς Γλύκωνος εύξατο, ει τεκνώσει...
To Meni of Axiotta, Affias [of] Glycon wished, that if she will have a child...

The ethnic name for people from Axiotta / Aziotta was Axiottinos (Αξιοττηνός) or Aziotinos (Αζιοττηνός) ("μήτηρ Αζιοττηνή" / "mother from Aziotta").

The locations where such inscriptions were found are the area of Mağazadamlari of today's Turkey, north of Ayazviran (Ayazören Köyü), northwest of Hamidiye (Hamidiye Köyü, Kula, Manisa), and at contemporary Gökçeören of Kula (ex Menye) 38°34′31″N 28°29′20″E. Its site is unlocated.
