= Katakekaumene =

Ancient district in Lydia

- Kula
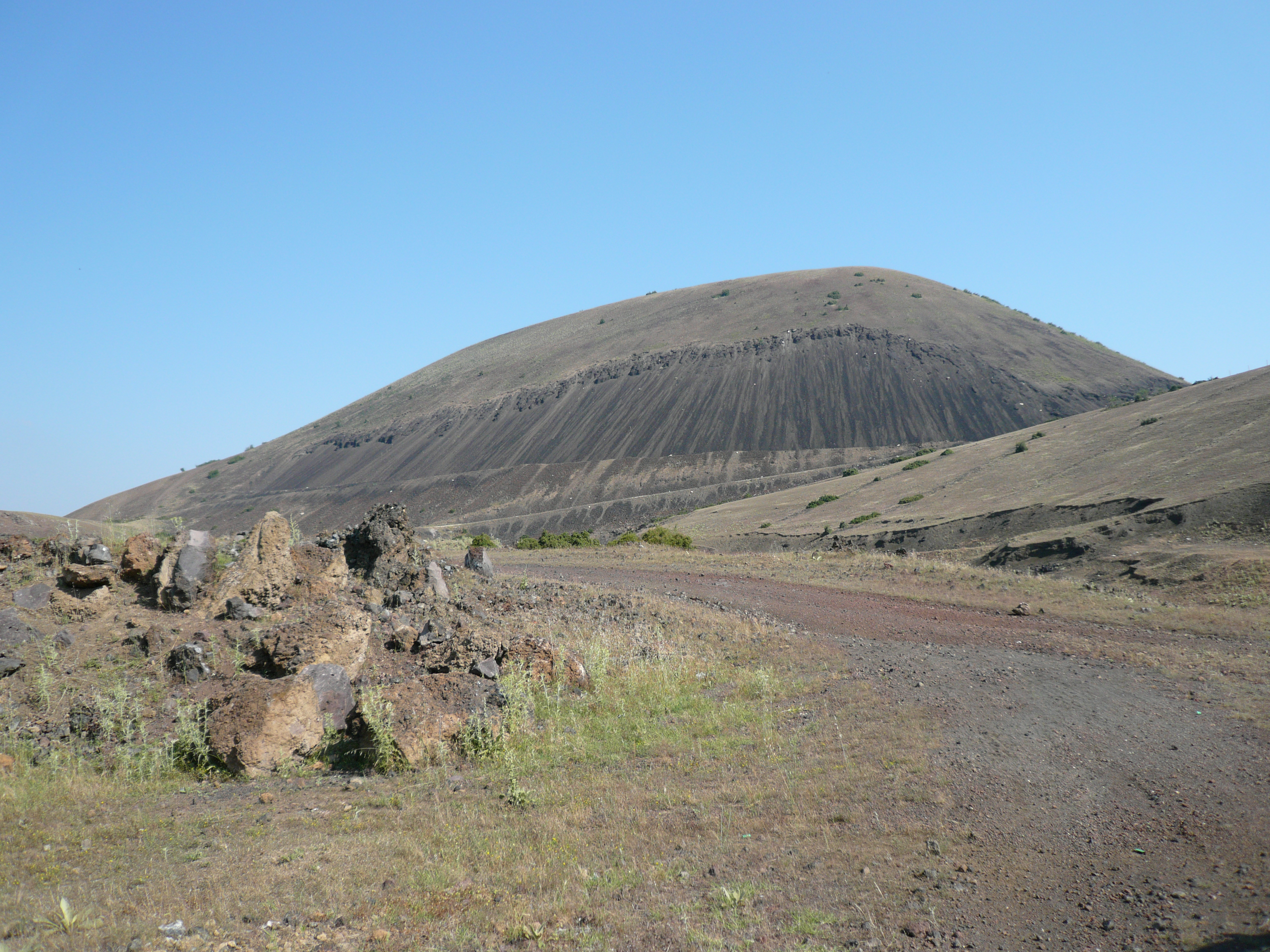
- Burnt lands of the Katakekaumene.

Highest point
- Elevation: 750 m (2,460 ft)
- Coordinates: 38°34′38″N 28°31′12″E

Geography
- Location within Turkey
- Location: Manisa Province, Turkey

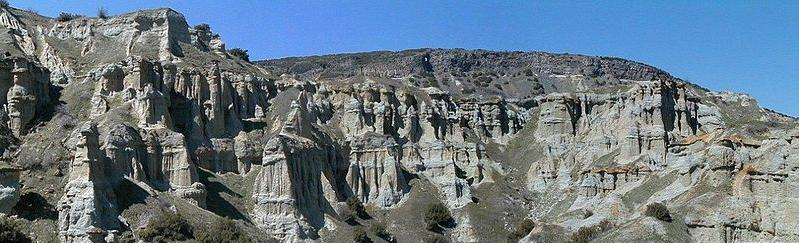
Kula Yanıkyöre rock formations

Katakekaumene or Catacecaumene (Greek: Κατακεκαυμένη) was a name for a district in Lydia (modern western Turkey), and a union of ten cities in the area, during the Hellenistic and Roman periods.

The name means "burnt land" or "burnt country", referring to the pitch-black color of the lava and the dormant volcanic belt of Kula, which was first described by Strabo. Strabo reported that a place named Katakekaumene was the site of the mythological battle between Zeus and the giant Typhon.

== Decapolis ==
Cities of the ancient decapolis included:

- Satala in Lydia
- Maionia in Lydia
- Tabala in Lydia
- Bagis
- Silandos
- Setae
- Daldis
- Philadelphia in Lydia
- Apollonos-Hieron
- Mesotimolos or Gordos
