= Kula, Manisa =

Kula
- District and municipality
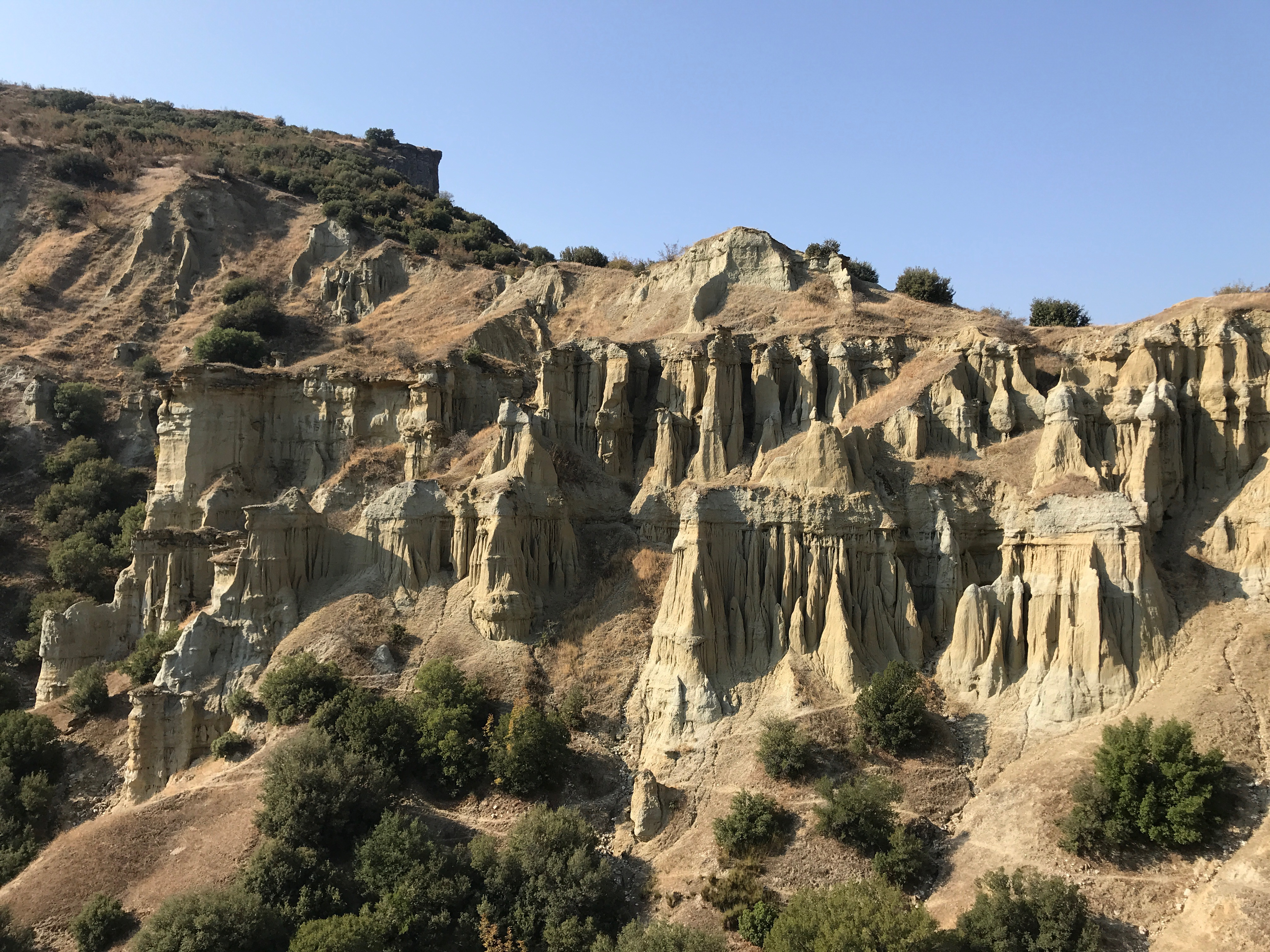
- Yanıkyöre rock formations near Kula

- Logo

- Map showing Kula District in Manisa Province

- Location within Turkey Location within Turkey Aegean
- Coordinates: 38°32′45″N 28°38′58″E
- Country: Turkey
- Province: Manisa

Government
  - Mayor: Hikmet Dönmez (CHP)
- Area: 981 km^{2} (379 sq mi)
- Elevation: 635 m (2,083 ft)
- Population (2025): 43.015
  - Density: 0.0438/km^{2} (0.114/sq mi)
- Time zone: UTC+3 (TRT)
- Postal code: 45170
- Area code: 0236
- Website: www.kula.bel.tr

Kula is a municipality and district of Manisa Province, Turkey. Its area is 981km^{2}, and its population is 43,227 (2022). The town lies at an elevation of 635 m (2,083 ft).

== History ==
Koula (Greek: Κοῦλα) begun as a settlement located on the site of the former Byzantine Opsikion Theme. In 1306, the city was captured by the Catalan Company under Roger de Flor. In 1384, the patriarchal possessions of the church at Koula were transported to the metropolitanate of Laodicea, while in 1394, the church was assumed by the metropolitanate of Philadelphia.

Suleiman, the ruler of Germiyan (r. 1361–87), relocated his capital from Kütahya to Kula after granting the Ottomans control of much of his realm, as part of the dowry payment for the marriage of his daughter Devletşah Hatun with the Ottoman prince and future sultan Bayezid I (r. 1389–1402).

From 1867 until 1922, Kula was part of the Aidin Vilayet of the Ottoman Empire. Until at least 1923, the town was inhabited by a mixed population of Christians and Muslims. The Christian population was composed of Turkified descendants of the original Greek inhabitants of the town, as well as by more recent immigrants from Samos and other Aegean islands.

== Composition ==
There are 60 neighbourhoods in Kula District:

- Ahmetli
- Akgün
- Aktaş
- Ayazören
- Ayvatlar
- Balıbey
- Başıbüyük
- Battalmustafa
- Bayramşah
- Bebekli
- Bey
- Börtlüce
- Camicedit
- Çarıkballı
- Çarıkmahmutlu
- Çiftçiibrahim
- Dereköy
- Dört Eylül
- Emre
- Encekler
- Erenbağı
- Eroğlu
- Esenyazı
- Evciler
- Gökçeören
- Gökdere
- Gölbaşı
- Güvercinlik
- Hacıtufan
- Hamidiye
- Hayalli
- İbrahimağa
- İncesu
- Kalınharman
- Karaoba
- Kavacık
- Kenger
- Kızılkaya
- Konurca
- Körez
- Narıncalıpıtrak
- Narıncalısüleyman
- Ortaköy
- Papuçlu
- Sandal
- Saraçlar
- Sarnıçköy
- Şehitlioğlu
- Şeremet
- Şeritli
- Şeyhli
- Seyitali
- Söğütdere
- Tatlıçeşme
- Topuzdamları
- Yağbastı
- Yeniköy
- Yeşilyayla
- Yurtbaşı
- Zaferiye

== Economy ==
As of 1920, Kula's main industry was carpet making.

== Yanıkyöre volcanic rock formations ==
The district is renowned for the cone-shaped volcanic rock formations, numbering at about eighty, in the nearby Yanıkyöre (literally the burnt land) area, also sometimes still referred to, including in Turkey, under the Greek name of Katakekaumene, which has the same meaning. Increasingly brought to the attention of a wider public in recent years as a natural curiosity, other recently coined terms to describe the area include "Cappadocia of the Aegean Region, Turkey" or even "Kuladocia".

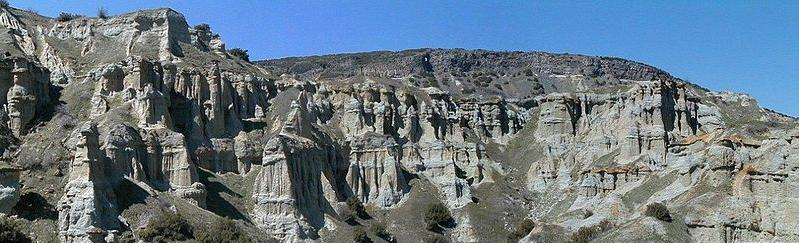
Panorama of Kula Yanıkyöre rock formations

Kula Volcanic Geopark was accepted and certificated by UNESCO on 6 September 2013 at 37th UNESCO general conference in Naples. So that Kula Volcanic Geopark joined UNESCO Global Geopark Network. Also this patent became the first geopark of Turkey, 58th geopark in Europe, and 96th geopark in the world.

== See also ==
- Kula volcano

== Bibliography ==
- Varlık, Mustafa Çetin (1974). Germiyan-oğulları tarihi (1300-1429) (in Turkish). Ankara: Atatürk University Press. OCLC 6807984.
