= Daldis =

Town situated on the borders of ancient Lydia and Phrygia

Coordinates: 38.6684°N 28.0752°E

Daldis (Ancient Greek: Δάλδις, ἡ Δάλδις), was a town on the borders of ancient Lydia and Phrygia, a former bishopric, and is now a Latin Catholic titular see. It also minted coins in antiquity with the legend Δαλδιανων. It also bore the name Flaviocaesaria or Phlabiokaisareia, which is not attested among ancient authors but is reconstructed from epigraphic and other evidence.

== History ==
The ancient city of Daldis was located near Nardi Kale in Asia Minor (modern Asian Turkey). It was in Lydia. Ramsay believed it was on the Meander River, near the towns of Apollonos-Hieron and Tripolis.

The mother of the ancient Greek philosopher and professional diviner Artemidorus was from Daldis.

The town minted its own coin with the epigraph Δαλδιανων.

It was important enough in the Roman province of Lydia to become a suffragan bishopric of the Metropolitan See of Sardes, but the city latter faded.

== Bishopric ==
The diocese was founded in early Roman times and sent delegates to many important councils. Bishops include:

- Paul, attendee at Council of Nicaea
- Theodore attendee at Third Council of Constantinople 680.
- John attended Second Council of Nicaea (787).
- Apiphanius attended the Photius Council (869–870)

The diocese was nominally restored in 1933 as a Latin Catholic titular bishopric. It is vacant, having had the following incumbents, both of the lowest (episcopal) rank:

- Titular Bishop Charles Weber (萬賓來), Divine Word Missionaries (S.V.D.) (1937.12.02 – 1946.04.11), Apostolic Vicar of the then Yizhoufu (December 2, 1937 – April 11, 1946), promoted suffragan Bishop of Yizhoufu (April 11, 1946 – August 7, 1970)
- Titular Bishop Henry Theophilus Klonowski (1947.05.10 – 1977.05.06), Auxiliary Bishop of Scranton (USA) (1947.05.10 – 1973.05.15)

== Gallery ==
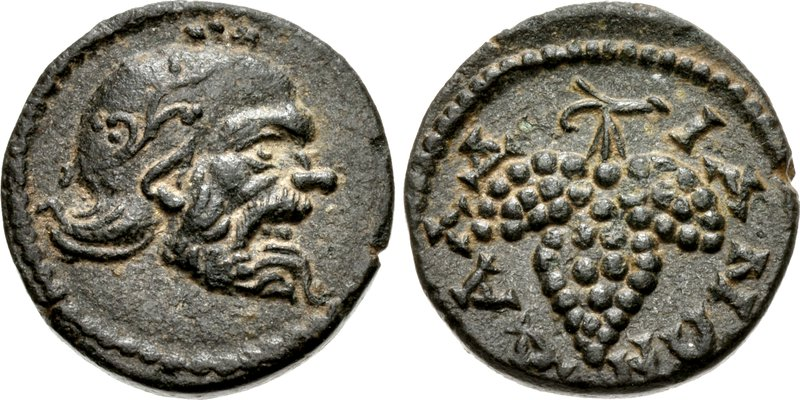
Coin of Daldis, legend ΔΑΛΔΙΑΝΩΝ, dated to 138-192

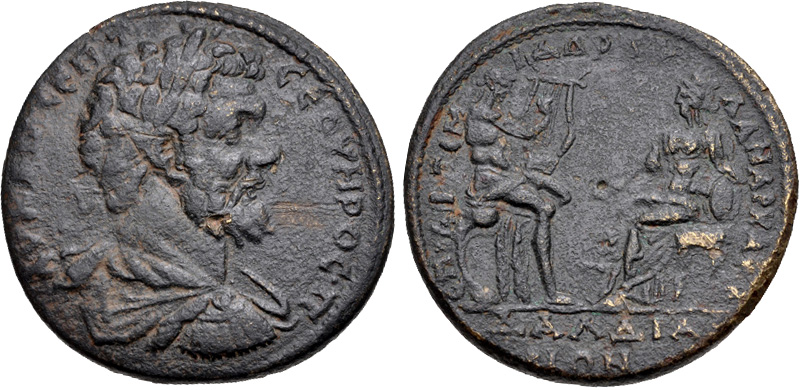
Coin of Daldis, legend ΔΑΛΔΙΑΝΩΝ, dated to 193-211

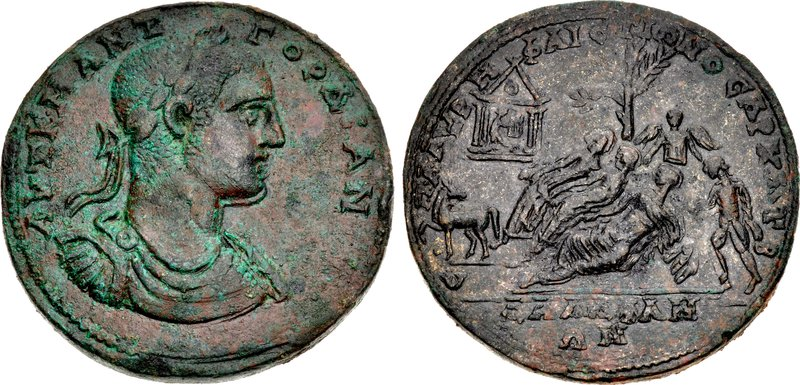
Medallion of Daldis, legend ΔΑΛΔΙΑΝΩΝ, dated to 238-244

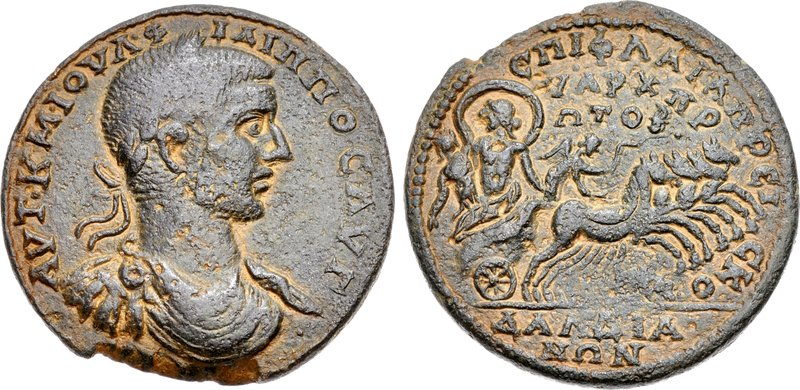
Coin of Daldis, legend ΔΑΛΔΙΑΝΩΝ, dated to 244-249

== See also ==
- Catholic Church in Turkey
