= Setae (Lydia) =

Ancient Lydian city in Anatolia

Coordinates: 38°46′46″N 28°37′53″E

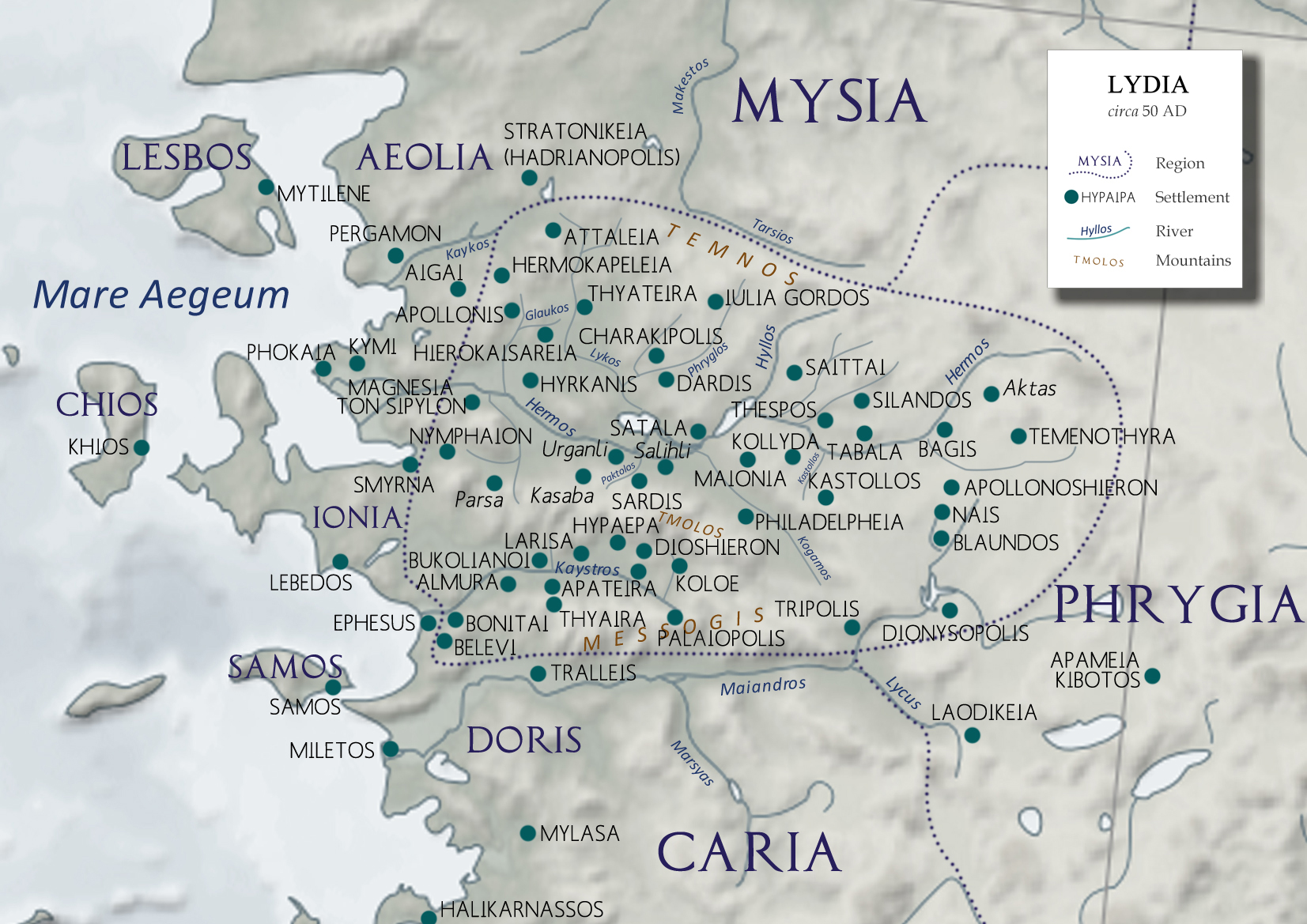
Setae/Saittai among the cities of Lydia (c. 50 AD)

Setae, Setai (Ancient Greek: Σέται), Settae, Settai (Σέτται), Saettae, Saittai, or Saittae (Σαίτται), was a town of ancient Lydia, located at Sidas Kaleh in Modern Turkey. The ruins of that town consist of a stadium, tombs, and ruins of several temples. The town is not mentioned by any of the earlier writers, but appears in Ptolemy and Hierocles.

== Location ==
The city was located between the upper reaches of the River Hermus and its tributary the Hyllus, and was part of the Katakekaumene.

Its site is located at Sidas Kale, near İcikler in Asiatic Turkey.

== History ==
The city struck coins and was visited by the Emperor Hadrian.

The Apollo Aksyros Temple is located in the ancient city. In one of the steles of the temple, there is an inscription which reads "Melita and Makedon stole Eia’s fishnet and other belongings. Therefore, they were punished by God. Their parents consulted Apollon Aksyros for their sake and made a vow...".

== Bishopric ==
Setae was also the seat of a Byzantine Bishopric. Bishop Limenius signed the Chalcedon Creed while Bishop Amachius spoke at the Council of Chalcedon. Limenius signed the documents at the Council of Ephesus. Although it is an Islamic area now, under the name Saittae, it remains a titular see of the Roman Catholic Church.
