= Kula (volcano) =

Volcanic field in Turkey

- Katakekaumene
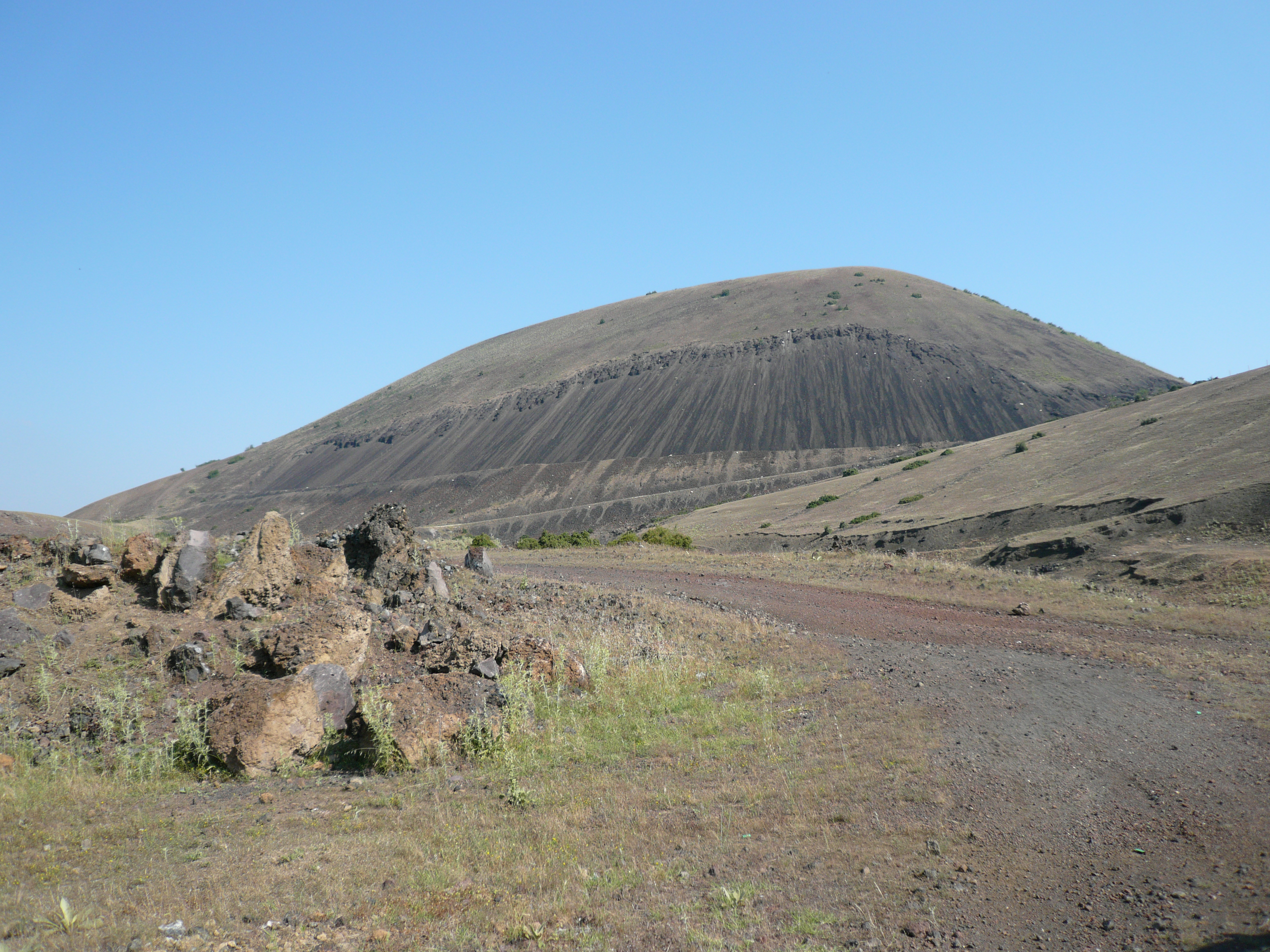
- The scoria cone at the Kula Volcano

Highest point
- Elevation: 750 m (2,460 ft)
- Coordinates: 38°34′38″N 28°31′12″E

Geography
- Location within Turkey
- Location: Manisa Province, Turkey

Geology
- Mountain type: Volcanic field / Cinder cones
- Last eruption: Unknown

Kula is a volcanic field located in western Turkey. Kula field consists of a broad area of cinder cones and maars. It is the westernmost volcano of Turkey. The volcanic character of the area was recognized in antiquity, when it was named Katakekaumene (the burned lands) from the appearance of the environment, which was mostly suited for viticulture. Volcanism began in the Miocene and over three stages continued in the Holocene. It is associated with the presence of two neighboring active graben structures. Footprints of prehistoric humans have been found in the area. The area is a geopark recognized by UNESCO given the universal and scientific value.

== Geography ==
The volcanic field is located in Kula, Manisa Province. It is 65 km west of Uşak and 130 km east of İzmir. It is located on the northern side of the Gediz Graben, while the Bozdağ mountain range is on the southern side.

The current cones are mostly of small size and one of them has its internal structure exposed. Total volume of the volcanic field extrusion is about 2,3 km^{3} and the lavas are rich in xenoliths. The lava field is formed of basaltic lavas and tephra that were originated from 80 cinder cones.

== Geology ==
The Anatolian Plate is a minor tectonic plate moving towards the west. The east of the Anatolian Plate is being compressed by the northward motion of Arabian Plate forming a mountainous area. Aside from the mountainous eastern provinces, the plate is characteristically a plateau about 1 km above sea level. The plateau moves west away from the mountain belts along two strike-slip faults; the North Anatolian Fault and the East Anatolian Fault. Towards the west of the plate movement changes from westward to south-westward, generating north–south extensions which increases towards the west and the Aegean Sea, itself formed of stretched continental crust. Extension in Central Turkey has generated broad basins such as the Lake Tuz depression while in Western Turkey larger amounts of extension are accommodated on east–west normal faults which define grabens separated by mountain ranges. The town of Kula is situated upon the edge of one of these grabens, the Gediz Graben, and is about halfway between Uşak, where the plateau ends, and İzmir on the Aegean coast. The oldest remaining volcanic rocks of Kula are about 2 Ma old and observations indicate that most of the basalts extruded since this time have been preserved.

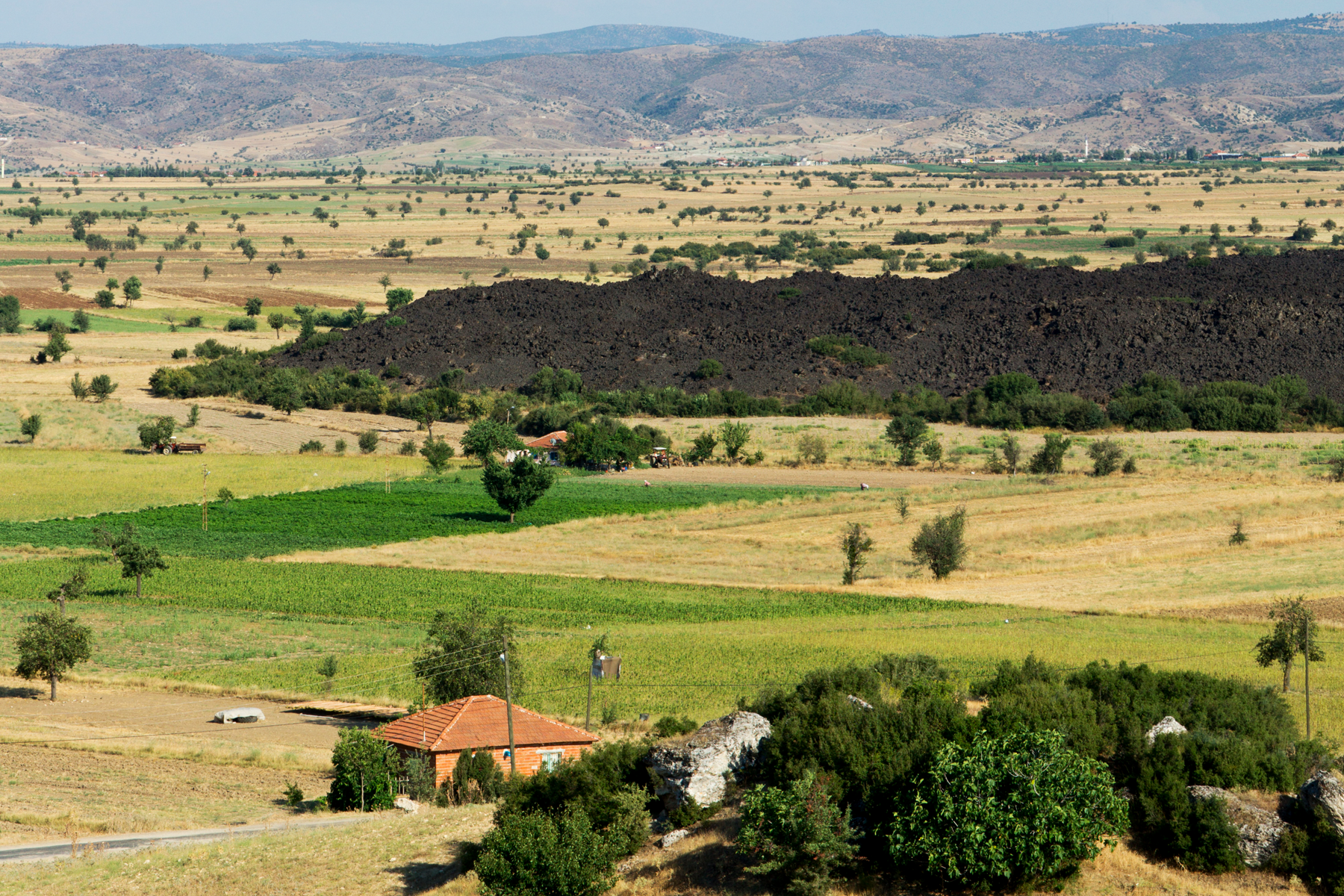
Lava flows sourced from the scoria cones nearby

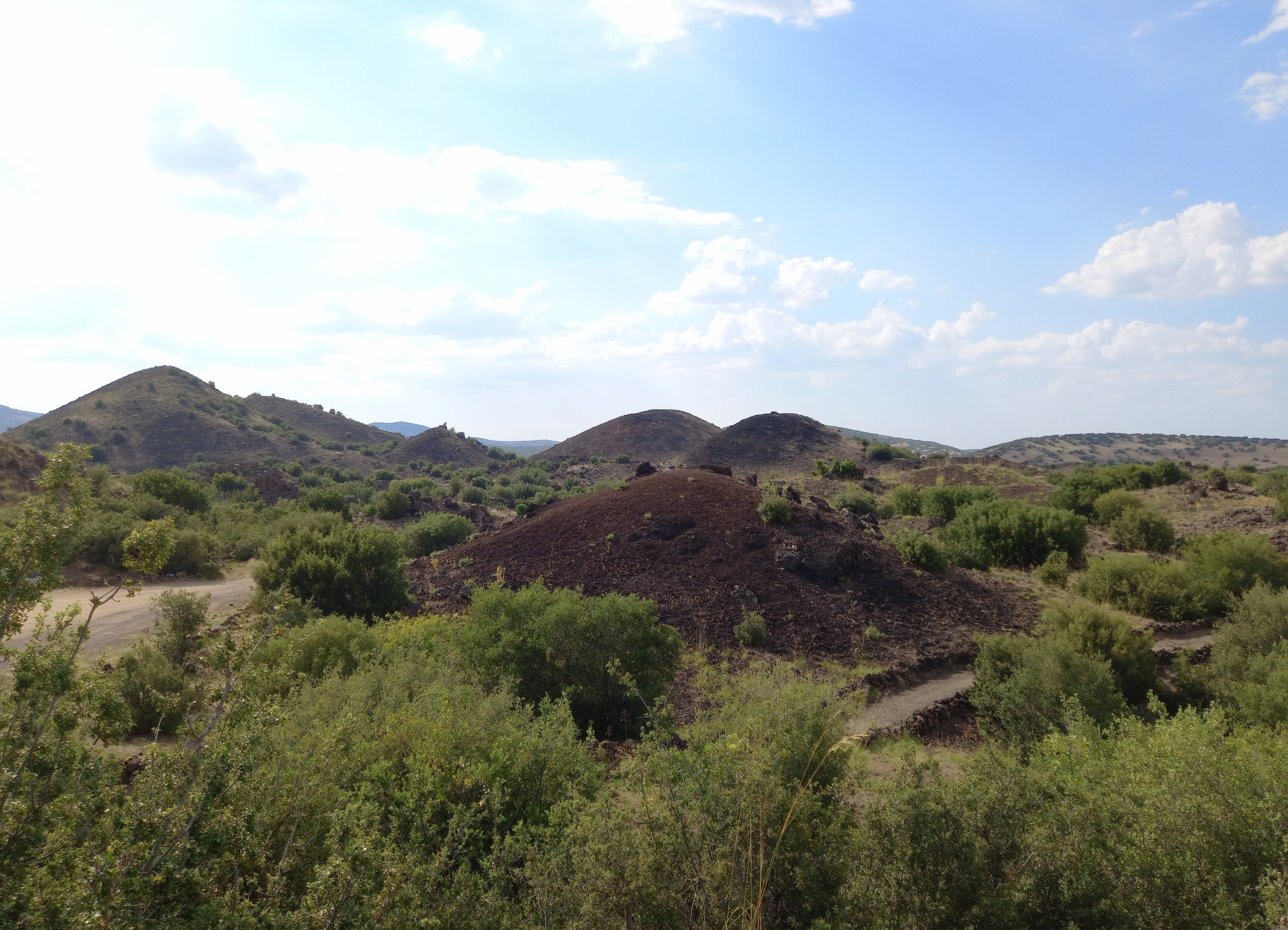
Mounds within the volcanic field

=== Geologic formations ===
Within the Kula Volcanic Geopark and near the volcanic field, there are several other geologic wonders caused by this volcanic system which include hoodoos, basalt columns and hot springs.

== Ecology ==
The plant succession on the lava fields and cones was subject of a study in 1974, which found that the vegetation is influenced both by climate factors such as temperature and precipitation and the orientation of the sides of the volcanoes in question.

== Climate ==
The Mediterranean climate is dominant in the Aegean area, which the volcano can be found in. The usual characteristics of the Mediterranean climate are warm and arid summers with rather mild, rainy winters. However, due to the topography of the region, other specific climates can occur at certain places. Further, there are climatic differences between the east of the region and the coastline because of increasing altitude heading to the east. Therefore, the average yearly temperature is 12.2 °C and average yearly precipitation is 540.8 mm in Uşak, a city in the vicinity of the volcano, whereas these values are 17.5 °C and 693.2 mm respectively in İzmir. On the other hand, the lowest temperature recorded in January was -20 °C in Uşak and -8.2 °C in İzmir.

== See also ==
- List of volcanoes in Turkey
