= Apollonos Hieron =

Ancient city in Lydia, Asia Minor

- Location within Turkey Location within West and Central Asia
- 38°2′42″N 28°49′50″E
- Type: City
- Location: Turkey

Apollonos Hieron (Greek: Ἀπόλλωνος ἱερόν, "Temple of Apollo") was an ancient city of Lydia.

== Location ==
It was located about 300 stadia from Pergamon on a hill, but its exact location is unknown.

The inhabitants of the village of Buldan hold that their town is the location of Apollonos Hieron. However, Buldan is known to be the site of Tripolis, and both cities sent separate delegates to the Council of Chalcedon. Ramsay believed that both cities were adjacent to each other and this may explain why Pliny thought the name of Tripolis had previously been Apollonos. He more generally puts it in the Plain of Philadelphia, in the Lykos River Valley.

Apollonos Hieron was known for its temple, and is mentioned by Pliny, who describes it as small. It is possibly mentioned by Aristides and Strabo. Apollonos Hieron minted its own coins, of which there are today many examples.

== Bishopric ==
Apollonos Hieron was also the seat of a bishopric and remains a titular see in the Roman Catholic Church. Bishop Leucius of Apollonos Hieron signed at the Council of Chalcedon.
