= Gökçeören, Kula =

Gökçeören
- Neighbourhood
- Location in Turkey Gökçeören (Turkey Aegean)
- Coordinates: 38°34′31″N 28°29′20″E
- Country: Turkey
- Province: Manisa
- District: Kula
- Population (2022): 1,945
- Time zone: UTC+3 (TRT)

Gökçeören, formerly Menye, is a neighbourhood of the municipality and district of Kula, Manisa Province, Turkey. Its population is 1,945 (2022). Before the 2013 reorganisation, it was a town (belde).
