= Dorylaeus =

Dorylaeus (Greek: Δορύλαιος; early 1st century BC), was a commander in the Kingdom of Pontus who served under Mithridates the Great. Dorylaeus was also a close friend and second in command of Mithridates. He reinforced Archelaus with eighty thousand fresh troops after the latter's loss at Battle of Chaeronea. Dorylaeus wanted to bring about a battle with Sulla right away, but changed his mind after a skirmish with Roman troops.

== Bibliography ==
- Plutarch: Sulla, 20
- Strabo: Geography, 10.4.10
- Inscription: OGIS 372
