= Pagoda =

Usually religious tower in Asian countries

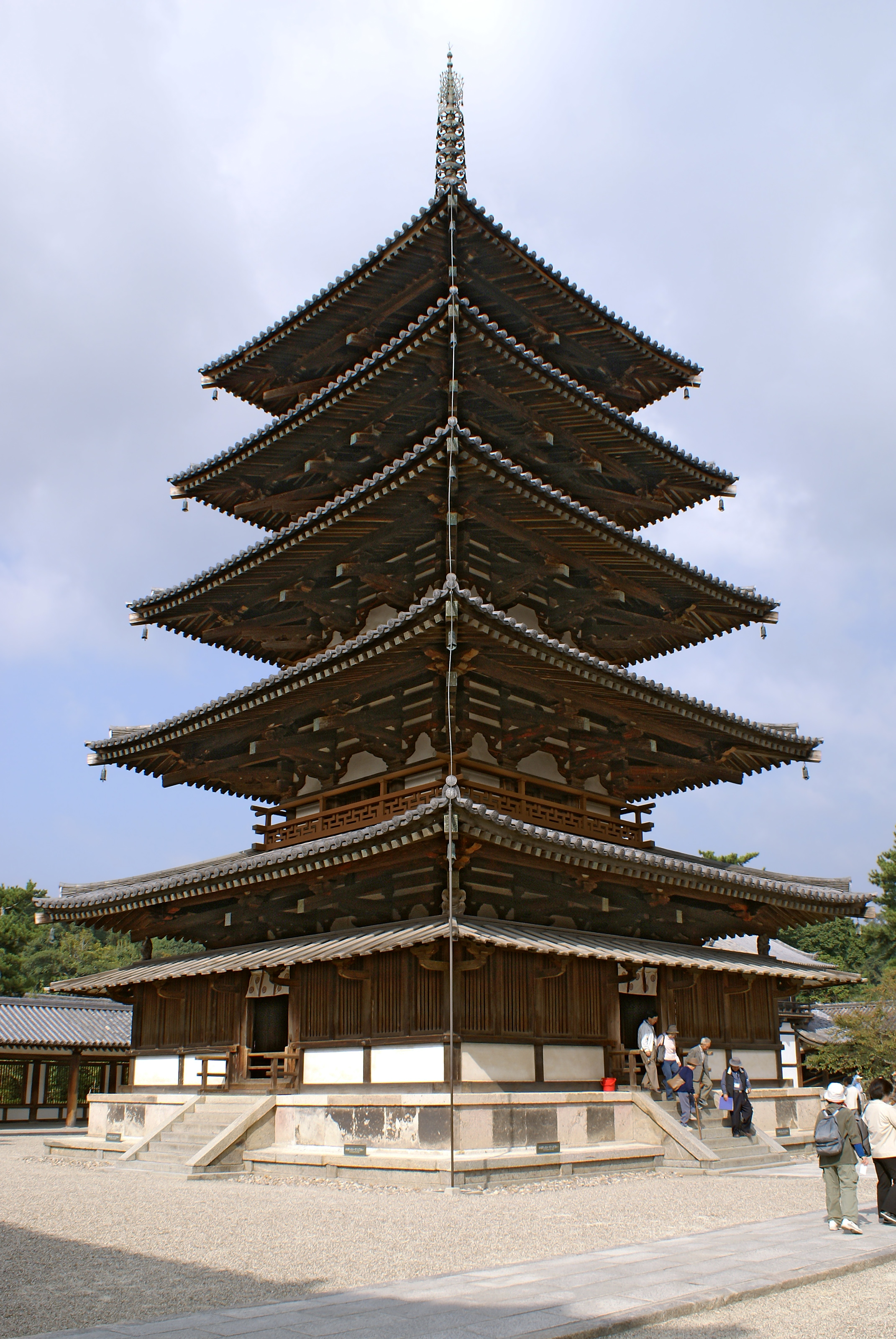
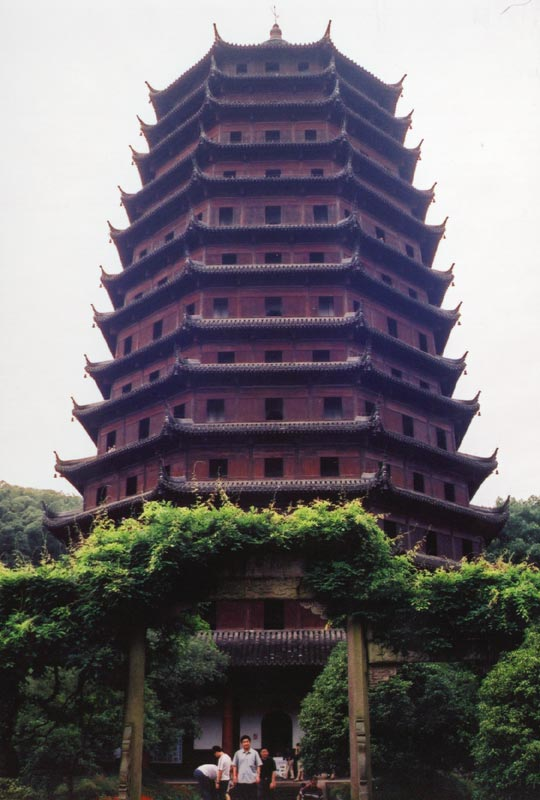
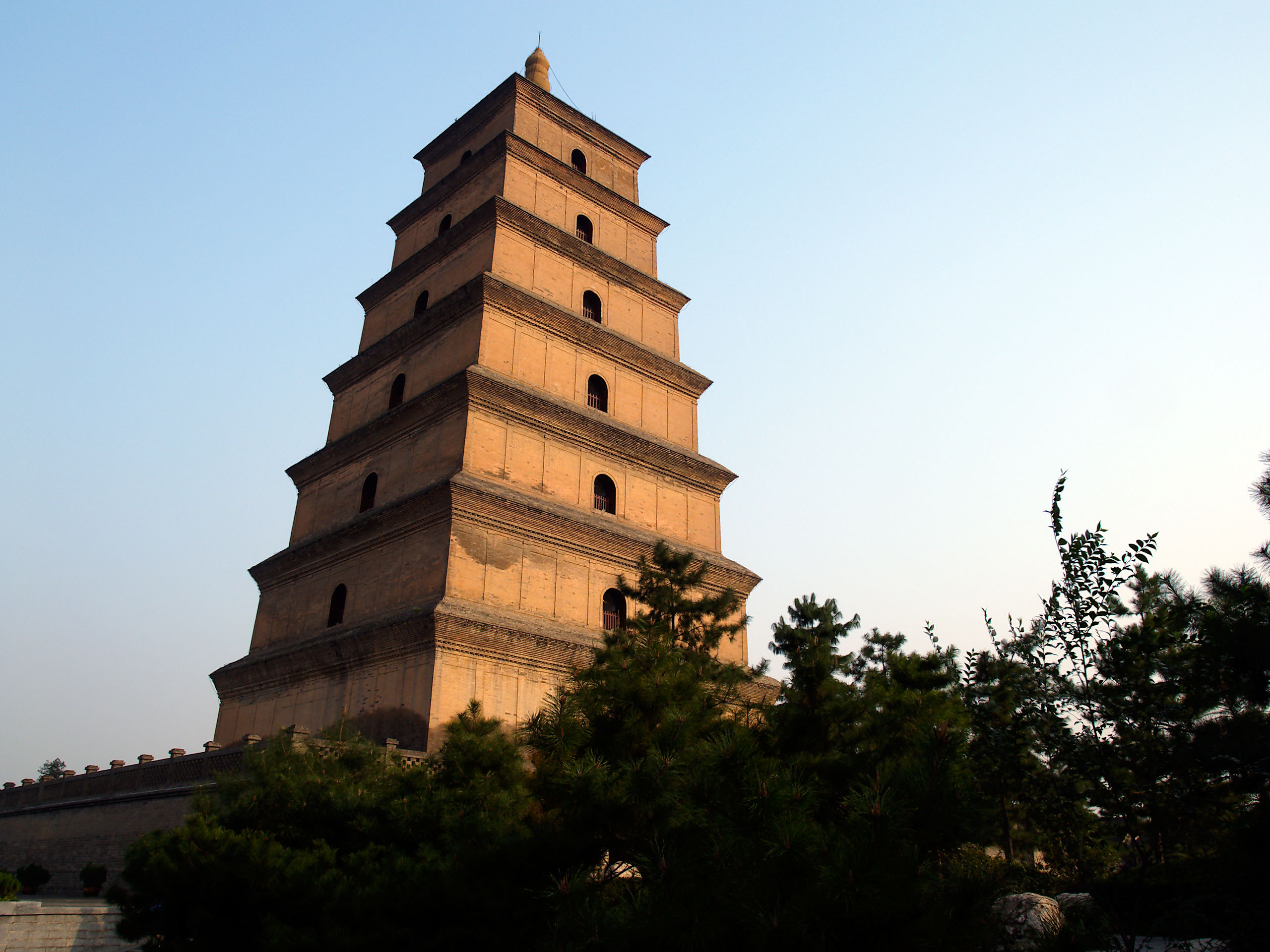
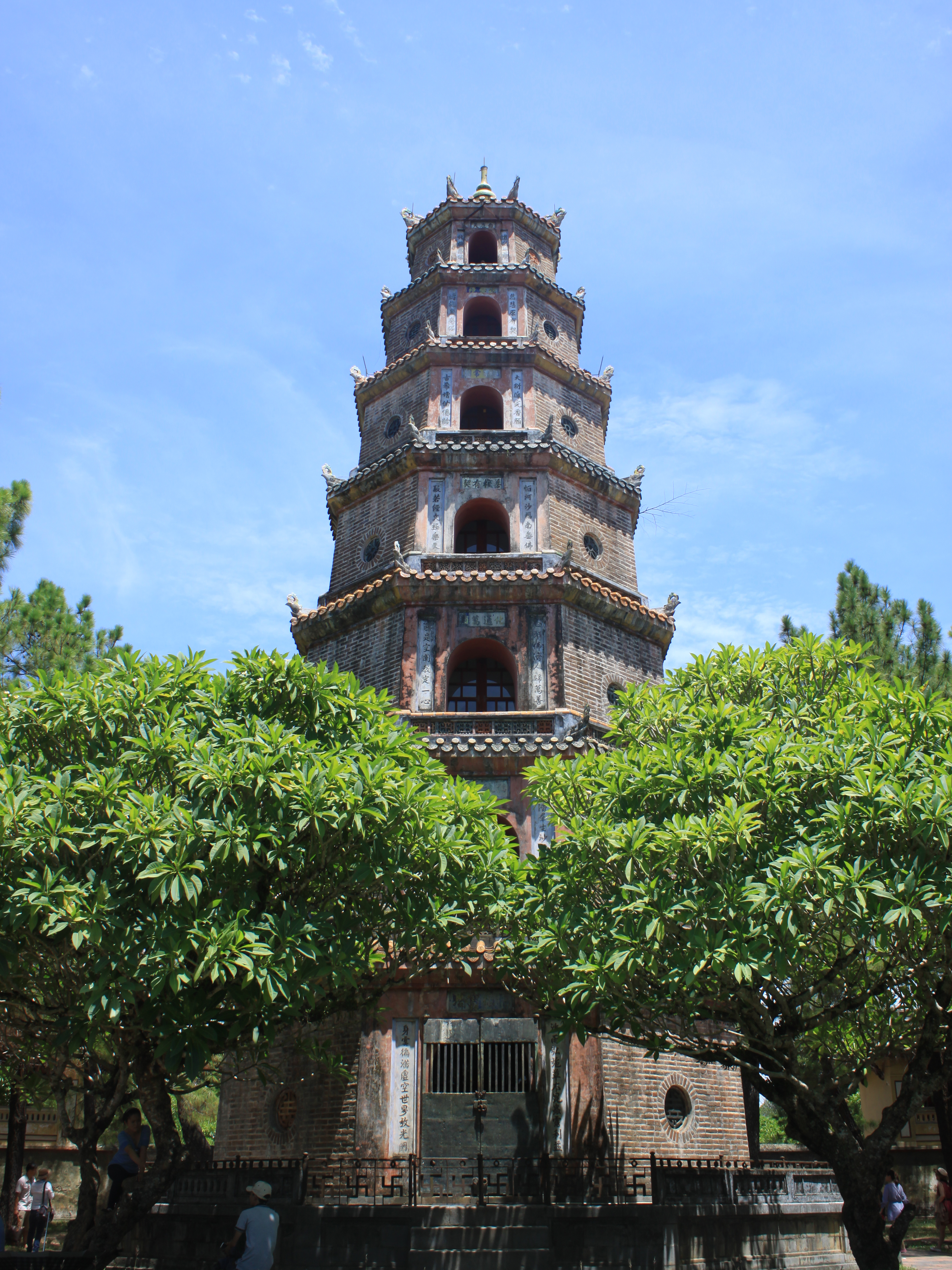
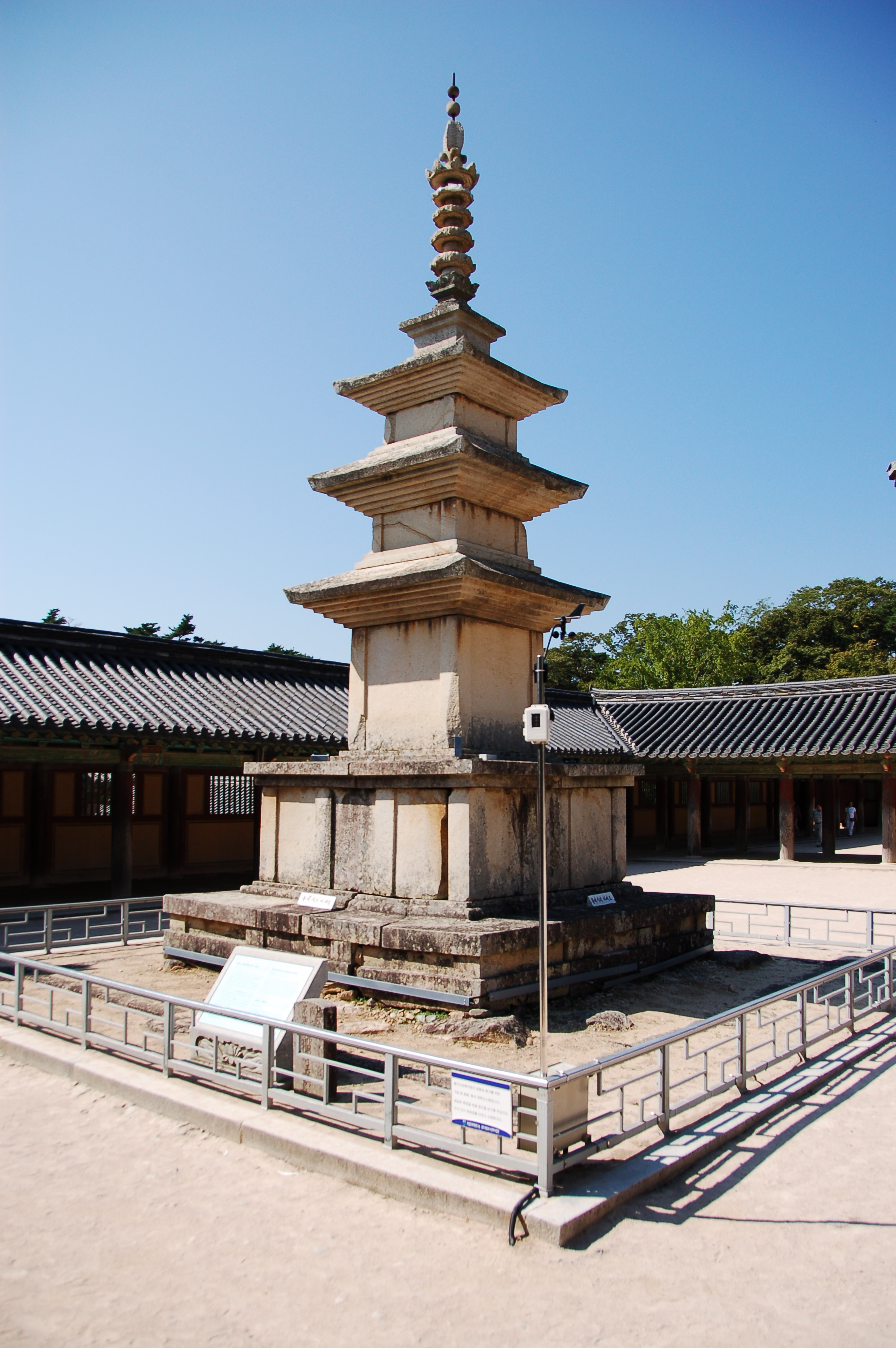
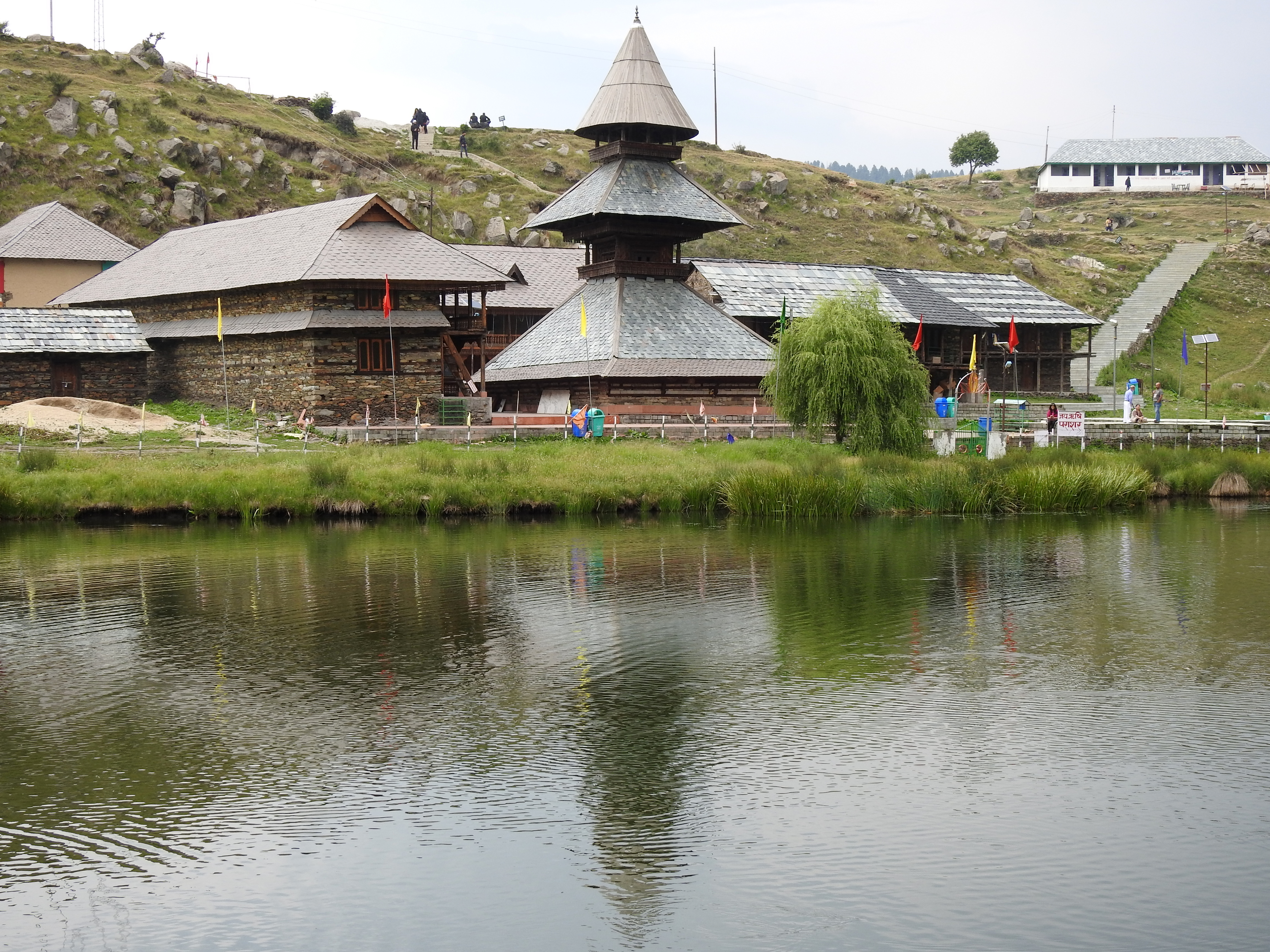
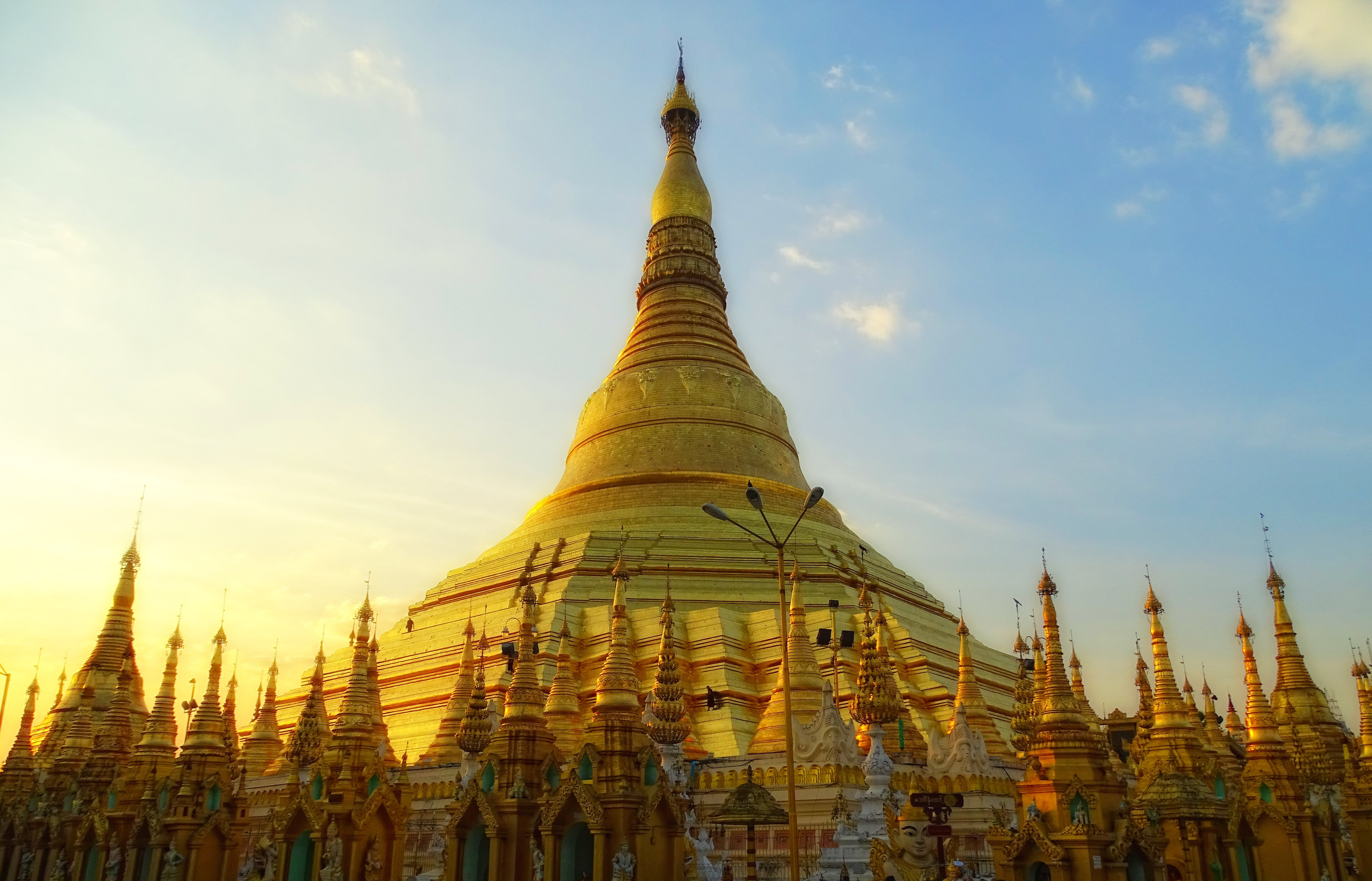
Top to bottom, from left to right: Pagoda of Hōryū-ji, Japan; Liuhe Pagoda, Hangzhou, China; Giant Wild Goose Pagoda of Xi'an, China; Phước Duyên Tower, Thiên Mụ Temple, Vietnam; Seokgatap of Bulguksa, South Korea; Prashar Lake temple, Himachal Pradesh, India; Shwedagon Pagoda of Yangon, Myanmar

A pagoda is a tiered tower with multiple eaves, common across Asia. Most pagodas were built to have a religious function, most often Buddhist, but sometimes Taoist or Hindu, and were often in or near viharas. The pagoda traces its origins to the stupa, while its design was developed in ancient India. Chinese pagodas (Chinese: 塔; pinyin: Tǎ) are a traditional part of Chinese architecture. In addition to religious use, since ancient times Chinese style pagodas have been valued for the spectacular views they offer, and many classical poems attest to the joy of scaling pagodas.

The oldest and tallest pagodas were made of wood, but most that survived were made of brick or stone. Some are solid with no interior. Hollow pagodas have no interior floors or rooms, but the interior often contains an altar or a smaller pagoda, as well as a series of staircases for visitors to climb to see the view from an opening on one side of each tier. Most have between three and 13 tiers (almost always an odd number) and the classic gradual tiered eaves.

In some countries, the term may refer to other religious structures. In Vietnam and Cambodia, due to French translation, the English term pagoda more generically refers to a place of worship, although pagoda is not an accurate word for a Buddhist vihāra. The architectural structure of the stupa has spread across Asia, taking on diverse forms specific to each region. Many Philippine bell towers are highly influenced by pagodas through Chinese workers hired by the Spaniards.

== Etymology ==
Variants of the term pagoda across all European languages derive directly or indirectly from 16th-century Portuguese pagode, originally in specific reference to Hindu temples of southwestern India along the Malabar Coast and their main idols. Despite abundant discussion of possible origins in languages ranging from Persian to Nanjingese, it is clear from the extensive research of Dalgado and others that early Portuguese use pointed directly to borrowing from the local Dravidian languages, using one or more of the cognates in Malayalam, Kannada, and Tamil of such terms as പകോതി (Pakōti, "temple of Durga") and பகவதி (Pakavati, "Goddess", used for Durga, Parvati, and their idols), with possible intentional corruption due to the influence of Portuguese pagão ("pagan") and the early writers' own strong Catholicism. The Dravidian terms all ultimately derive from Sanskrit भगवती (Bhagavatī), a feminine form of "the Holy One" cognate with the title of the Bhagavad Gita and used for various Hindu goddesses and aspects of the divine.

== History ==
Kek Lok Si pagoda tiers labelled with their architectural styles

The origin of the pagoda can be traced to the stupa (3rd century BCE). The stupa, a dome shaped monument, was used as a commemorative monument to house sacred relics and writings. In East Asia, the architecture of Chinese towers and Chinese pavilions blended into pagoda architecture, eventually also spreading to Southeast Asia. Their construction was popularized by the efforts of Buddhist missionaries, pilgrims, rulers, and ordinary devotees to honor Buddhist relics.

Japan has a total of 22 five-storied timber pagodas constructed before 1850.

=== China ===
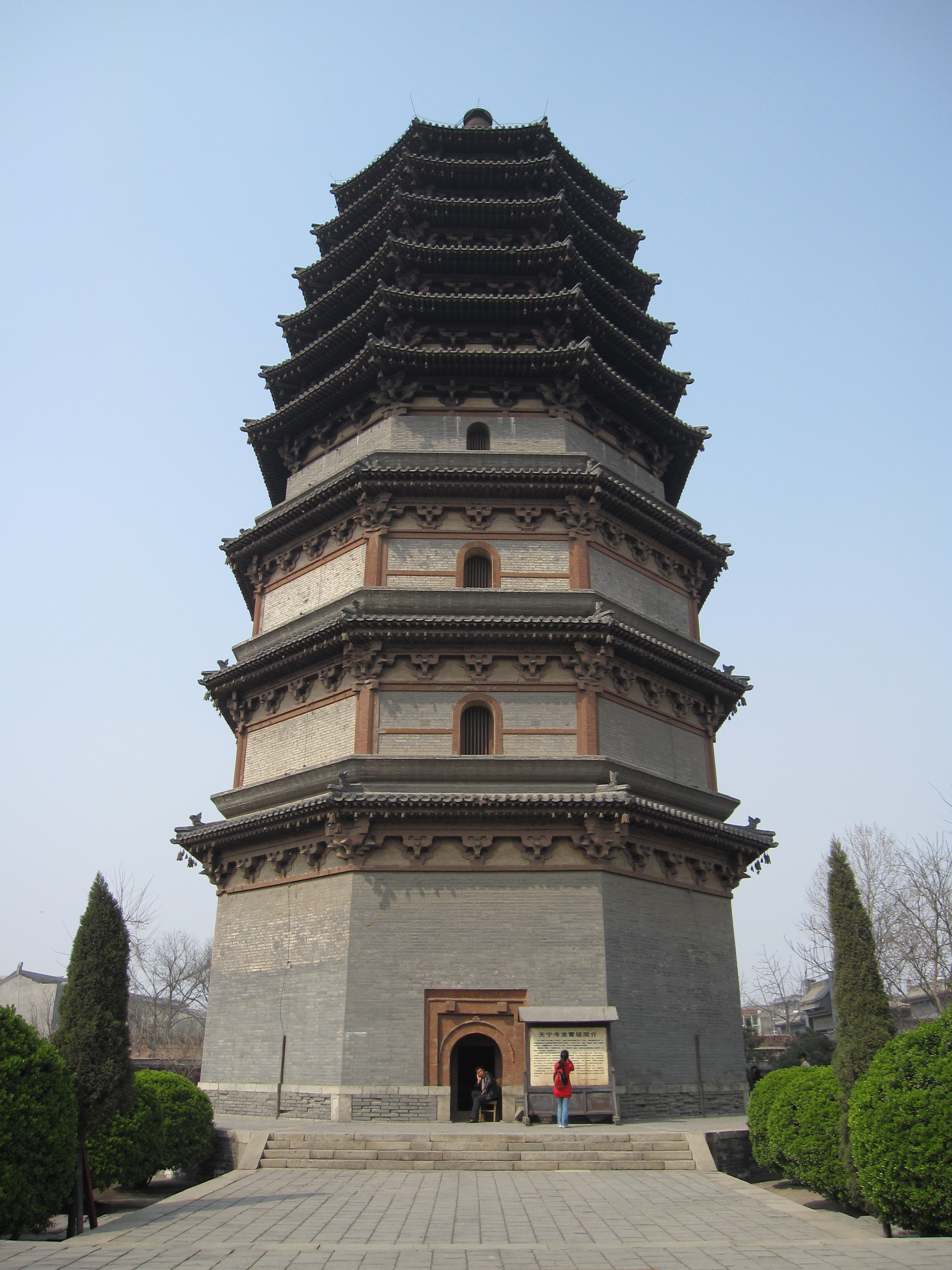
The Lingxiao Pagoda of Zhengding, Hebei, built in 1045 AD during the Song dynasty, with little change in later renovations

The earliest styles of Chinese pagodas were square-base and circular-base, with octagonal-base towers emerging in the 5th–10th centuries. The highest Chinese pagoda from the pre-modern age is the Liaodi Pagoda of Kaiyuan Monastery, Dingxian, Hebei, completed in the year 1055 AD under Emperor Renzong of Song and standing at a total height of 84 m (275 ft). Although it no longer stands, the tallest pre-modern pagoda in Chinese history was the 100-metre-tall wooden pagoda (330 ft) of Chang'an, built by Emperor Yang of Sui, and possibly the short-lived 6th century Yongning Pagoda (永宁宝塔) of Luoyang at roughly 137 metres. The tallest pre-modern pagoda still standing is the Liaodi Pagoda. In April 2007 a new wooden pagoda Tianning Temple of Changzhou was opened to the public, the tallest in China, standing 154 m (505 ft).

== Symbolism and geomancy ==
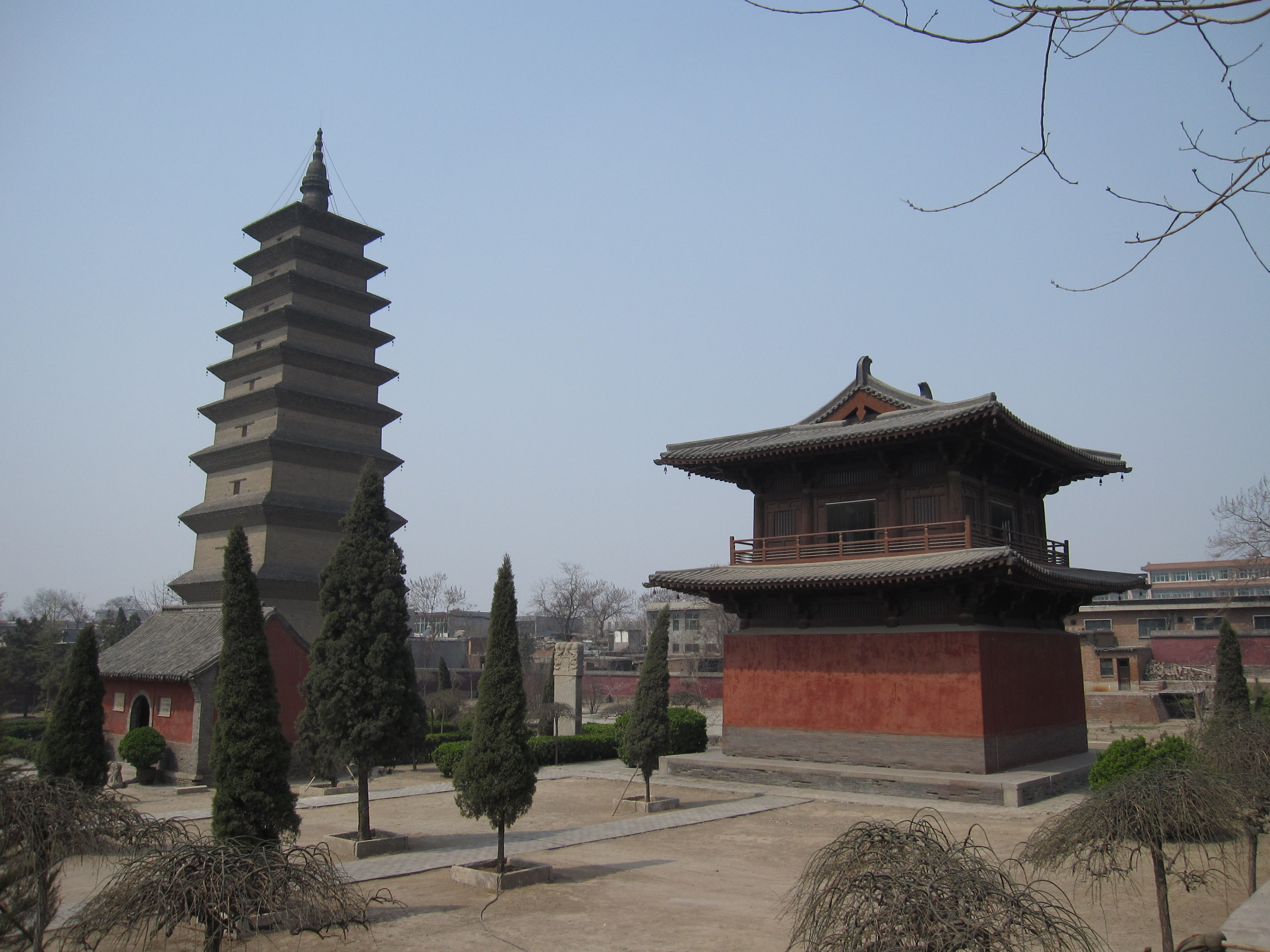
The Xumi Pagoda, built in 636 AD during the Tang dynasty.

Chinese iconography is noticeable in Chinese and other East Asian pagoda architectures. Also prominent is Buddhist iconography such as the image of the Shakyamuni and Gautama Buddha in the abhaya mudra. In an article on Buddhist elements in Han dynasty art, Wu Hung suggests that in these temples, Buddhist symbolism was fused with native Chinese traditions into a unique system of symbolism.

Some believed reverence at pagodas could bring luck to students taking the Chinese civil service examinations. When a pagoda of Yihuang County in Fuzhou collapsed in 1210, local inhabitants believed the disaster correlated with the recent failure of many exam candidates in the prefectural examinations The pagoda was rebuilt in 1223 and had a list inscribed on it of the recently successful examination candidates, in hopes that it would reverse the trend and win the county supernatural favor.

== Architecture ==
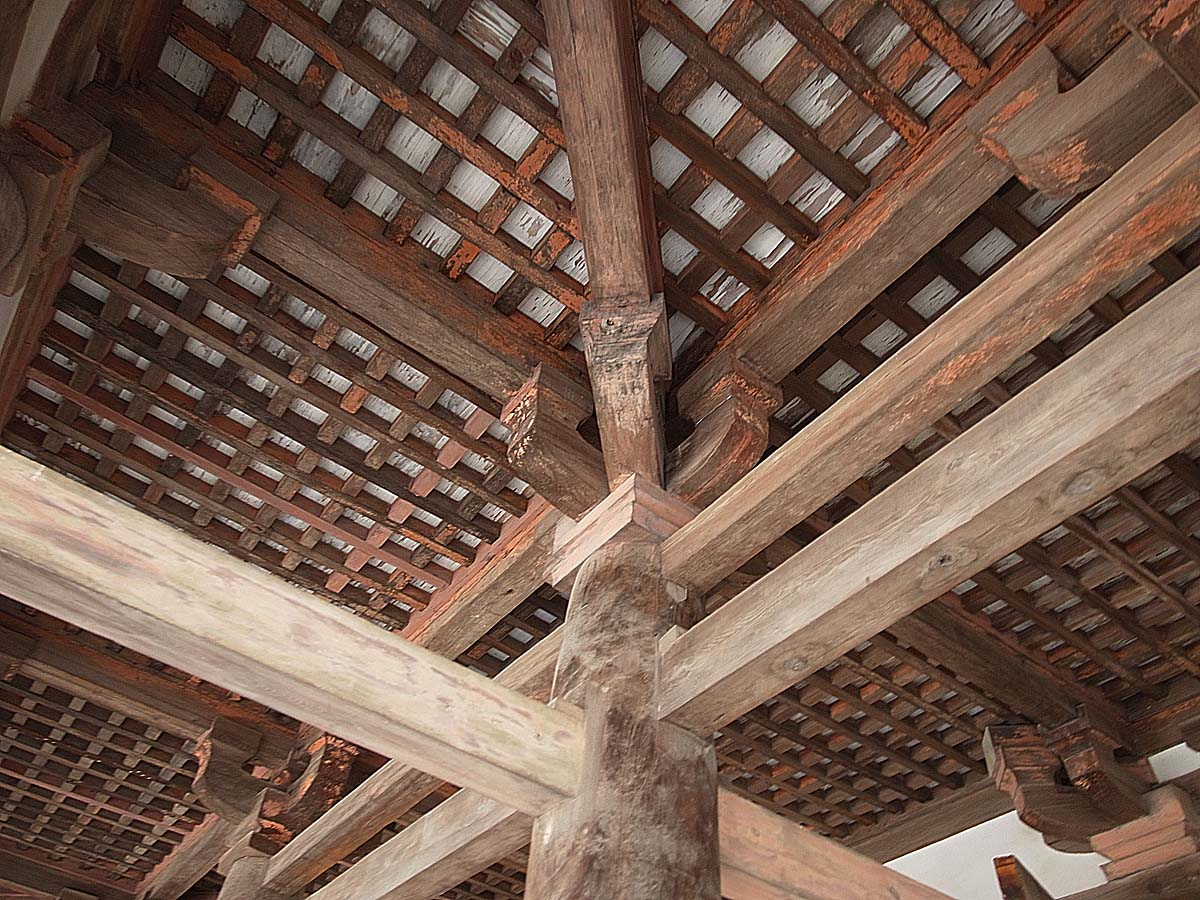
Floor-support structure in a corner of the Horyuji temple.

Pagodas come in many different sizes, with taller ones often attracting lightning strikes, inspiring a tradition that the finial decoration of the top of the structure can seize demons. Today many pagodas have been fitted with wires making the finial into a lightning rod.

Wooden pagodas possess certain characteristics thought to resist earthquake damage. These include the friction damping and sliding effect of the complex wooden dougong joints, the structural isolation of floors, the effects of wide eaves analogous to a balancing toy, and the Shinbashira phenomenon that the center column is bolted to the rest of the superstructure.

Pagodas traditionally have an odd number of levels, a notable exception being the eighteenth-century orientalist pagoda designed by Sir William Chambers at Kew Gardens in London.

The pagodas in Himalayas are derived from Newari architecture, very different from Chinese and Japanese styles.

== Construction materials ==
=== Wood ===
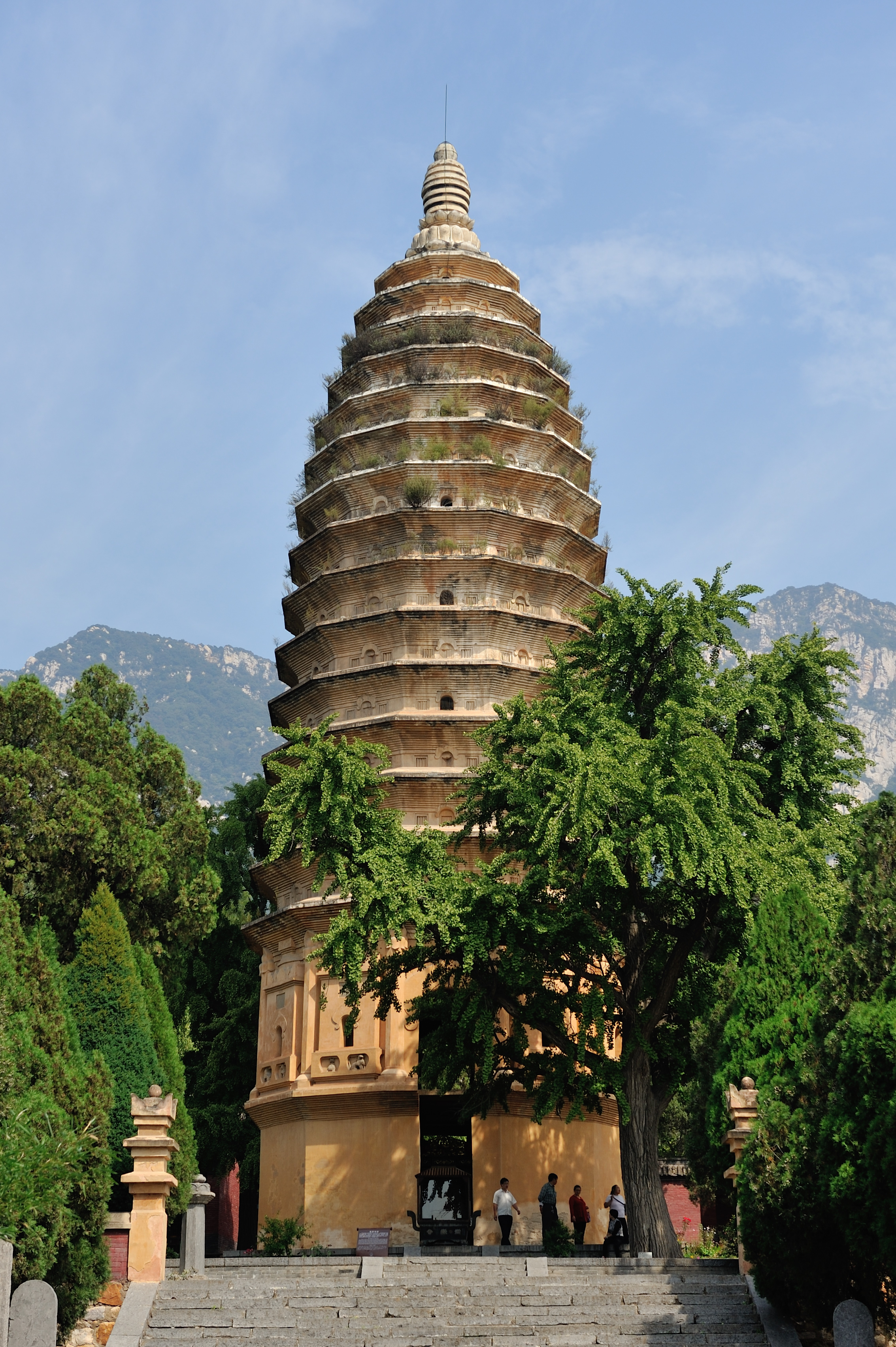
The 40-metre-tall (130 ft) Songyue Pagoda of 523 AD, the oldest extant stone pagoda in China

During the Southern and Northern dynasties, pagodas were mostly built of wood, as were other ancient Chinese structures. Wooden pagodas are resistant to earthquakes, and no Japanese pagoda has been destroyed by an earthquake, but they are prone to fire, natural rot, and insect infestation.

Examples of wooden pagodas:

- White Horse Pagoda at White Horse Temple, Luoyang
- Futuci Pagoda in Xuzhou, built in the Three Kingdoms period (c. 220–265)
- Many of the pagodas in Stories About Buddhist Temples in Luoyang, a Northern Wei text

The literature of subsequent eras also provides evidence of the domination of wooden pagoda construction. The famous Tang dynasty poet, Du Mu, once wrote:

480 Buddhist temples of the Southern Dynasties,
uncountable towers and pagodas stand in the misty rain.

The oldest standing fully wooden pagoda in China today is the Pagoda of Fogong Temple in Ying County, Shanxi, built in the 11th century during the Song/Liao dynasty (see Song architecture).

=== Transition to brick and stone ===
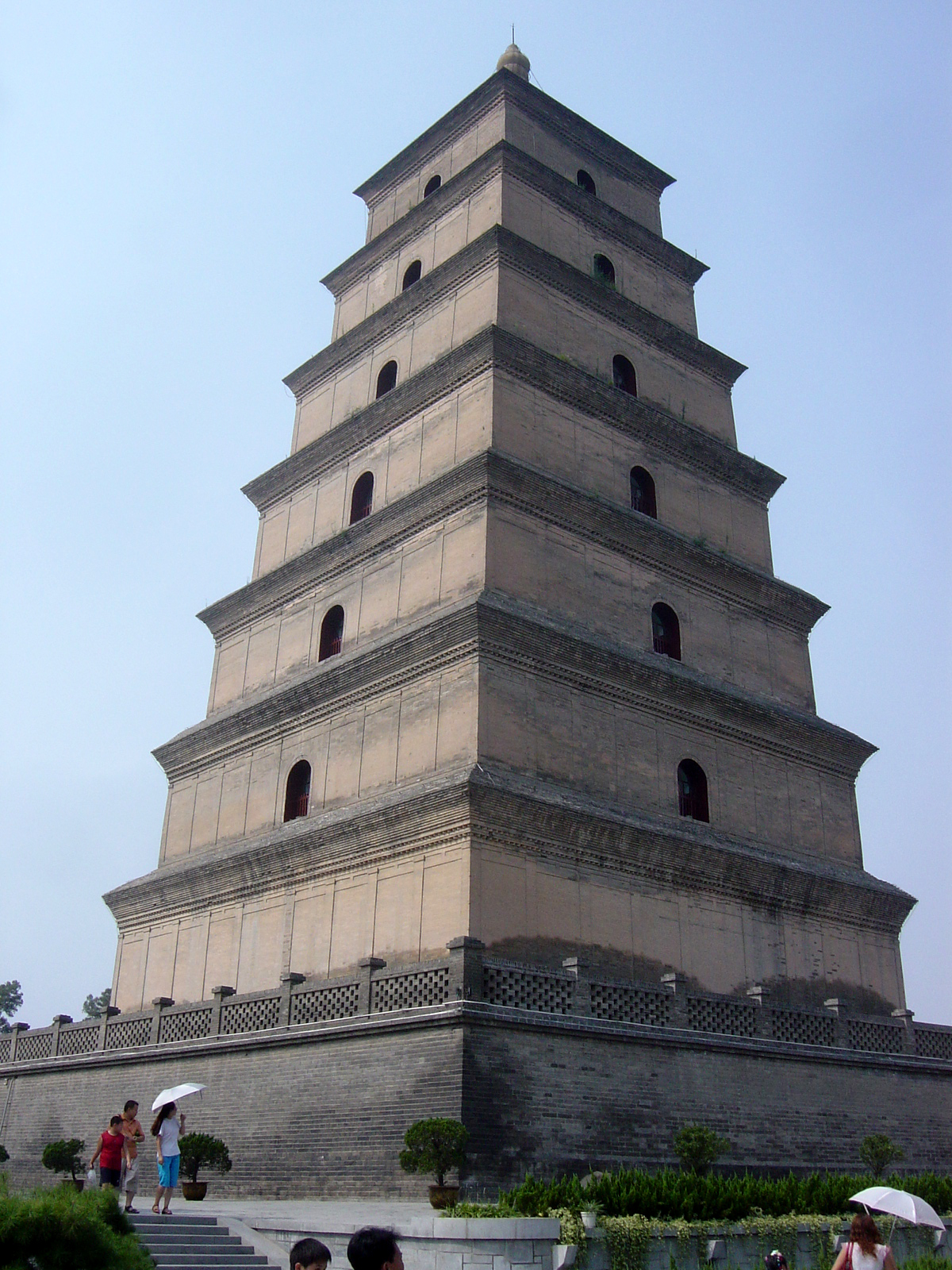
The brick-constructed Giant Wild Goose Pagoda, built by 652 and rebuilt in 704, during the Tang dynasty.

During the Northern Wei and Sui dynasties (386–618) experiments began with the construction of brick and stone pagodas. Even at the end of the Sui, however, wood was still the most common material. For example, Emperor Wen of the Sui dynasty (reigned 581–604) once issued a decree for all counties and prefectures to build pagodas to a set of standard designs, however since they were all built of wood none have survived. Only the Songyue Pagoda has survived, a circular-based pagoda built out of brick in 523 AD.

==== Brick ====
The earliest extant brick pagoda is the 40-metre (130 ft) tall Songyue Pagoda in Dengfeng Country, Henan. This curved, circle-based pagoda was built in 523 during the Northern Wei dynasty, and has survived for 15 centuries. Much like the later pagodas found during the following Tang dynasty, this temple featured tiers of eaves encircling its frame, as well as a spire crowning the top. Its walls are 2.5 metres (8 ft 2 in) thick, with a ground floor diameter of 10.6 metres (35 ft). Another early brick pagoda is the Sui dynasty Guoqing Pagoda built in 597. The brick Zushi Pagoda of Foguang Temple in Shanxi was built either during the Northern Wei dynasty (386–534) or Northern Qi dynasty (550–577).

==== Stone ====
The earliest large-scale stone pagoda is a Four Gates Pagoda at Licheng, Shandong, built in 611 during the Sui dynasty. Like the Songyue Pagoda, it also features a spire at its top, and is built in the pavilion style.

==== Brick and stone ====
One of the earliest brick and stone pagodas was a three-storey construction built in the (first) Jin dynasty (266–420), by Wang Jun of Xiangyang. However, it is now destroyed.

Brick and stone went on to dominate Tang, Song, Liao and Jin dynasty pagoda construction. An example is the Giant Wild Goose Pagoda (652 AD), built during the early Tang dynasty. The Porcelain Pagoda of Nanjing has been one of the most famous brick and stone pagoda in China throughout history. The Zhou dynasty started making the ancient pagodas about 3,500 years ago.

== De-emphasis over time ==
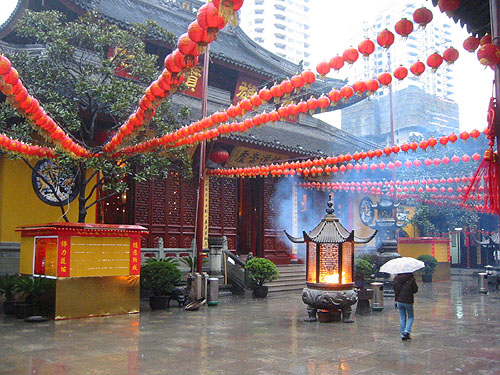
Jade Buddha Temple in Shanghai follows the Song dynasty multi-courtyard design, and does not feature a pagoda. The main hall is at the center.

Pagodas, in keeping with the tradition of the White Horse Temple, were generally placed in the center of temples until the Sui and Tang dynasties. During the Tang, the importance of the main hall was elevated and the pagoda was moved beside the hall, or out of the temple compound altogether. In the early Tang, Daoxuan wrote a Standard Design for Buddhist Temple Construction in which the main hall replaced the pagoda as the center of the temple.

The design of temples was also influenced by the use of traditional Chinese residences as shrines, after they were philanthropically donated by the wealthy or the pious. In such pre-configured spaces, building a central pagoda might not have been either desirable or possible.

In the Song dynasty (960–1279), the Chan (Zen) sect developed a new 'seven part structure' for temples. The seven parts—the Buddha hall, dharma hall, monks' quarters, depository, gate, pure land hall and toilet facilities—completely exclude pagodas, and can be seen to represent the final triumph of the traditional Chinese palace/courtyard system over the original central-pagoda tradition established 1000 years earlier by the White Horse Temple in 67. Although they were built outside of the main temple itself, large pagodas in the tradition of the past were still built. This includes the two Ming dynasty pagodas of Famen Temple and the Chongwen Pagoda in Jingyang of Shaanxi.

A prominent, later example of converting a palace to a temple is Beijing's Yonghe Temple, which was the residence of Yongzheng Emperor before he ascended the throne. It was donated for use as a lamasery after his death in 1735.

== Styles of eras ==
=== Han dynasty ===
Examples of Han dynasty era tower architecture predating Buddhist influence and the full-fledged Chinese pagoda can be seen in the four pictures below. Michael Loewe writes that during the Han dynasty (202 BC – 220 AD) period, multi-storied towers were erected for religious purposes, as astronomical observatories, as watchtowers, or as ornate buildings that were believed to attract the favor of spirits, deities, and immortals. Sinologist Joseph Needham wrote that, in addition to the Indian stupa, Chinese pagodas took inspiration from elevated rammed earth platforms as well as these previous Han-era timber watchtowers and multistory residential apartments depicted in tomb models.

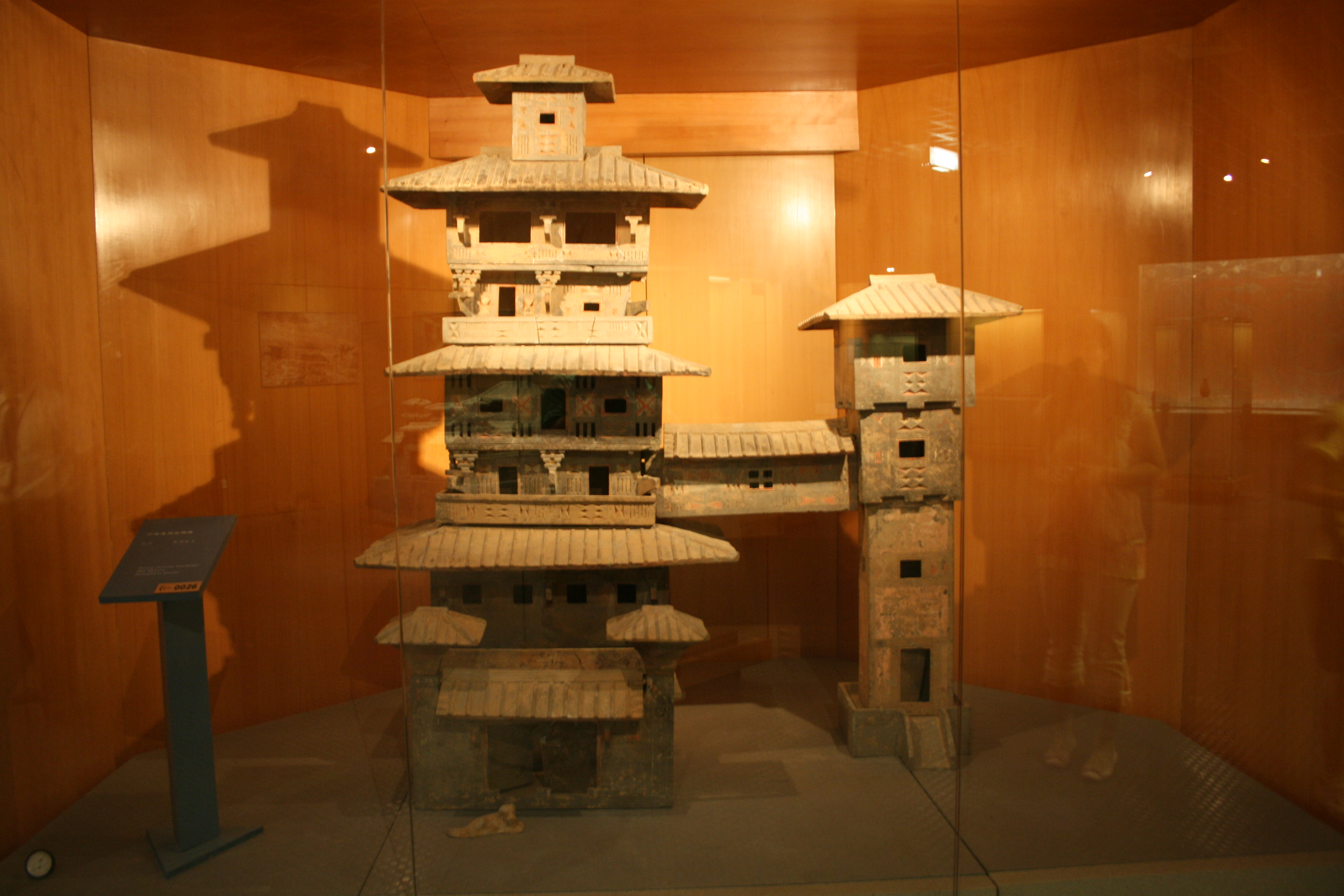
Ancient Chinese model of two residential towers, made of earthenware during the Han dynasty, 2nd century BC to 2nd century AD, excavated by archaeologists in 1993.

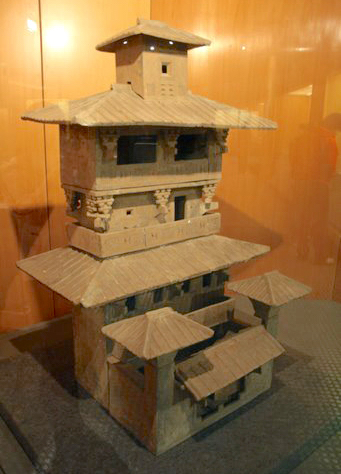
Side view of a Han pottery tower model with a mid-floor balcony and a courtyard gatehouse flanked by smaller towers; the dougong support brackets are clearly visible.

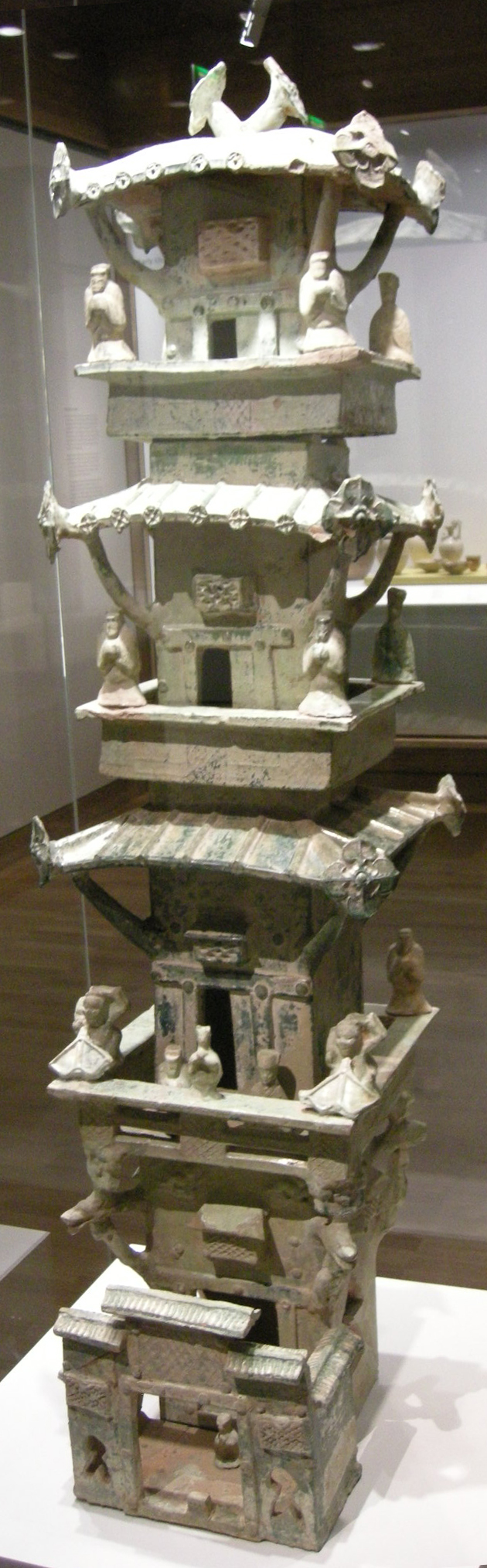
A Western-Han model of a watchtower with human figures on its balconies (including crossbowmen) and a gatehouse and courtyard on the first floor.

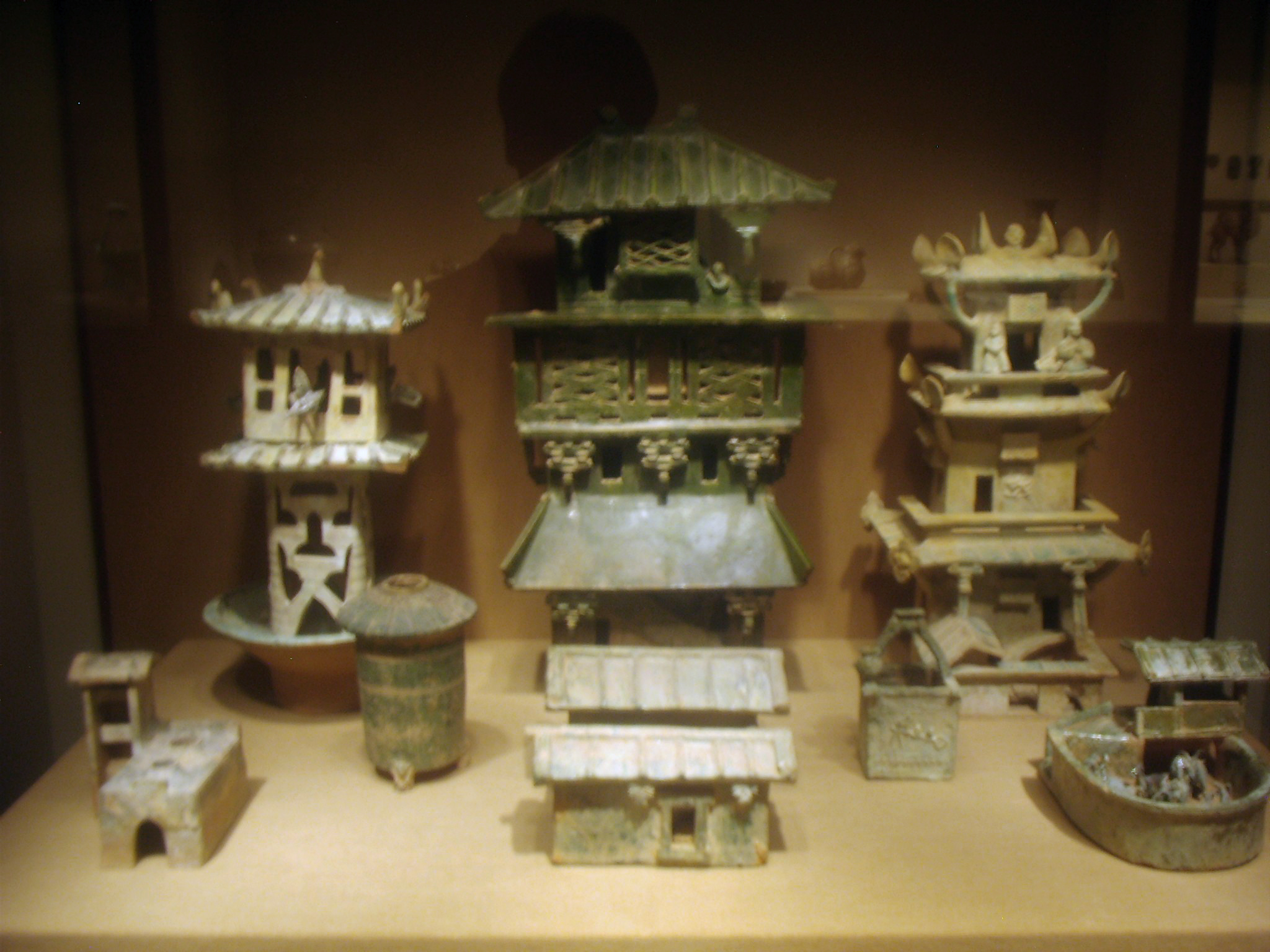
Among a large set of architectural models, three Eastern Han dynasty watchtowers stand in the rear of this display.

=== Sui and Tang ===
Pagodas built during the Sui and Tang dynasty usually had a square base, with a few exceptions such as the Daqin Pagoda:

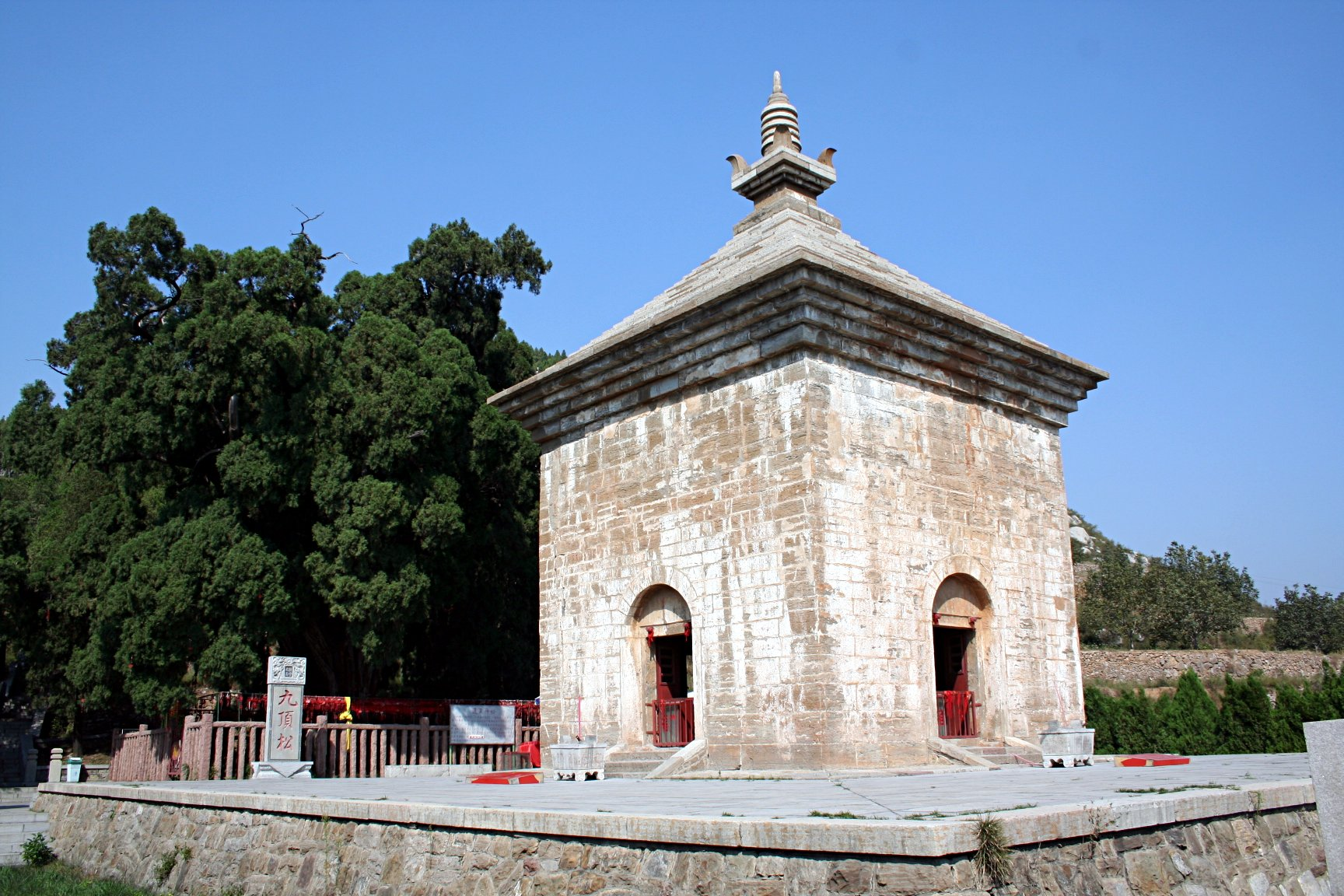
Four Gates Pagoda, built in 611

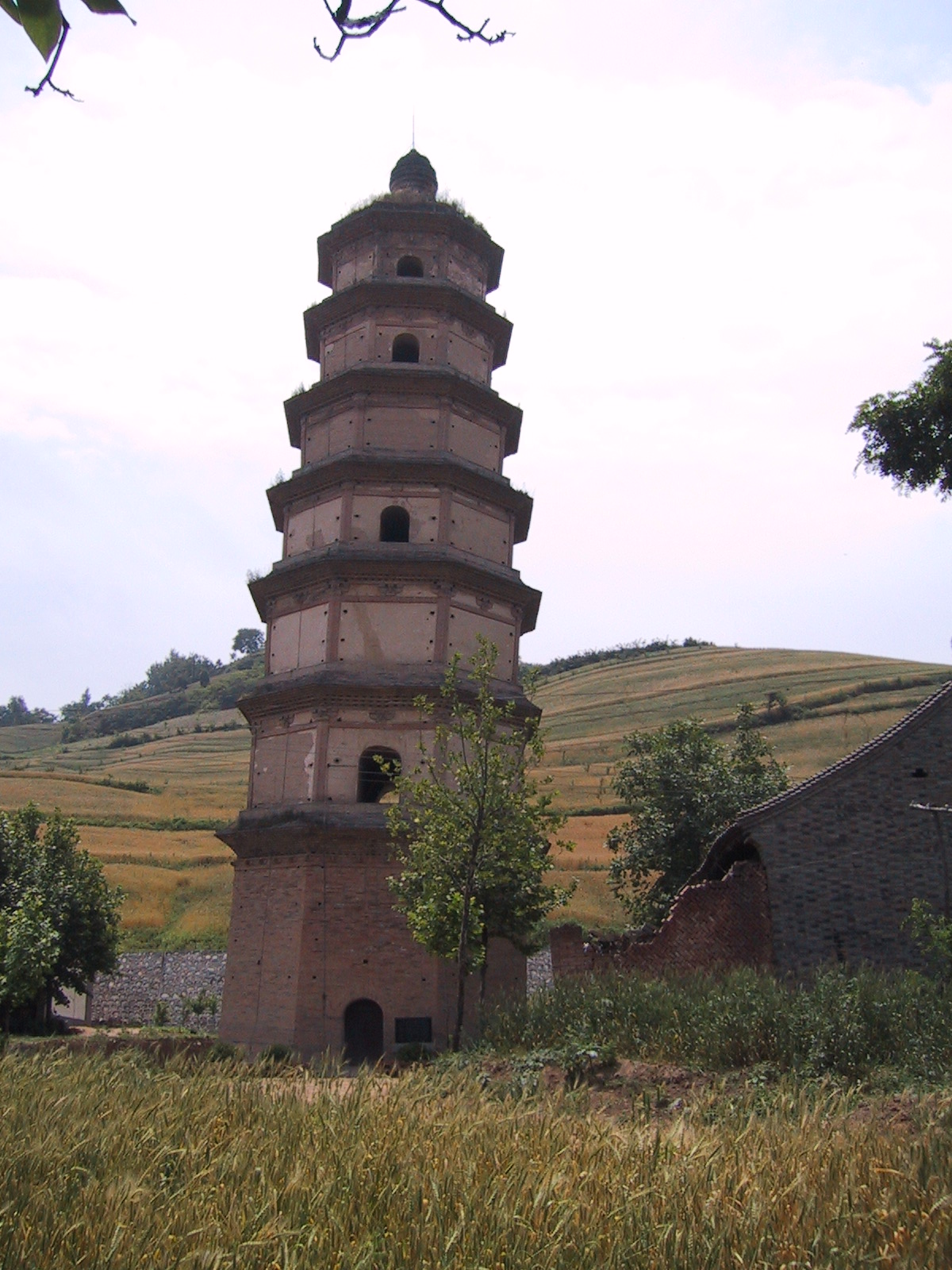
The Daqin Pagoda, built in 640

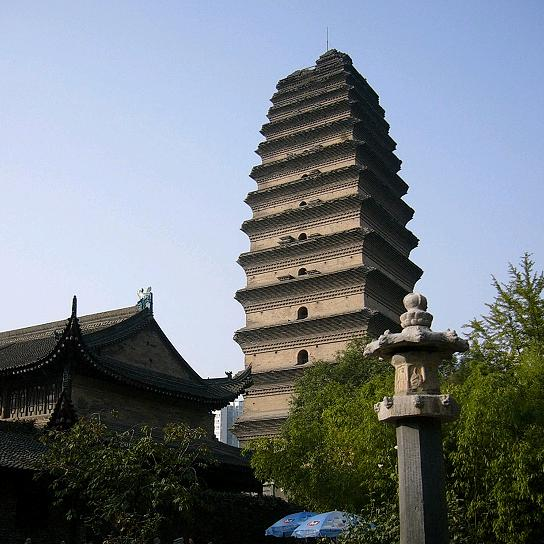
The Small Wild Goose Pagoda, built in 709

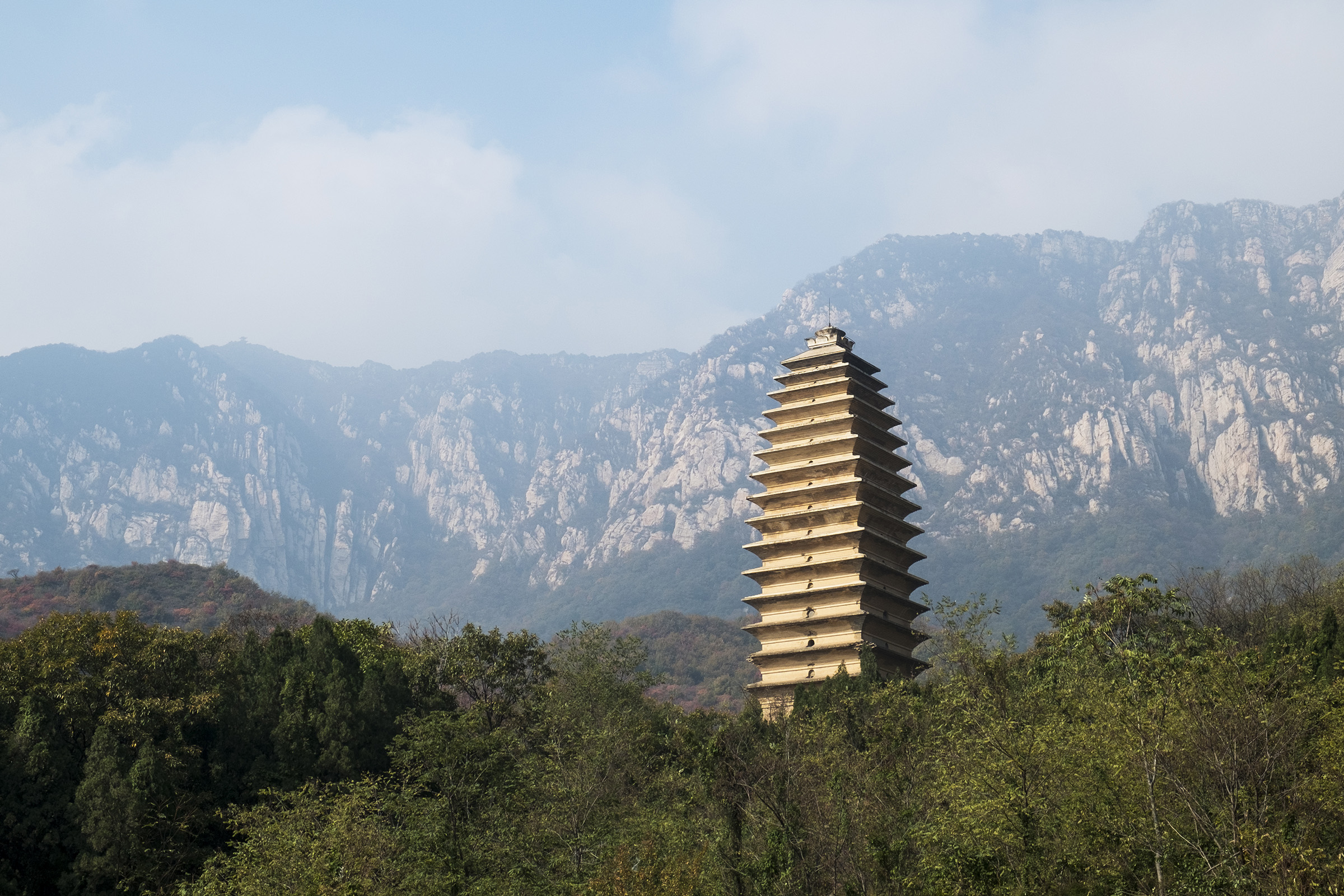
Fawang Temple Pagoda, built in early 8th century

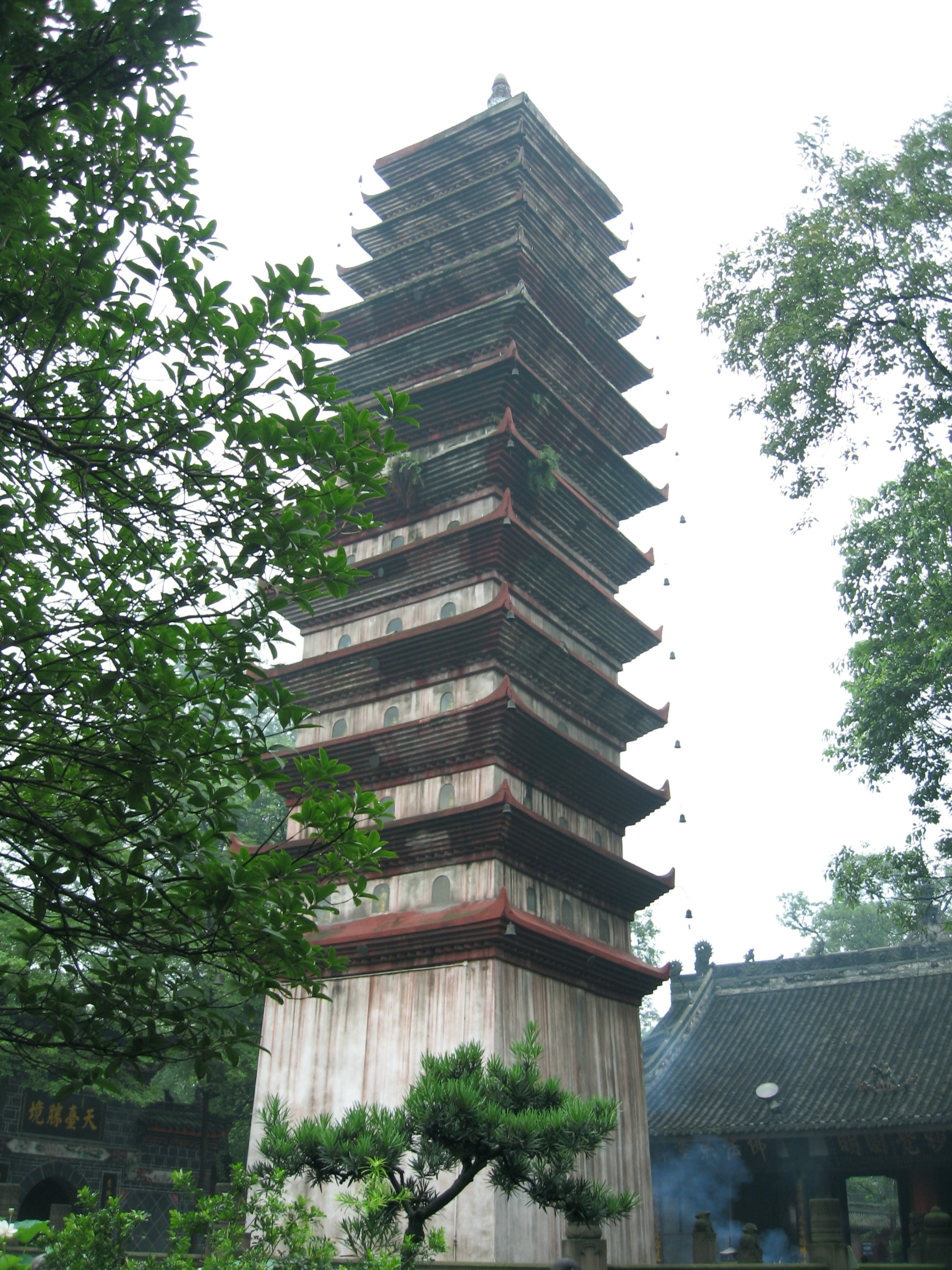
Pagoda of the Baoguang Temple, built between 862 and 888

=== Dali kingdom ===
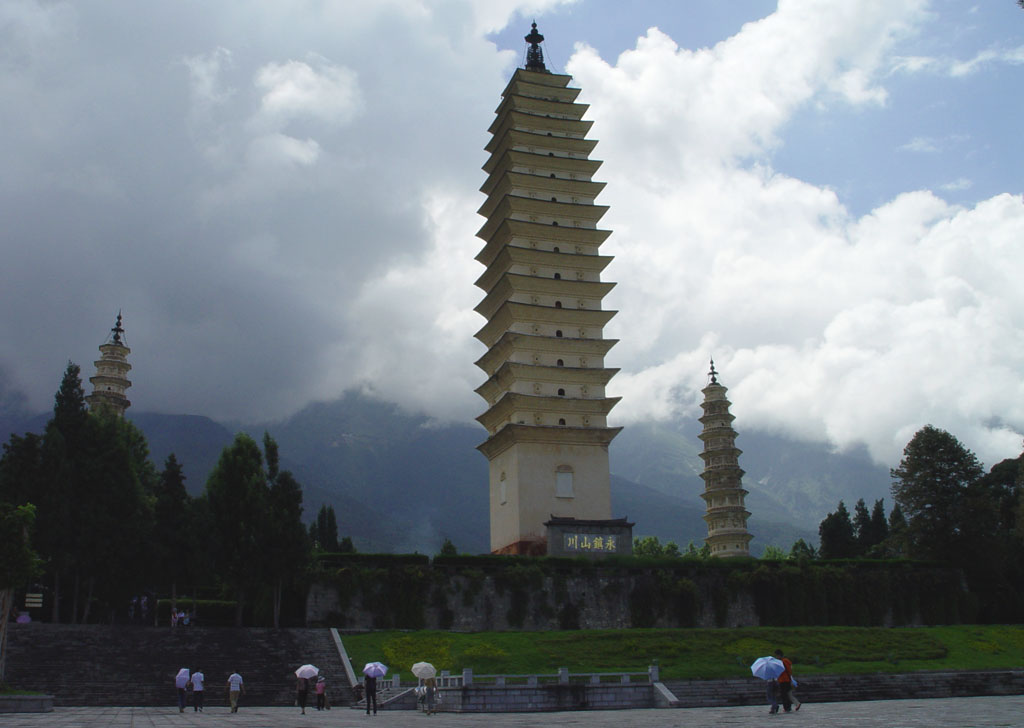
The Three Pagodas, 9th and 10th centuries

=== Song, Liao, Jin, Yuan ===
Pagodas of the Five Dynasties, Northern and Southern Song, Liao, Jin, and Yuan dynasties incorporated many new styles, with a greater emphasis on hexagonal and octagonal bases for pagodas:

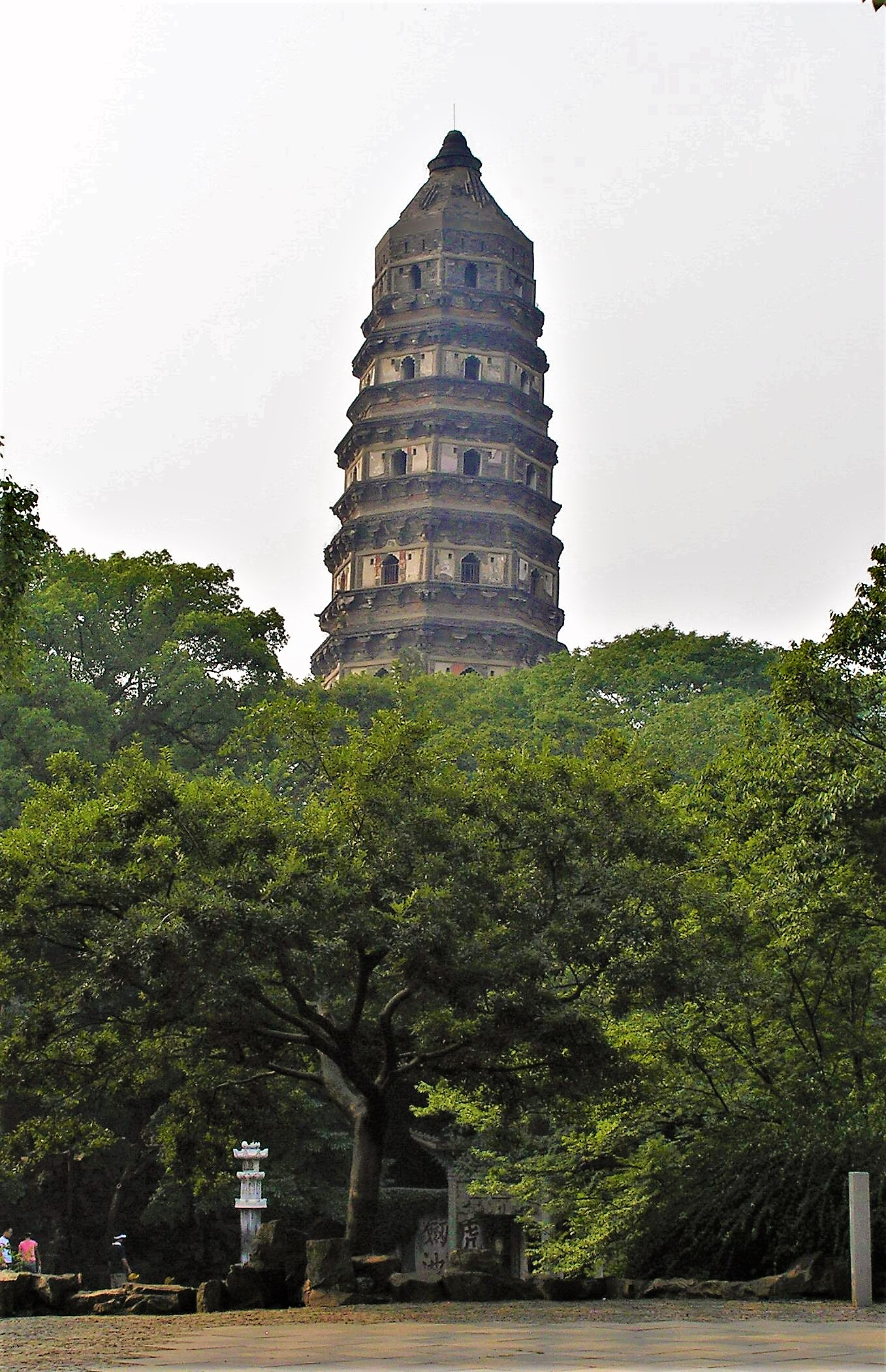
The Huqiu Tower, built in 961

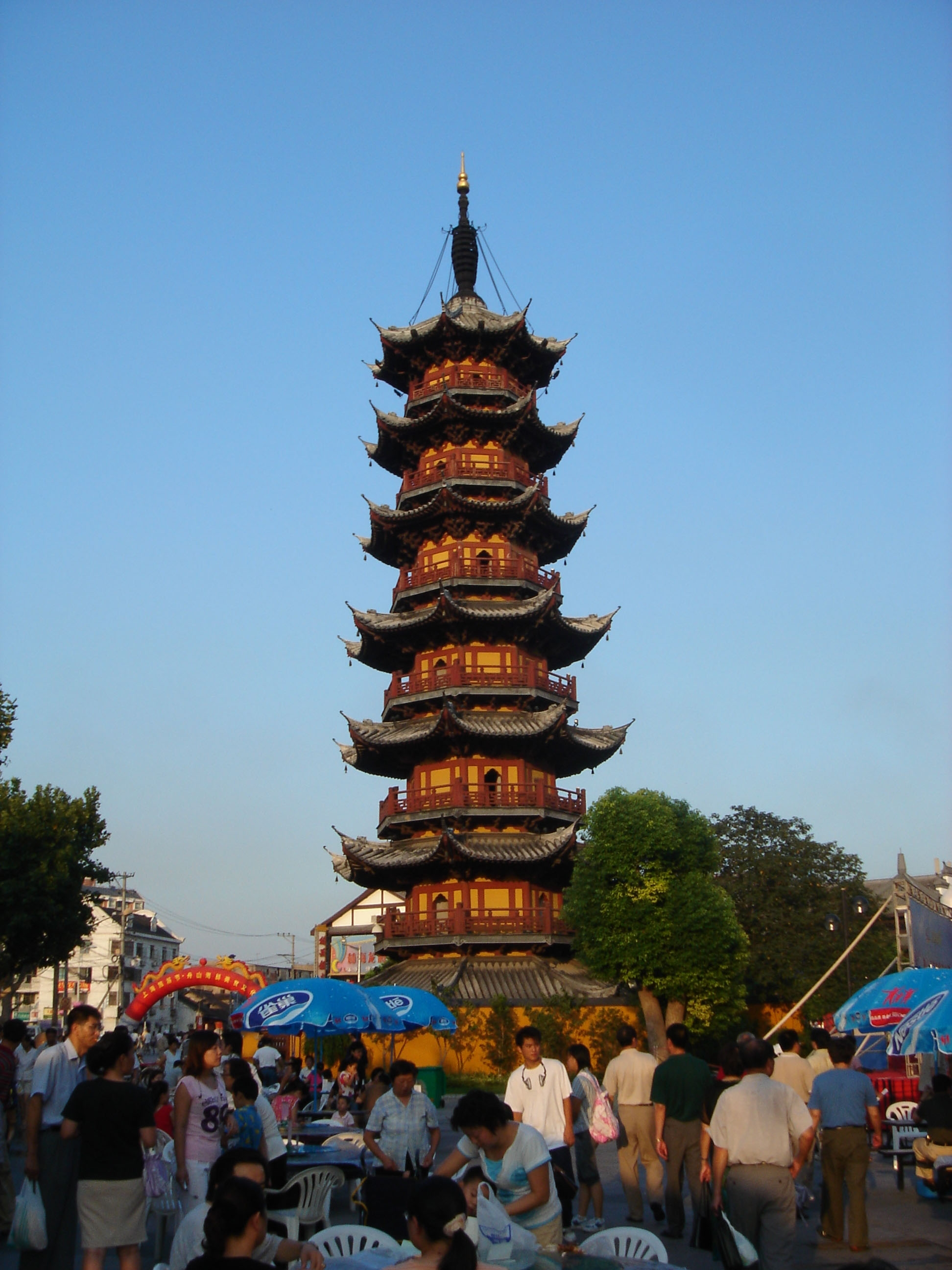
Longhua Pagoda, built in 977

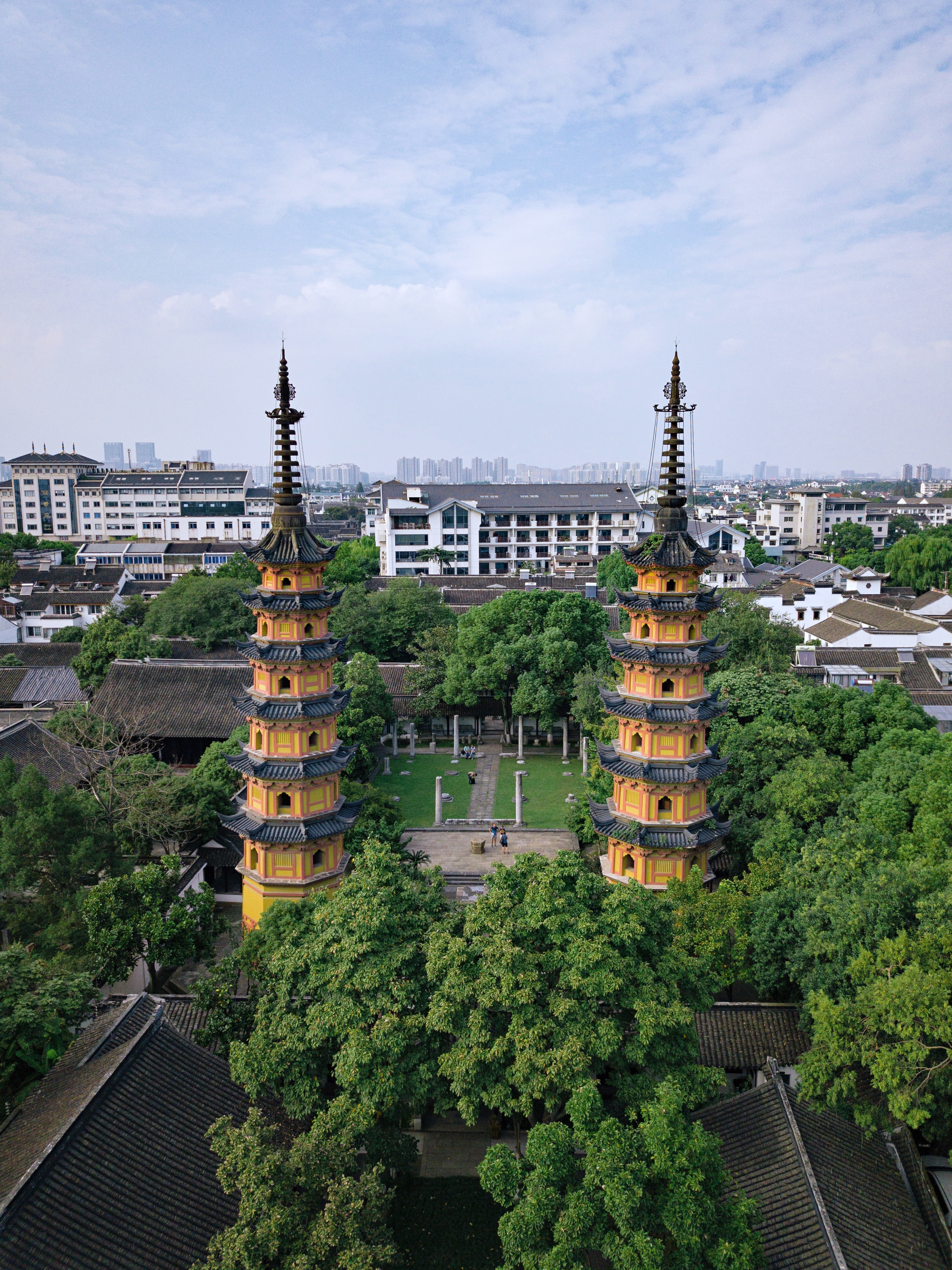
Luohanyuan Twin Pagodas, built in 982

Ruiguang Pagoda, built in 1009

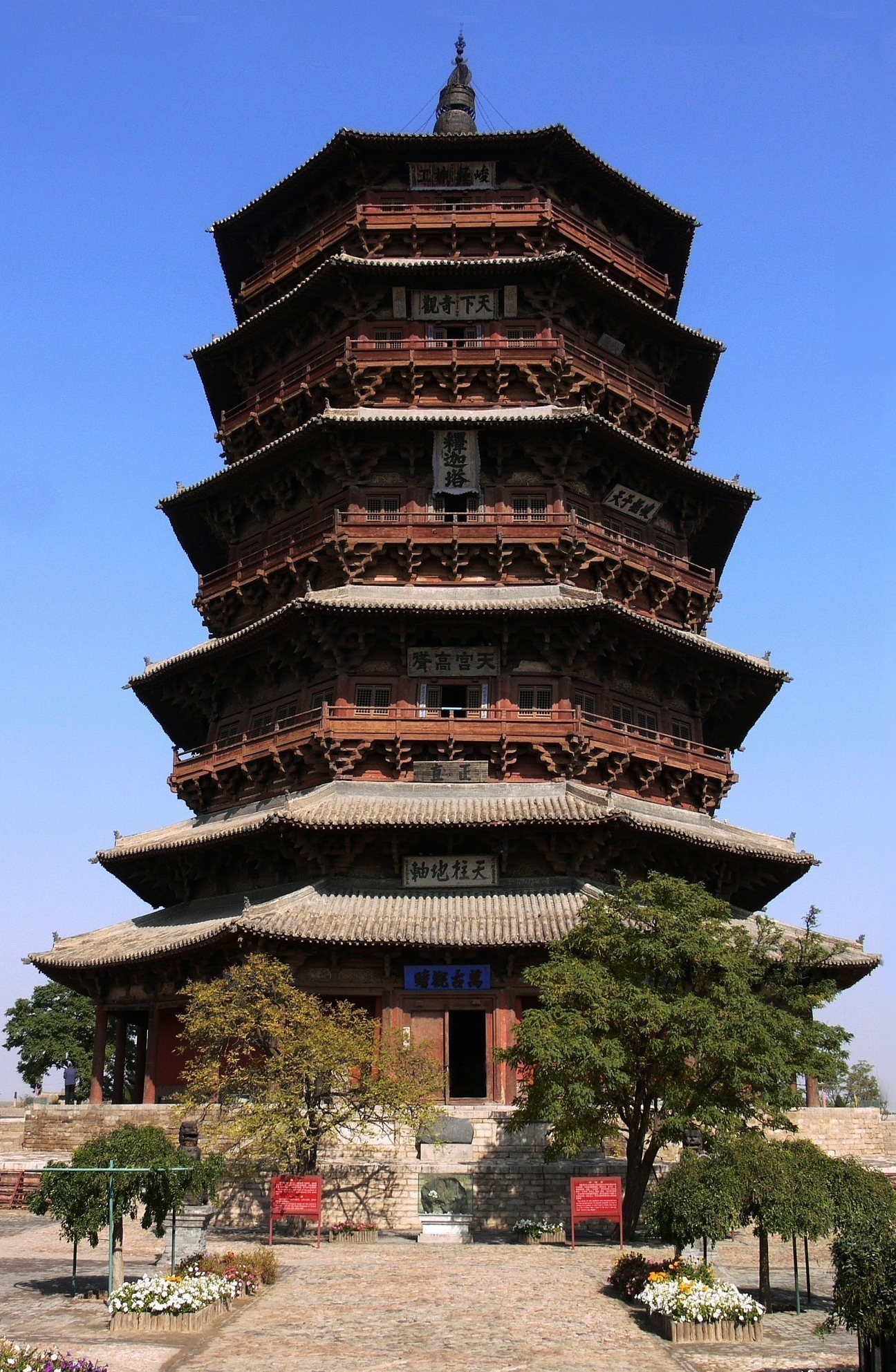
Pagoda of Fogong Temple, built in 1056

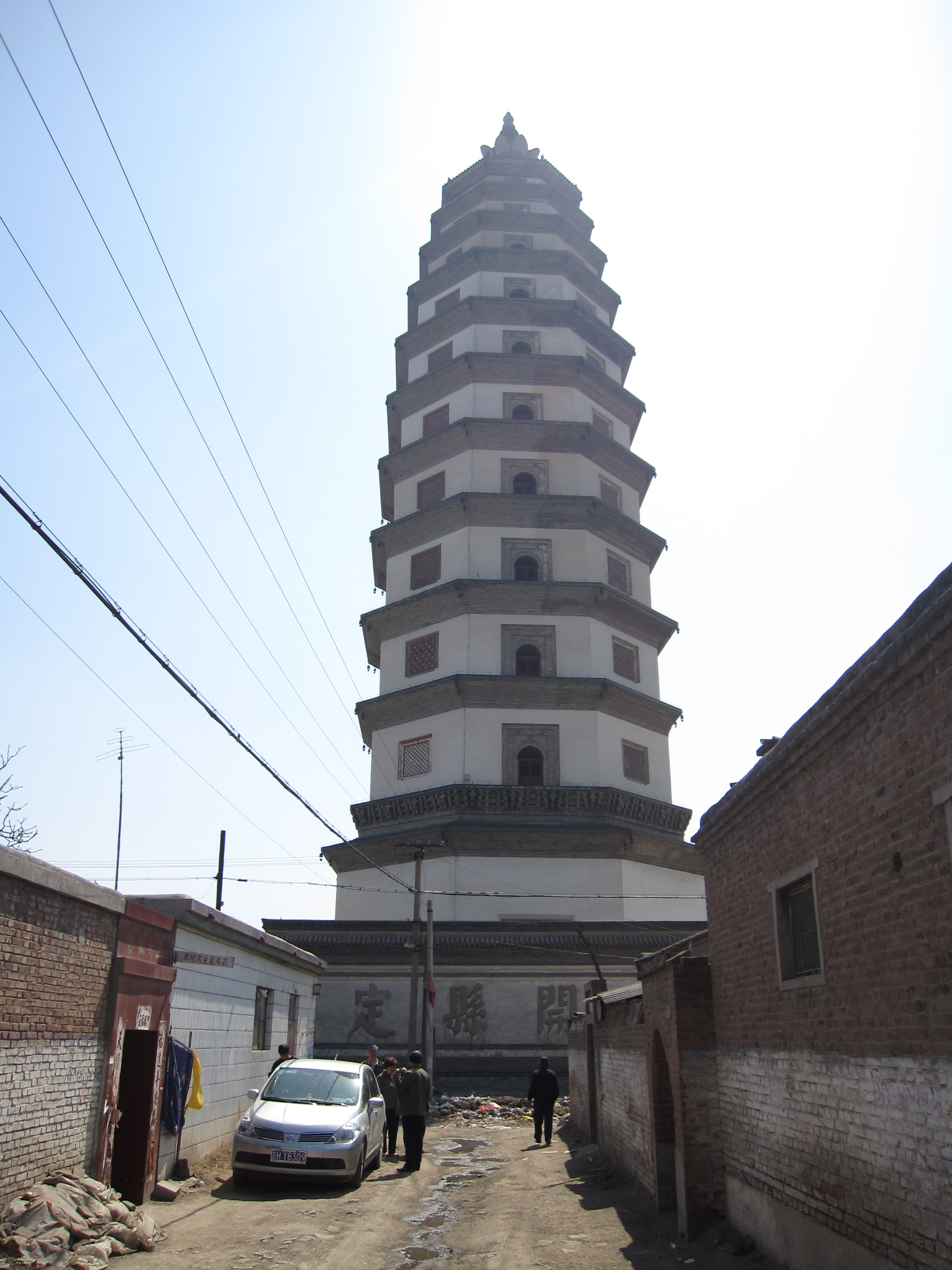
The Liaodi Pagoda, built in 1055

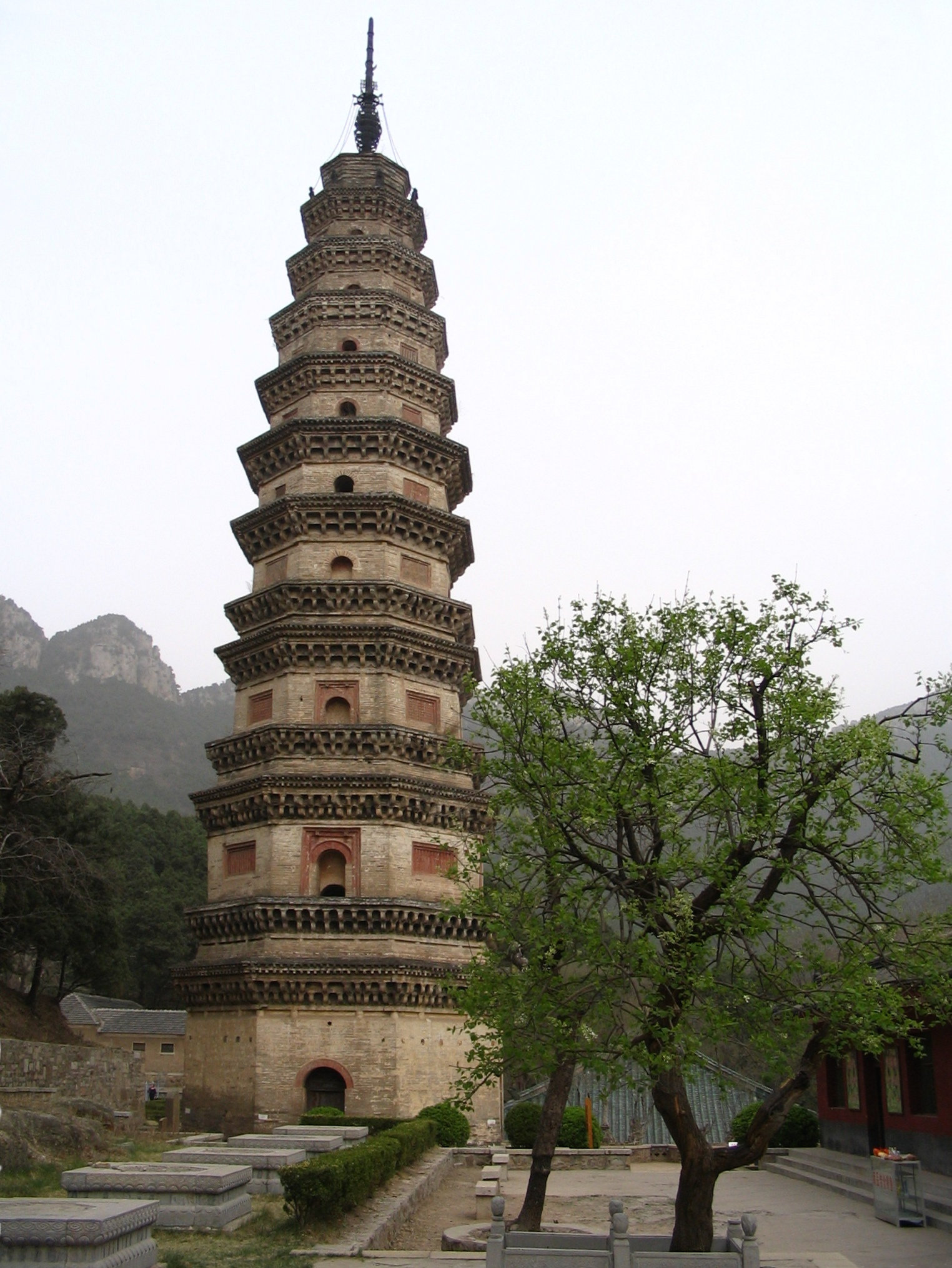
Pizhi Pagoda, built by 1063

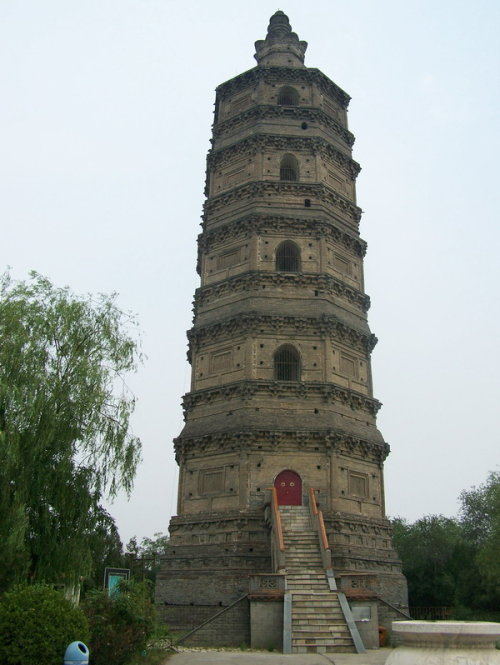
Haotian Pagoda, built in 1103

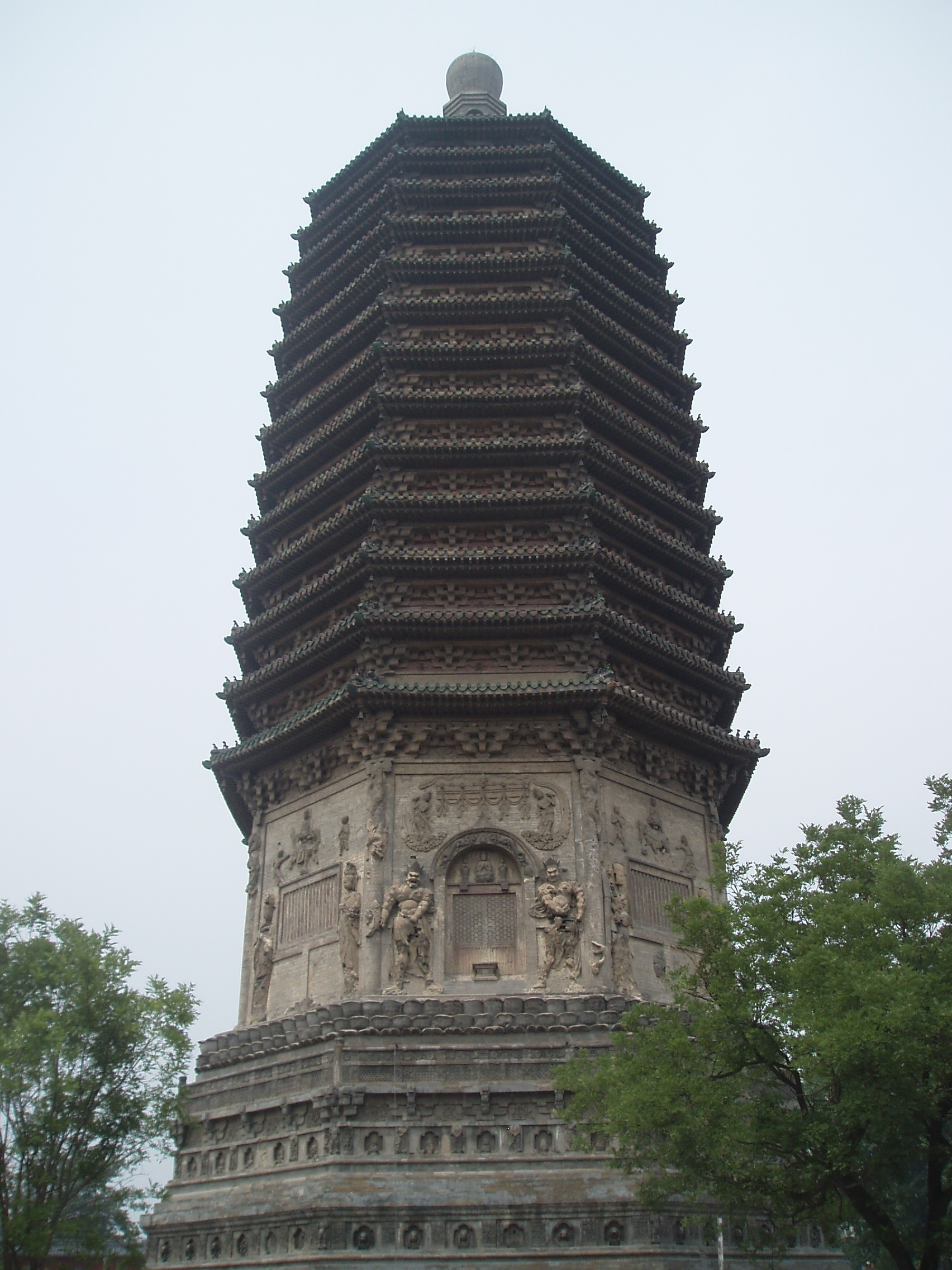
Pagoda of Tianning Temple in Beijing, 1120

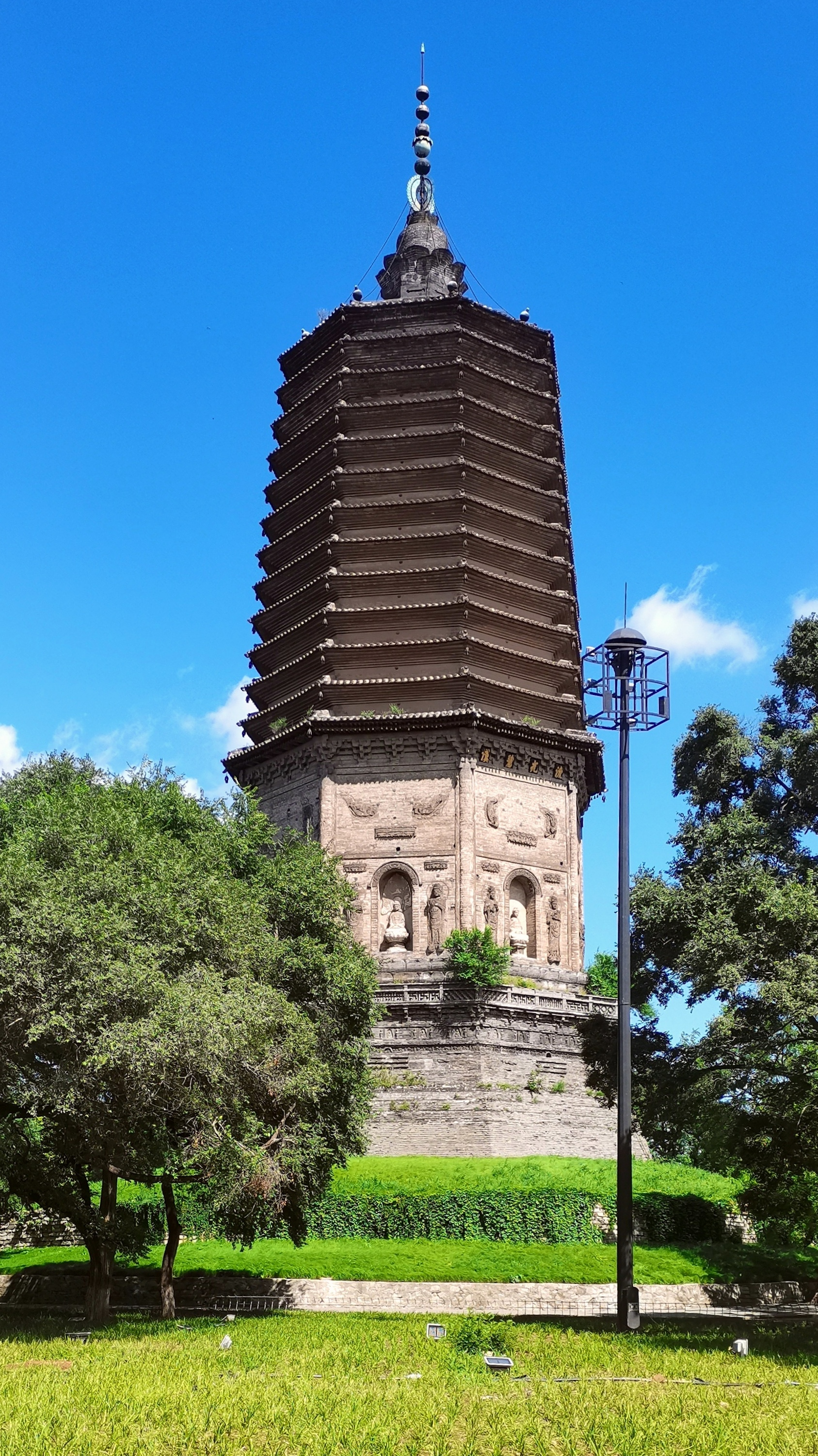
White Pagoda of Liaoyang, built during the mid-late Liao dynasty

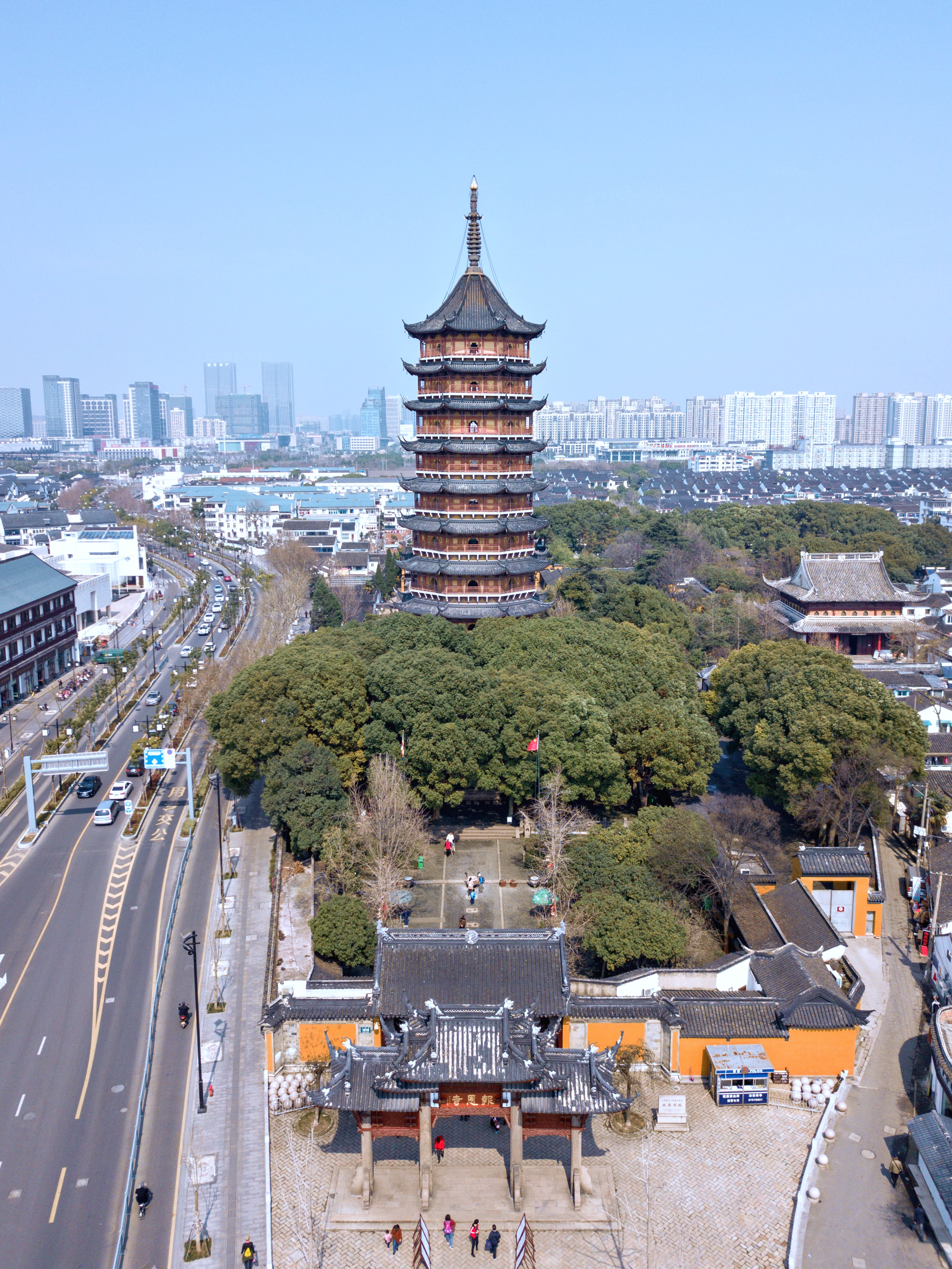
Beisi Pagoda, built in 1153

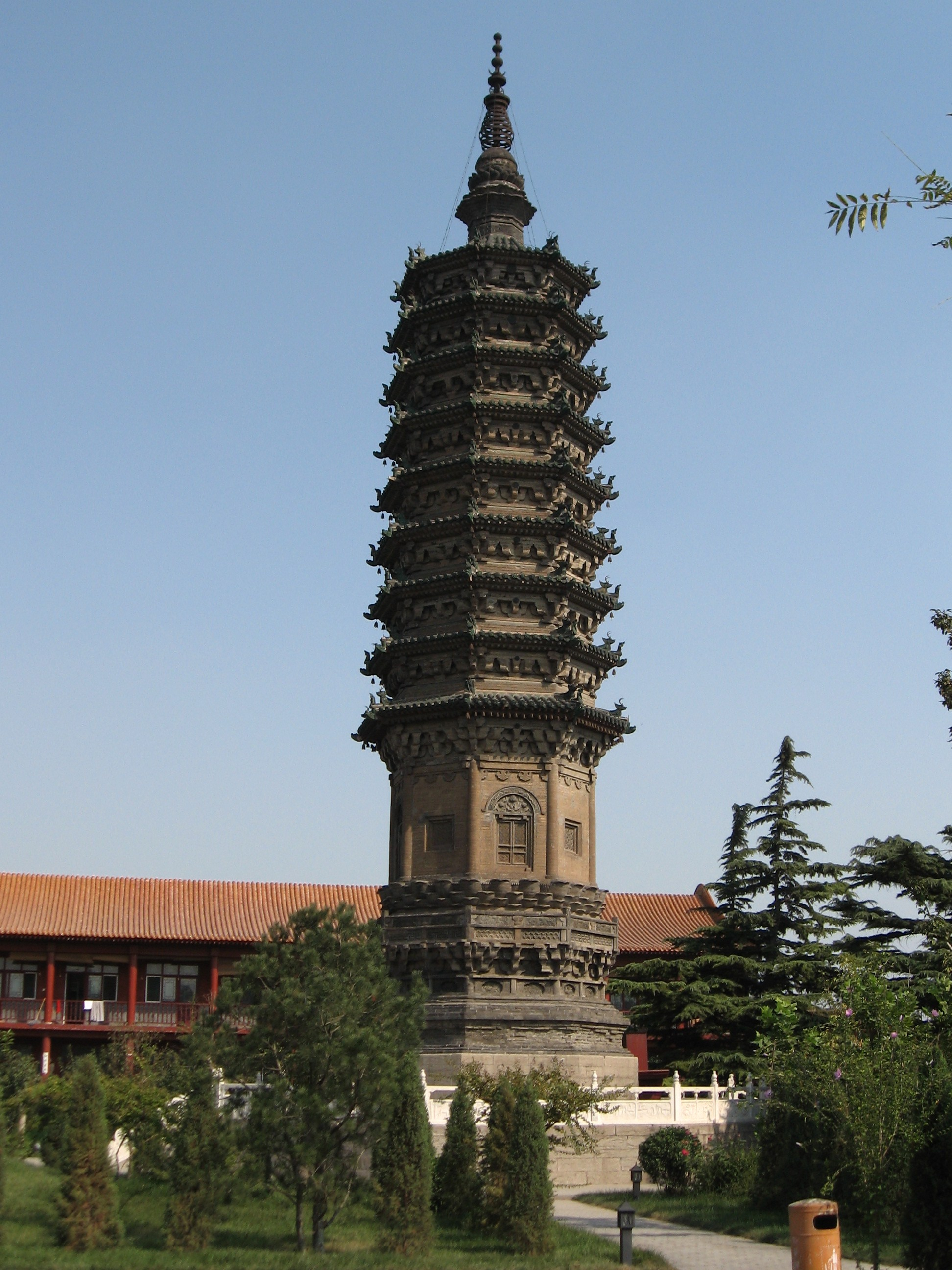
The Chengling Pagoda, built in 1189

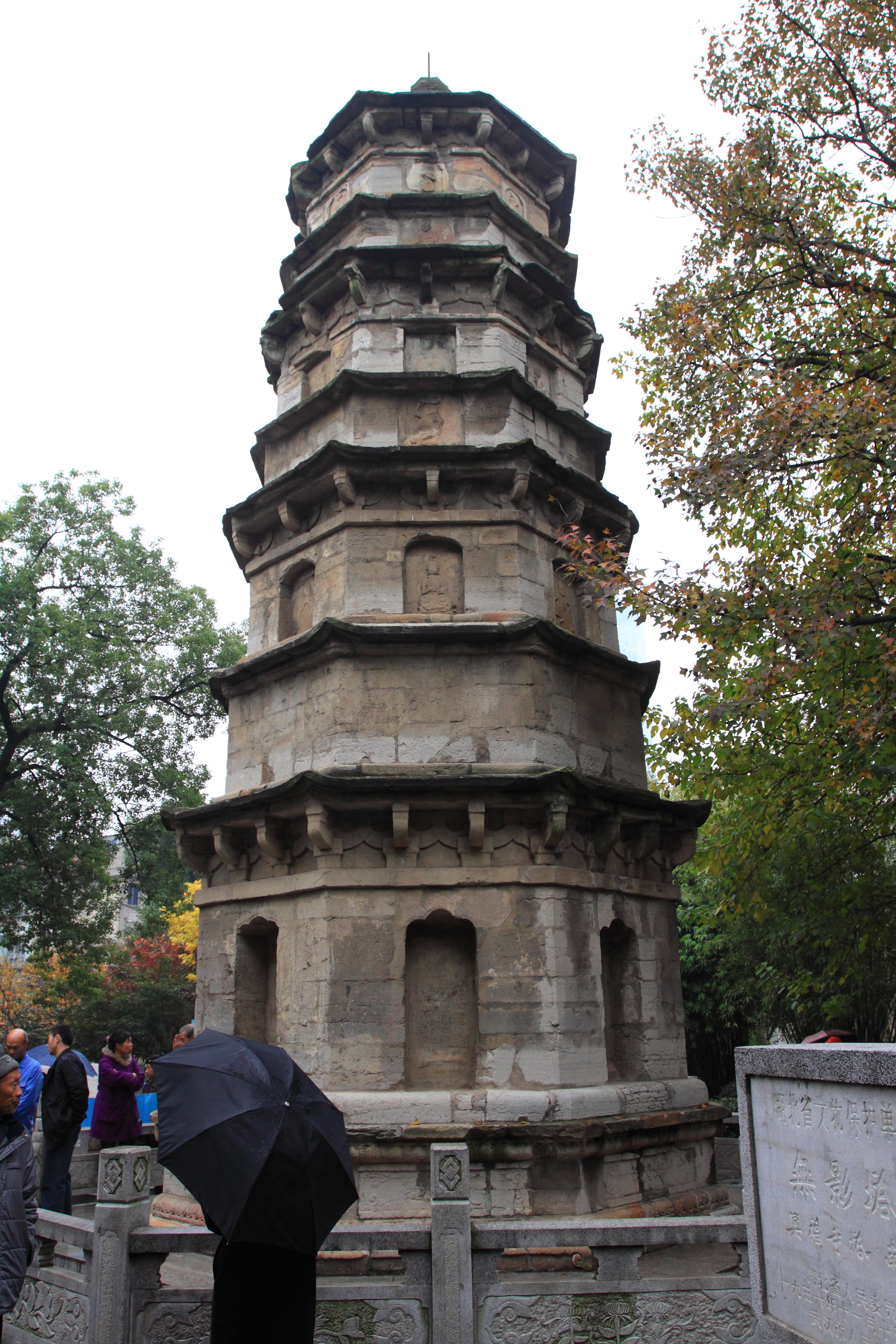
Wuying Pagoda, built in 1270

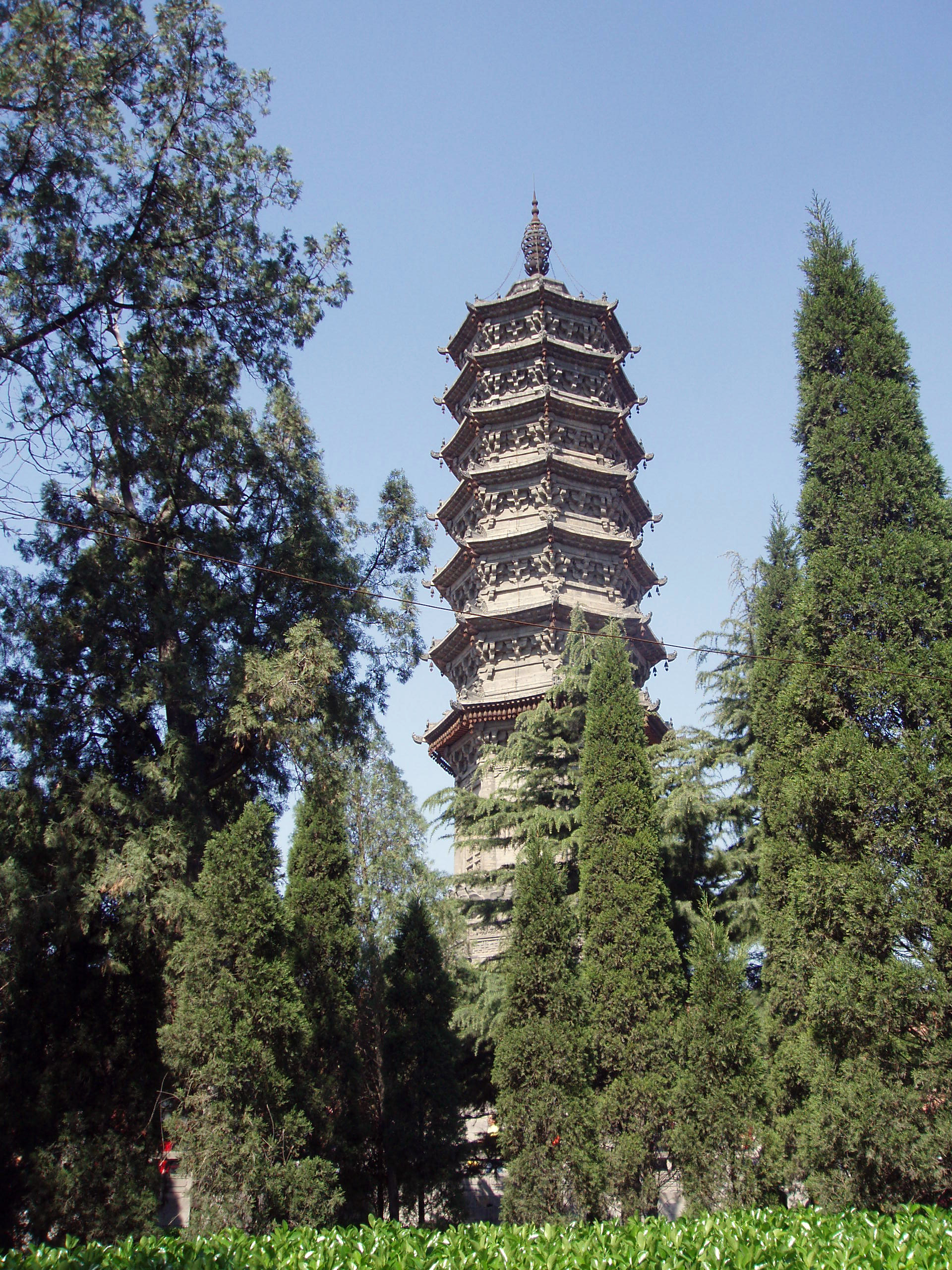
Pagoda of Bailin Temple, built by 1330

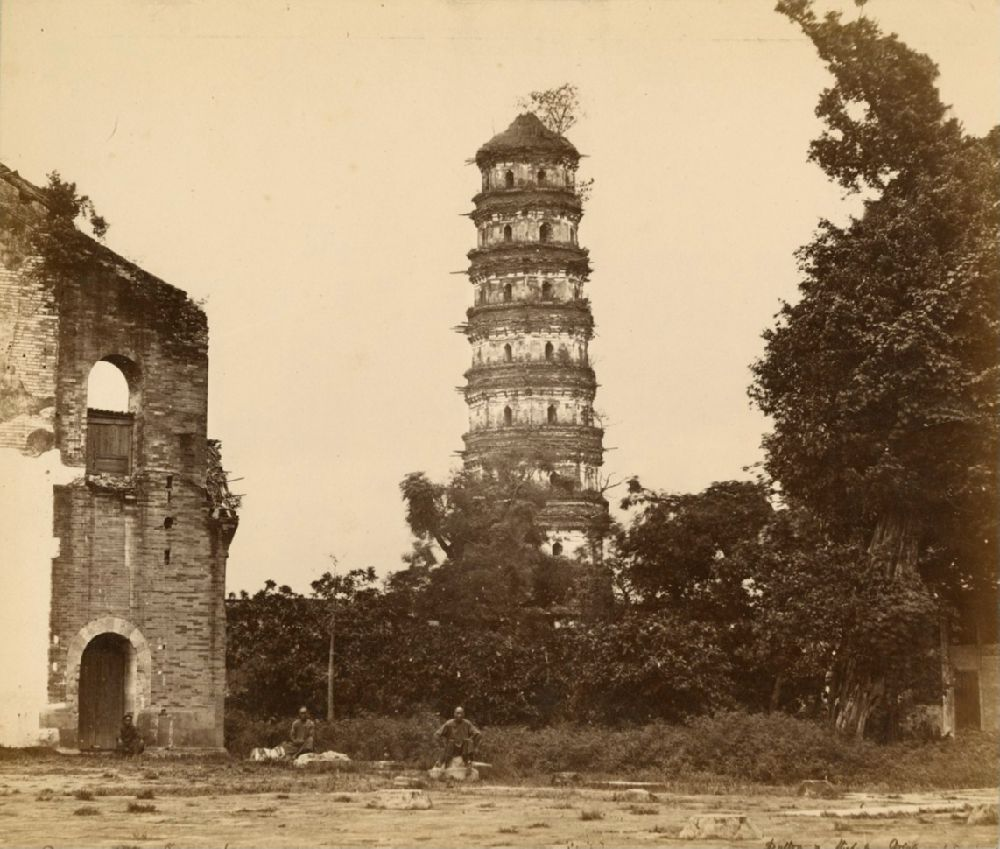
Photographer unknown, "Flower Pagoda Guangzhou," n.d., Department of Image Collections, National Gallery of Art Library, Washington, DC

=== Ming and Qing ===
Pagodas in the Ming and Qing dynasties generally inherited the styles of previous eras, although there were some minor variations:

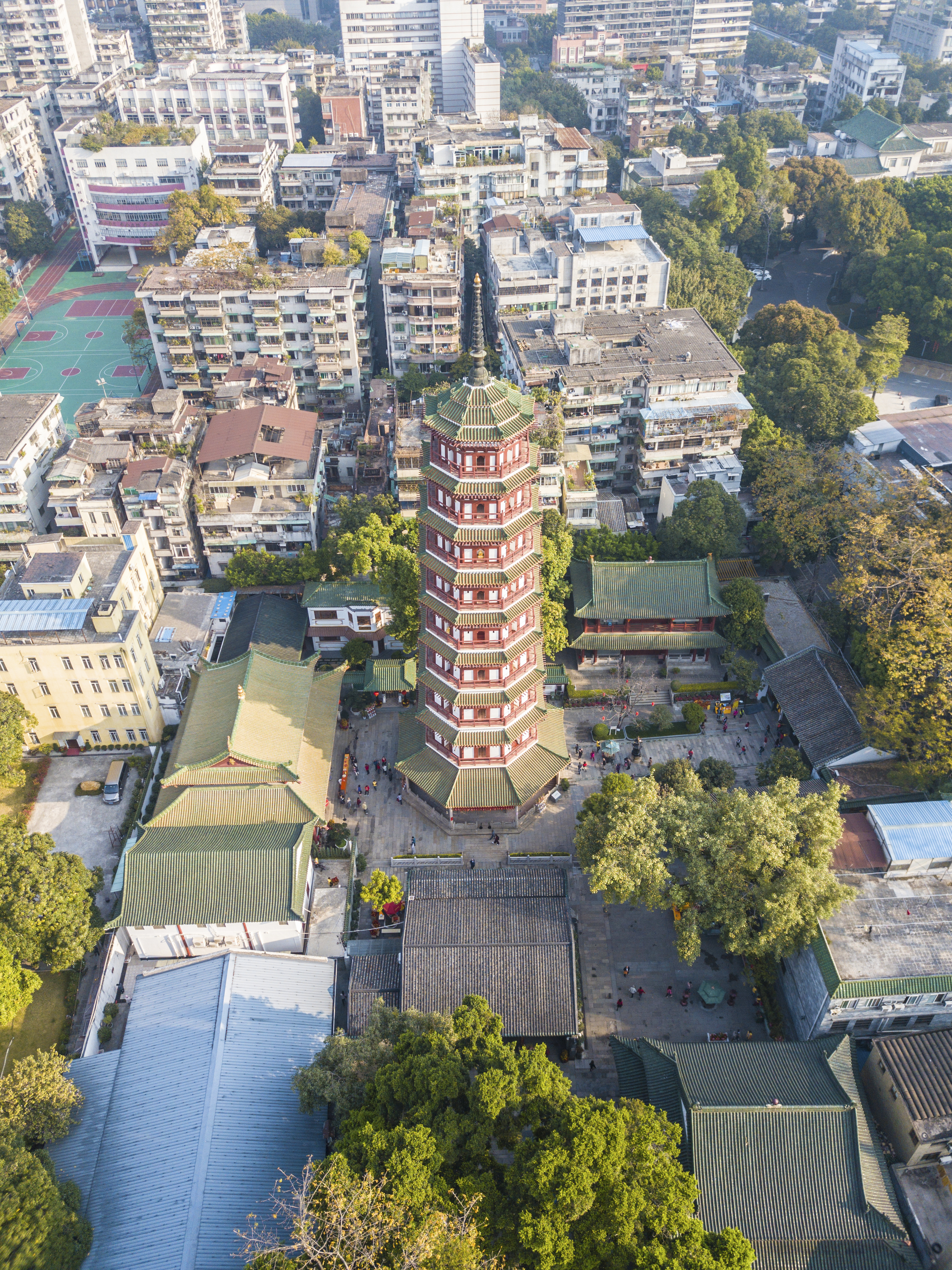
The Flower Pagoda of Liurong Temple, built in 1373

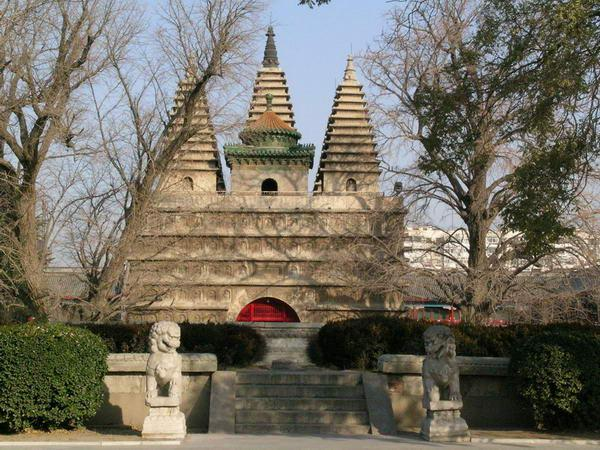
The Zhenjue Temple, built in 1473

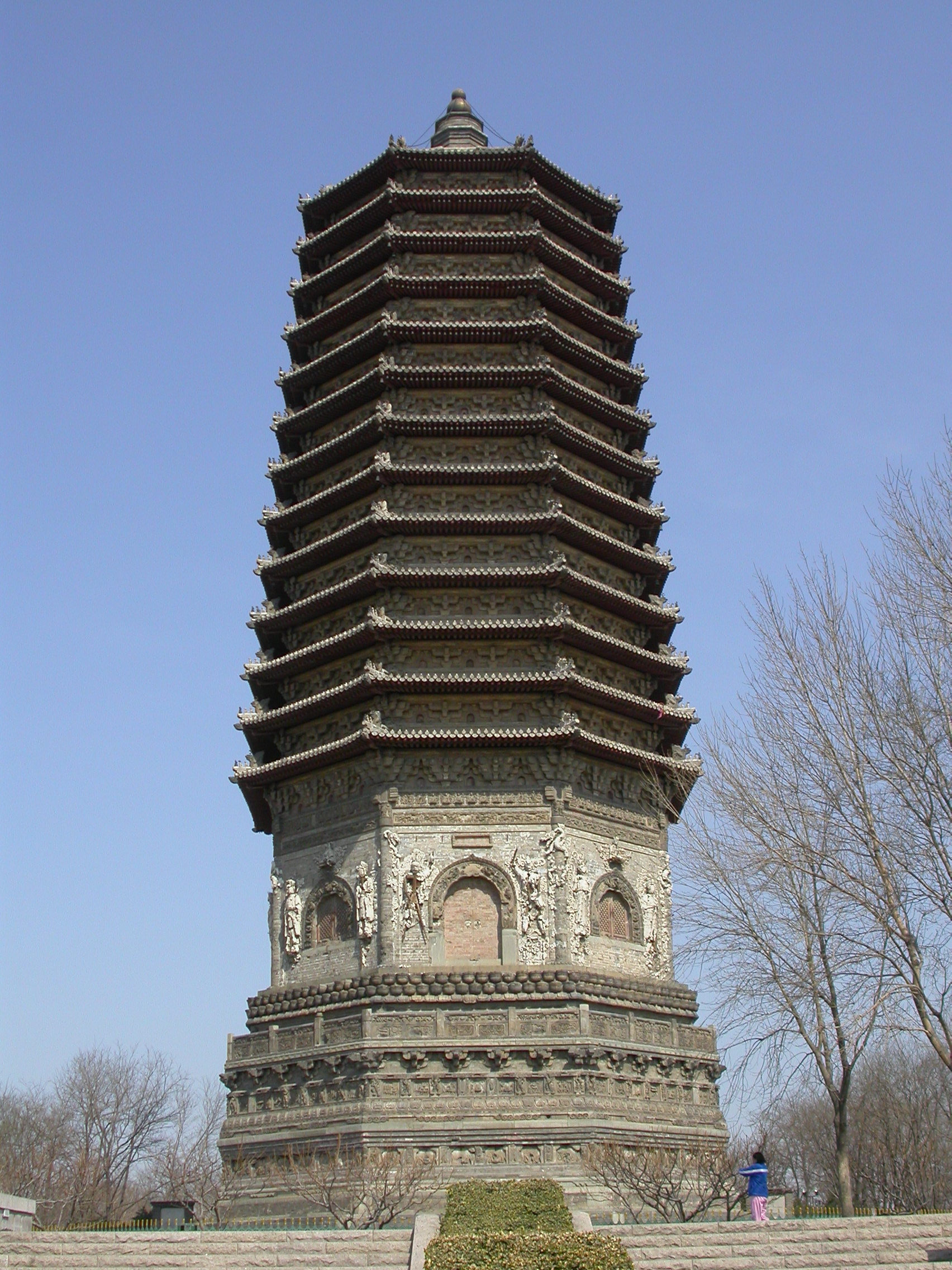
The Pagoda of Cishou Temple, built in 1576

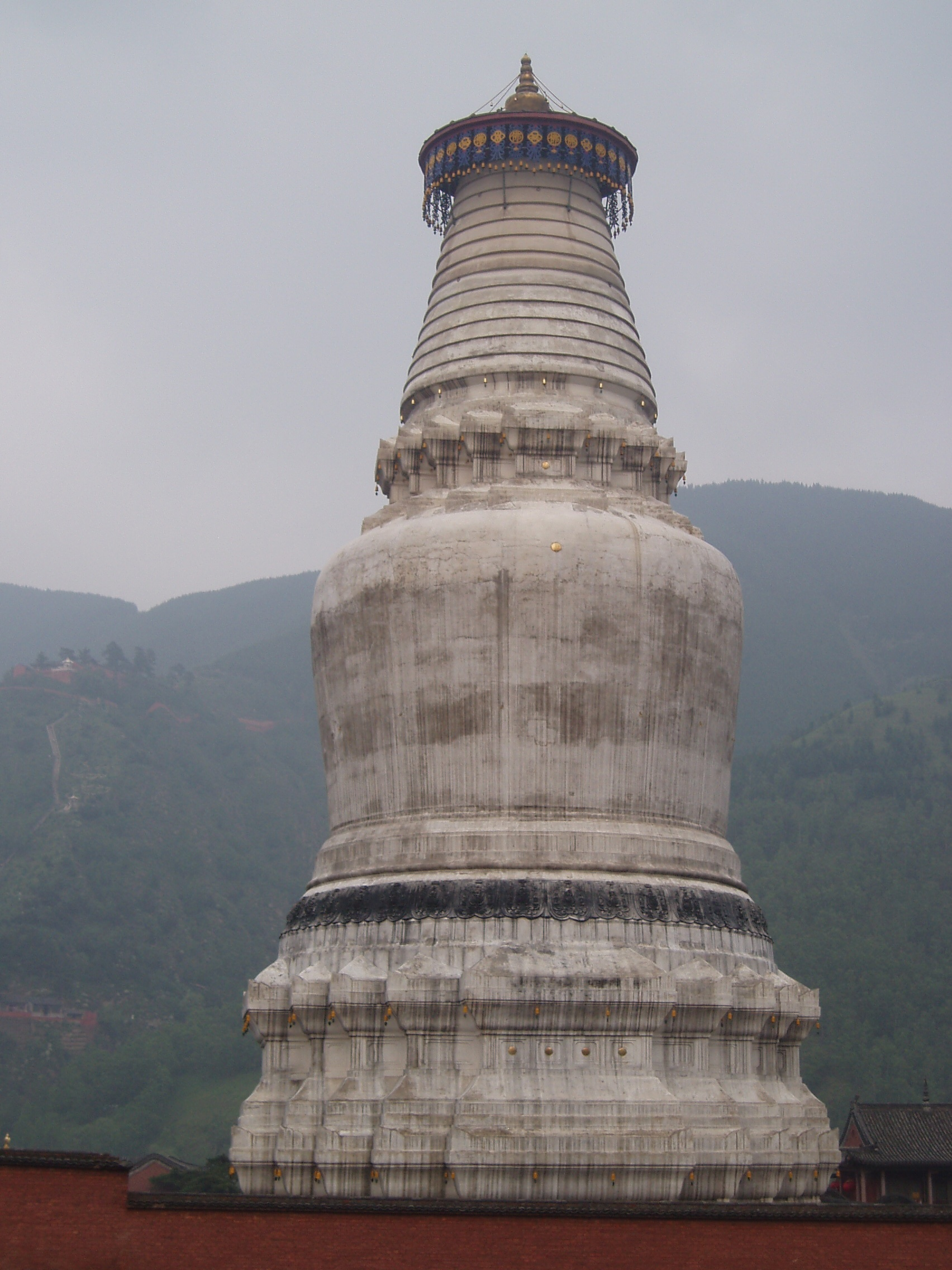
The Sarira Stupa of Tayuan Temple, built in 1582

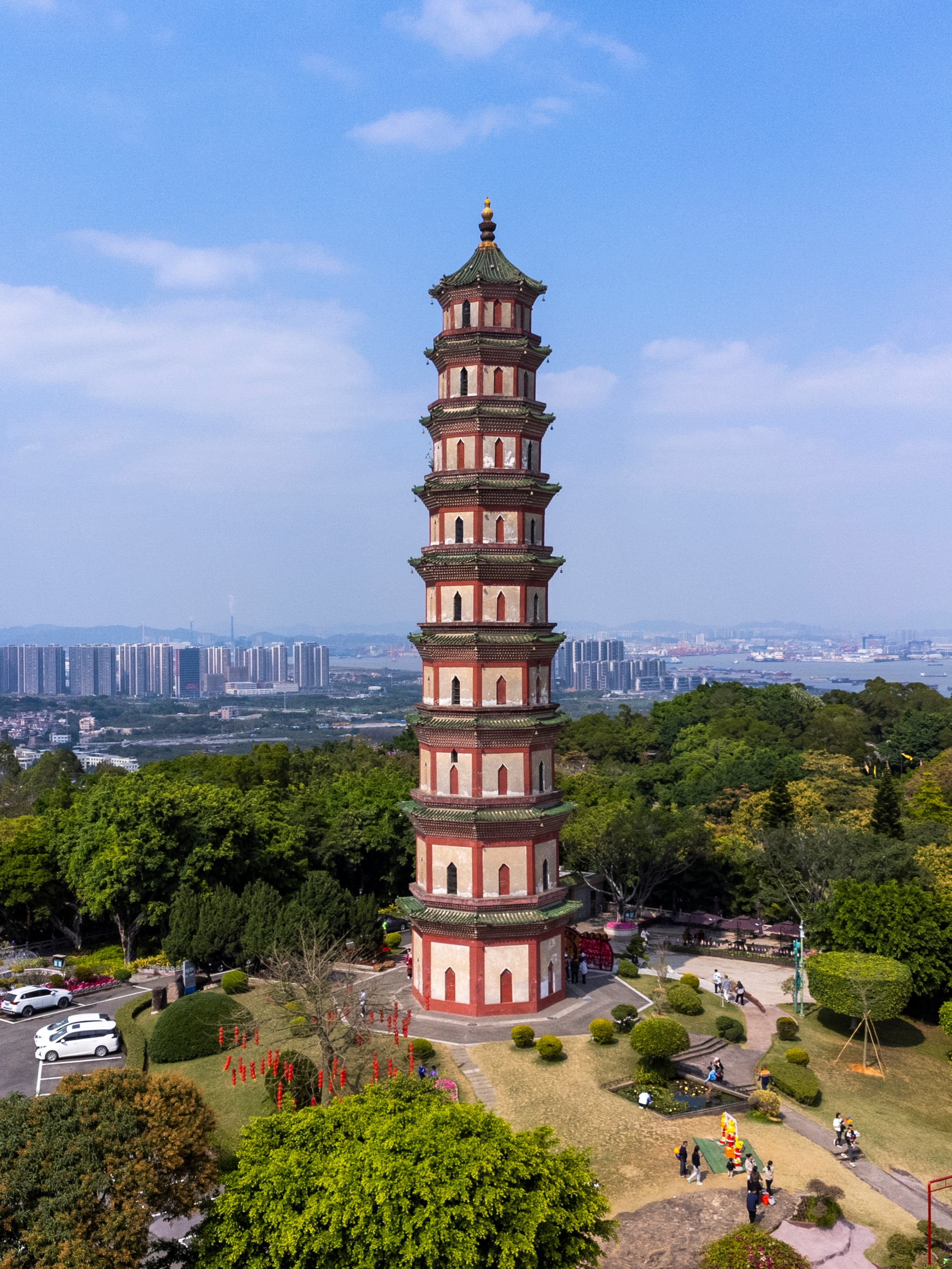
The Lianhua Pagoda of Lianhua Hills, built in 1612

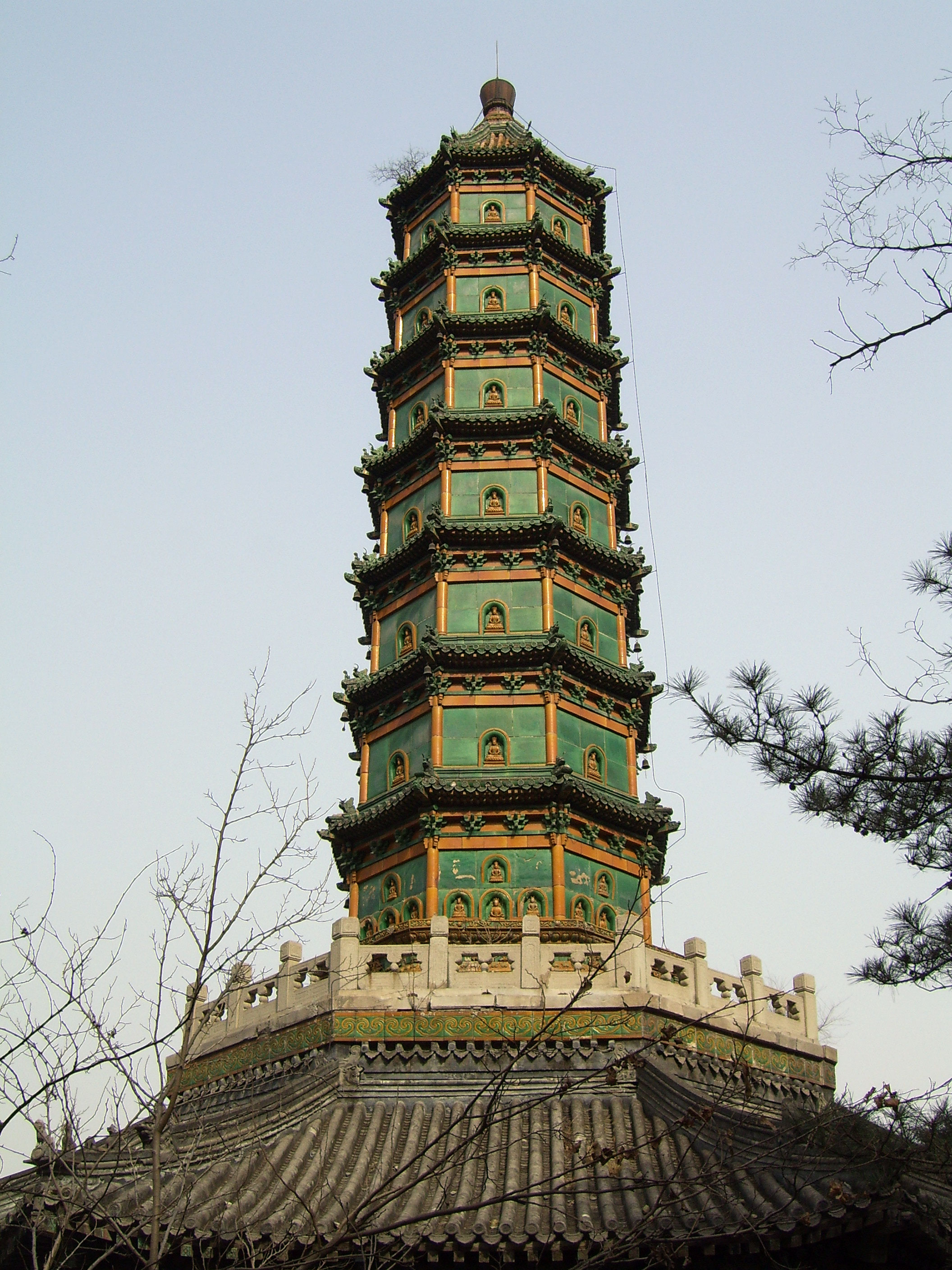
The Fragrant Hills Pagoda, built in 1780

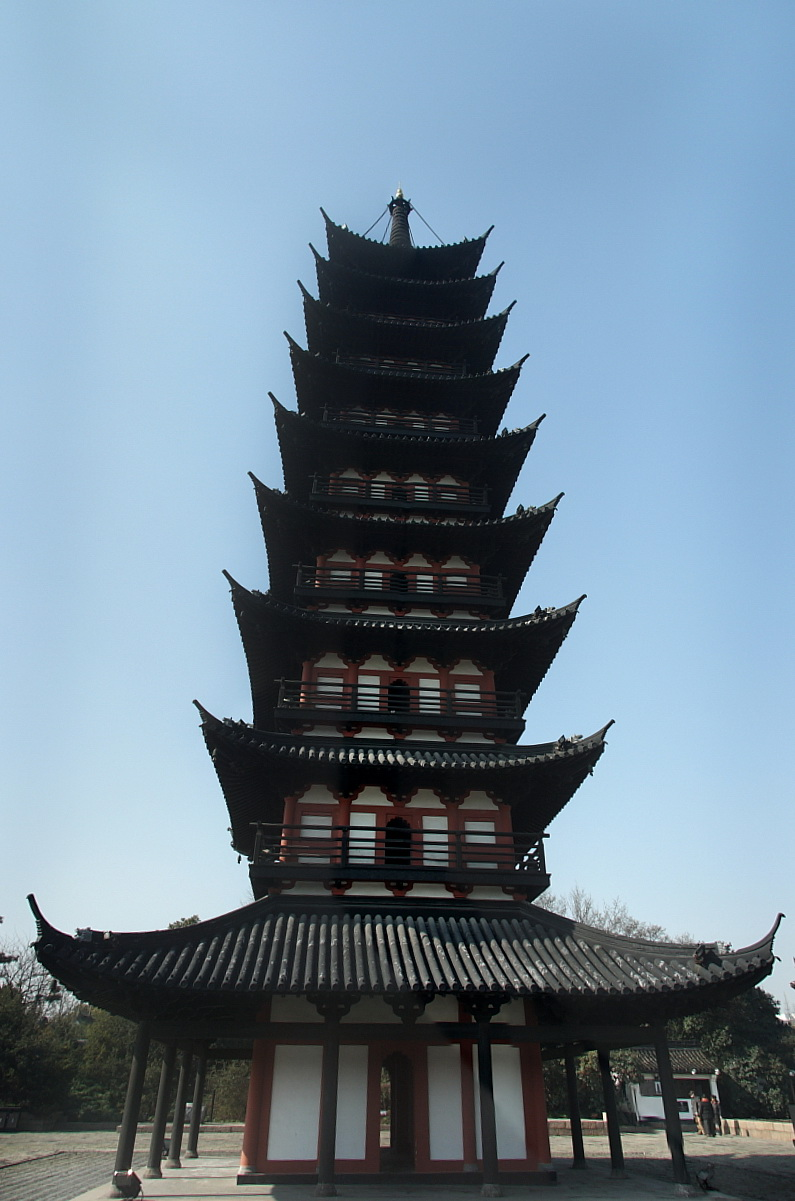
The Square Tower of Songjiang, Shanghai, built in 1884

== Notable pagodas ==
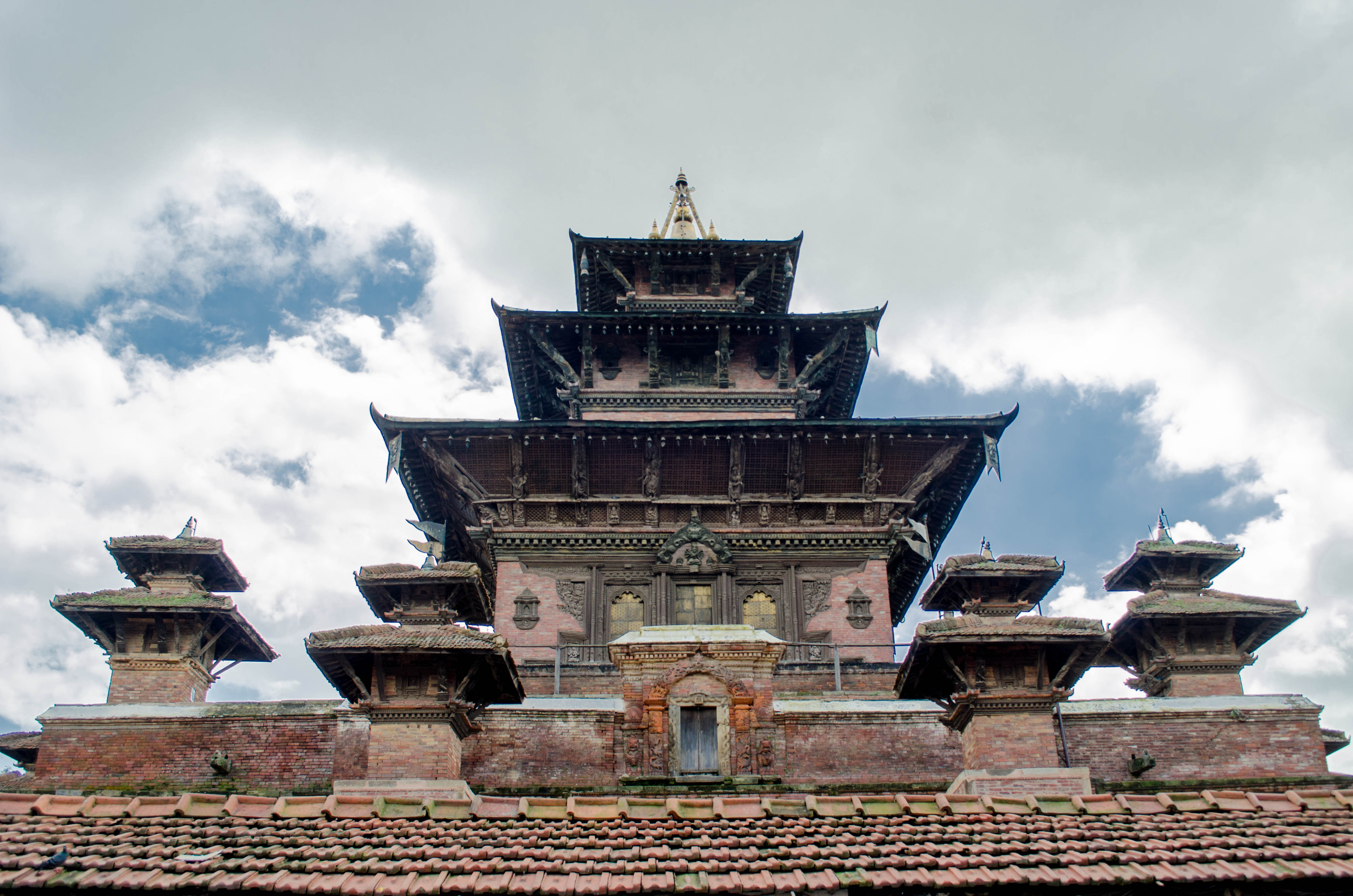
Taleju Temple, a 16th-century temple in Kathmandu Durbar Square

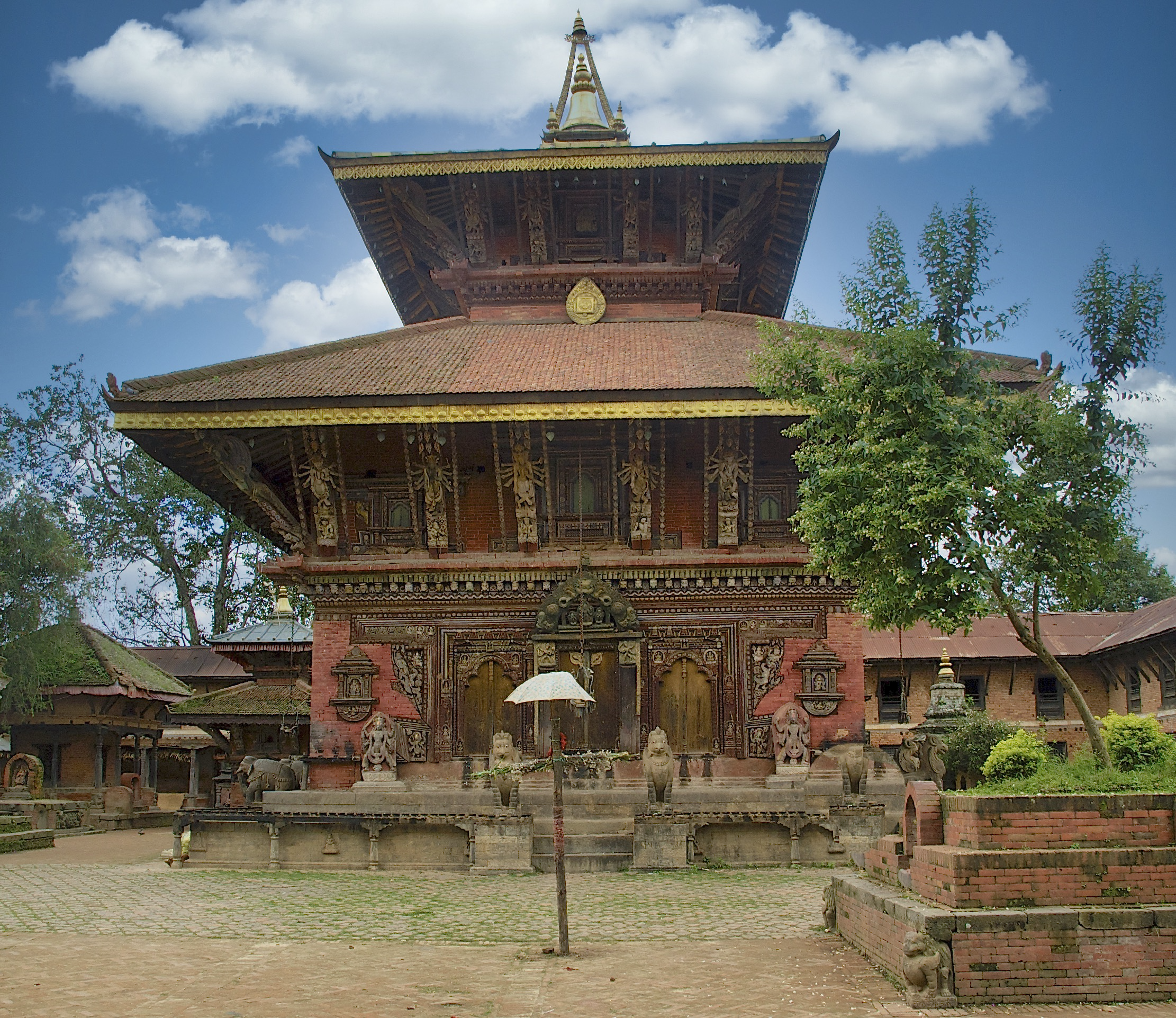
Changu Narayan Temple, Bhaktapur, Nepal

Tiered towers with multiple eaves:

- Dâu Temple, Bắc Ninh, Vietnam, built in 187
- Changu Narayan Temple, Bhaktapur, Nepal, originally built in 4th century CE, rebuilt in 1702
- Pashupatinath Temple, Kathmandu, Nepal, built in the 5th century
- Trấn Quốc Pagoda, Hanoi, Vietnam, built in 545
- Songyue Pagoda on Mount Song, Henan, China, built in 523
- Mireuksa at Iksan, Korea, built in the early 7th century
- Bunhwangsa at Gyeongju, Korea, built in 634
- Xumi Pagoda at Zhengding, Hebei, China, built in 636
- Daqin Pagoda in China, built in 640
- Hwangnyongsa Wooden nine-story pagoda on Hwangnyongsa, Gyeongju, Korea, built in 645
- Seven-story Brick Pagoda at Beopheungsa Temple Site, Andong, Korea, built in the Northern and Southern States period
- Pagoda at Hōryū-ji, Ikaruga, Nara, Japan, built in the 7th century, one of the oldest wooden buildings in the world
- Giant Wild Goose Pagoda, made of brick, built in Xi'an, China in 704
- Small Wild Goose Pagoda, built in Xi'an, China in 709
- Seokgatap on Bulguksa, Gyeongju, South Korea, built in 751, made of granite. In 1966, the Mugujeonggwang Great Dharani Sutra, the oldest extant woodblock print, was found with several other treasures in the second story of this pagoda.
- Dabotap on Bulguksa, Gyeongju, Korea, built in 751
- Tiger Hill Pagoda, built in 961 outside of Suzhou, China
- Lingxiao Pagoda at Zhengding, Hebei, China, built in 1045
- Iron Pagoda of Kaifeng, built in 1049, during the Song dynasty
- Liaodi Pagoda of Dingzhou, built in 1055 during the Song dynasty
- Pagoda of Fogong Temple, built in 1056 in Ying County, Shanxi, China
- Pizhi Pagoda of Lingyan Temple, Shandong, China, 11th century
- Beisi Pagoda at Suzhou, Jiangsu, China, built in 1162
- Liuhe Pagoda (Six Harmonies Pagoda) of Hangzhou, Zhejiang, China, built in 1165 during the Song dynasty
- Ichijō-ji, Kasai, Hyōgo, Japan, built in 1171
- Bình Sơn Pagoda of Vĩnh Khánh Temple, Vĩnh Phúc, Vietnam, built in the Trần dynasty (about the 13th century)
- Phổ Minh pagoda of Phổ Minh Temple, Vietnam, built in 1305
- Prashar Lake temple, dedicated to the Rishi Prashar, the patron of the Mandi region in India. The temple was constructed by Raja Ban Sen in the 14th century, with the rishi being present in the form of a pindi stone.
- The Porcelain Tower of Nanjing, built between 1402 and 1424, a wonder of the medieval world in Nanjing, China.
- Tsui Sing Lau Pagoda in Ping Shan, Hong Kong, built in 1486
- Bajrayogini Temple, Kathmandu, Nepal, built in the 16th century by Pratap Malla
- Taleju Temple, a temple in Kathmandu, Nepal, built in 1564
- Gokarneshwor Mahadev temple, Nepal, built in 1582
- Pazhou Pagoda on Whampoa (Huangpu) Island, Guangzhou (Canton), China, built in 1600
- Phước Duyên Pagoda of Thiên Mụ Temple, in Huế, Vietnam, built in 1844 on the order of the Thiệu Trị Emperor
- Palsangjeon, a five-story pagoda at Beopjusa, Korea built in 1605
- Tō-ji, the tallest wooden structure in Kyoto, Japan, built in 1644
- Nyatapola at Bhaktapur, Kathmandu Valley built during 1701–1702
- The Great Pagoda at Kew Gardens, London, UK, built in 1762
- Reading Pagoda of Reading, Pennsylvania, built in 1908
- Kek Lok Si's main pagoda in Penang, Malaysia, exhibits a combination of Chinese, Burmese and Thai Buddhist architecture, built in 1930
- Seven-storey Pagoda in Chinese Garden at Jurong East, Singapore, built in 1975
- Dragon and Tiger Pagodas in Kaohsiung, Taiwan, built in 1976
- The pagoda of Japan Pavilion at Epcot, Florida, built in 1982
- Pagoda of Tianning Temple, the tallest pagoda in the world since its completion in April 2007, stands at 153.7 m in height.
- Nepalese Peace Pagoda in Brisbane, Australia built for the World Expo '88
- Pagoda Avalokitesvara, Indonesia, tallest pagoda in Indonesia, stands at 45 meters, built in 2004.
- Sun and Moon Pagodas in Guilin, Guangxi, China, twin pagodas on Shan Lake, originally built in the 10th century and reconstructed using historical description on the original foundation in 2001

Stupas called "pagodas":

- Global Vipassana Pagoda, the largest unsupported domed stone structure in the world
- Mingun Pahtodawgyi, a monumental uncompleted stupa began by King Bodawpaya in 1790. If completed, it would be the largest in the world at 150 meters.
- Pha That Luang, the holiest wat, pagoda, and stupa in Laos, in Vientiane
- Phra Pathommachedi the highest pagoda or stupa in Thailand Nakhon Pathom, Thailand
- Shwedagon Pagoda, a 98-metre (322 ft) gilded pagoda and stupa located in Yangon, Myanmar. It is the most sacred Buddhist pagoda for the Burmese with relics of the past four Buddhas enshrined within.
- Shwezigon Pagoda in Nyaung-U, Myanmar. Completed during the reign of King Kyanzittha in 1102, it is a prototype of Burmese stupas.
- Uppatasanti Pagoda, a 325-foot tall landmark in Naypyidaw, Myanmar, built from 2006 to 2009, which houses a Buddha tooth relic

Places called "pagoda" but which are not tiered structures with multiple eaves:

- One Pillar Pagoda: Hanoi, Vietnam, is an icon of Vietnamese culture. It was built in 1049, destroyed, and rebuilt in 1954.

Structures that evoke pagoda architecture:

- The Dragon House of Sanssouci Park, an eighteenth-century German attempt at imitating Chinese architecture
- The Panasonic Pagoda, or Pagoda Tower, at the Indianapolis Motor Speedway. This 13-story pagoda, used as the control tower for races such as the Indy 500, has been transformed several times since it was first built in 1913.
- Jin Mao Tower in Shanghai, built between 1994 and 1999
- Petronas Towers in Kuala Lumpur, the tallest buildings in the world from 1998 to 2004
- Taipei 101 in Taiwan, record setter for height (508 m) in 2004 and currently (2021) the world's tenth tallest completed building

Structures not generally thought of as pagodas, but which have some pagoda-like characteristics:

- The Hall of Prayer for Good Harvests at the Temple of Heaven
- Wongudan Altar in Korea
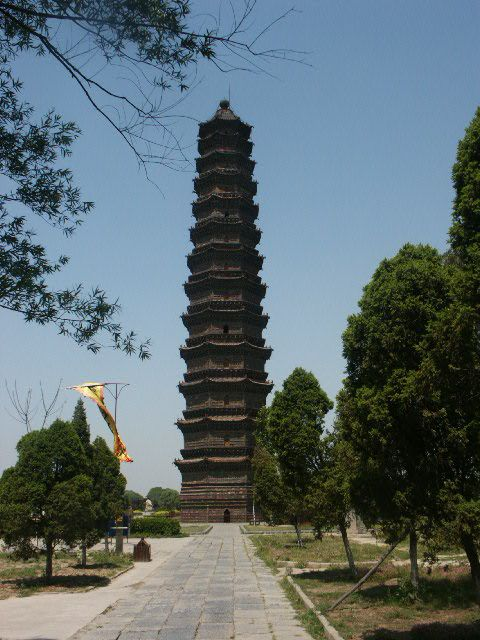
The Iron Pagoda of Kaifeng, China, built in 1049

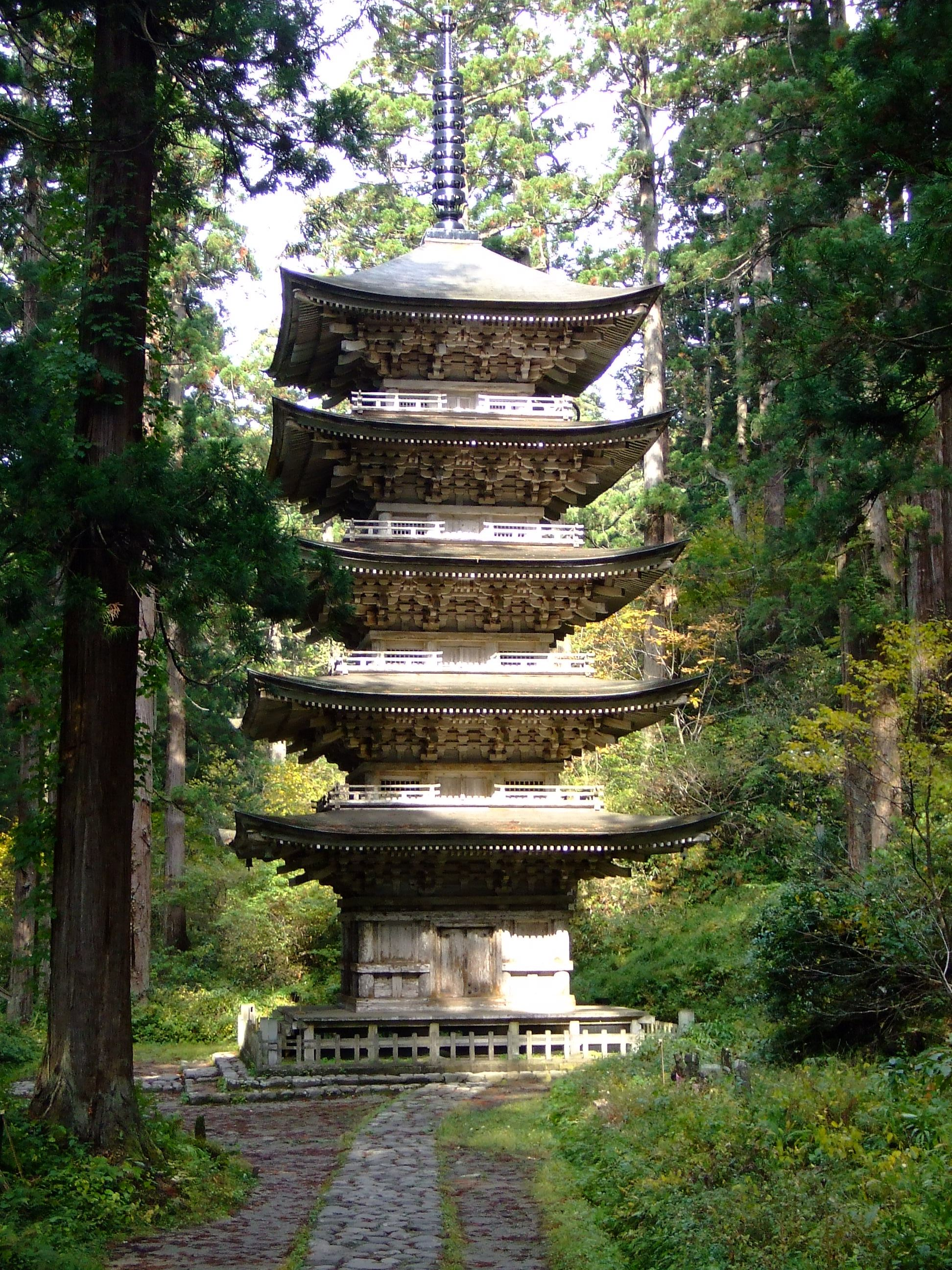
Five-story pagoda of Mount Haguro, Japan

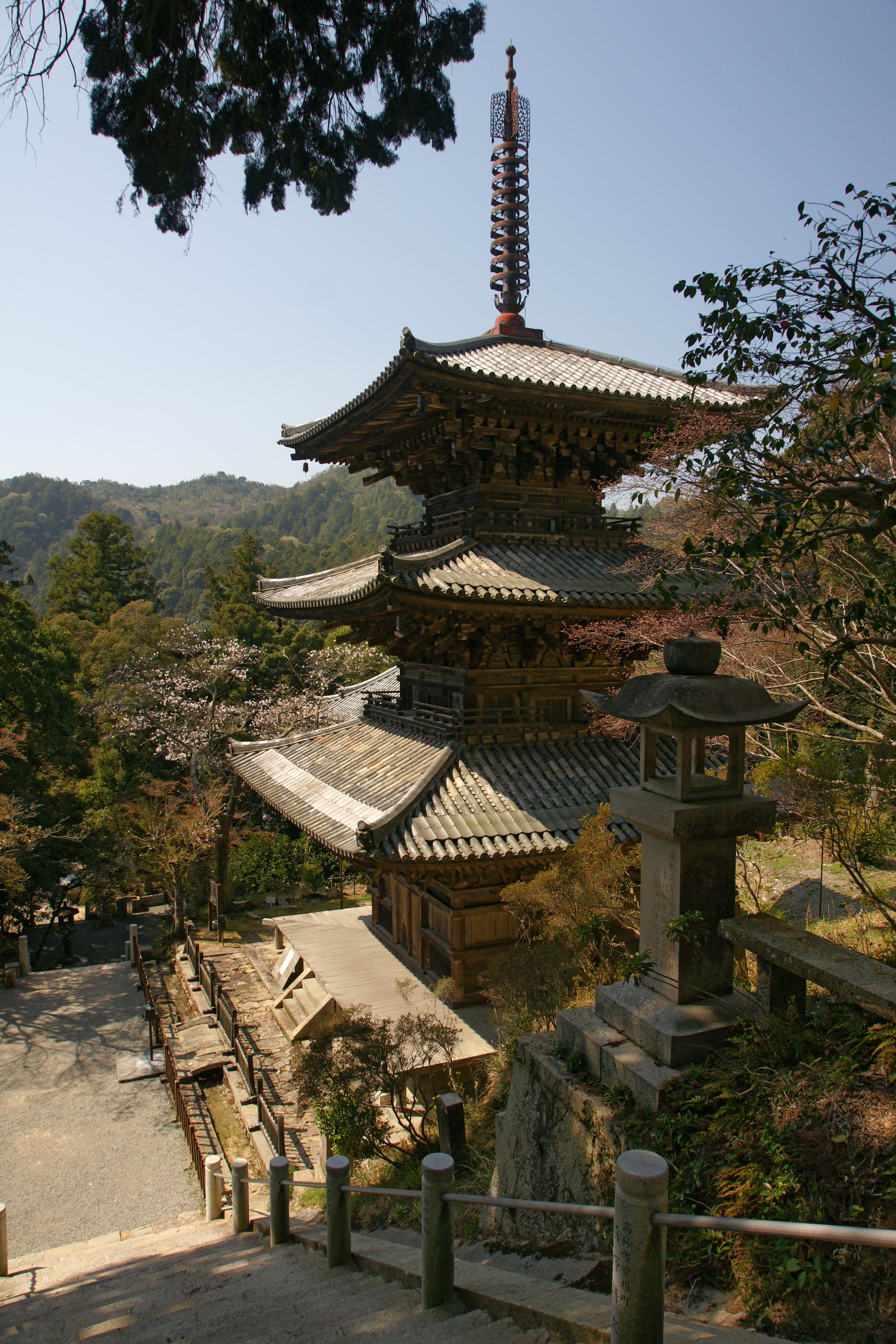
Wooden three-story pagoda of Ichijō-ji in Japan, built in 1171

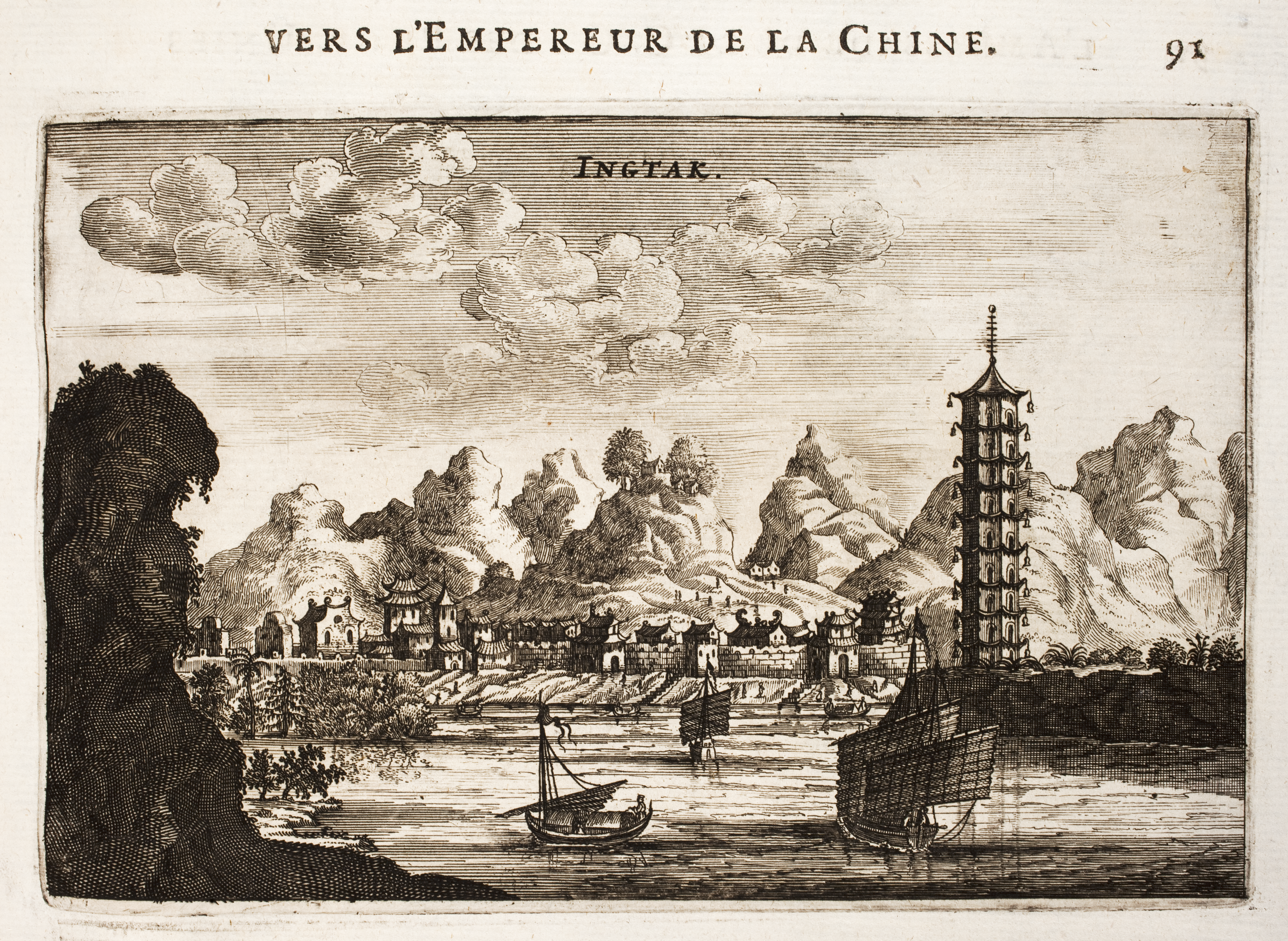
Yingde pagoda, Qingyuan, Guangdong Province, China, from Johan Nieuhof (1618–1672); Jean-Baptiste Le Carpentier (1606 – c. 1670): L'ambassade de la Compagnie Orientale des Provinces Unies vers l'Empereur de la Chine, 1665

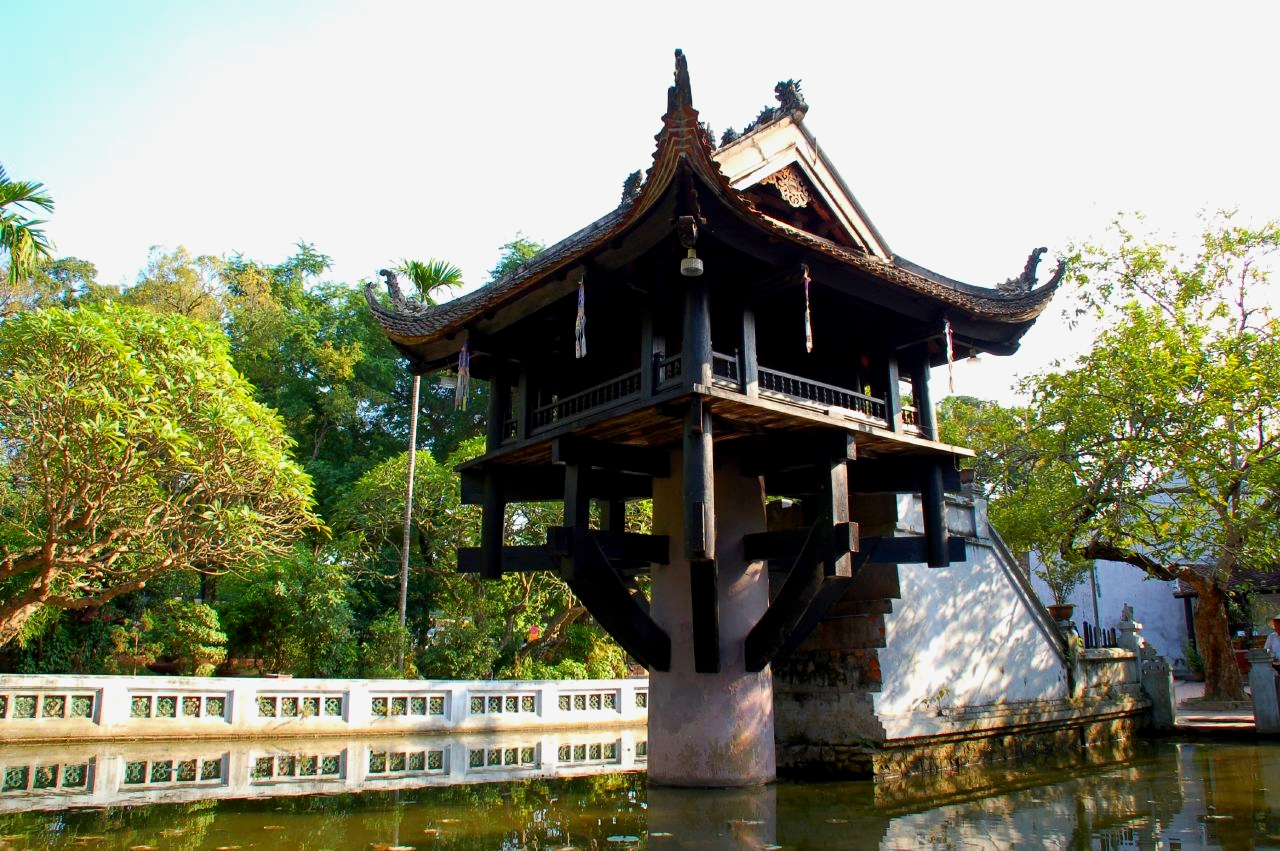
One Pillar Pagoda, Hanoi, Vietnam

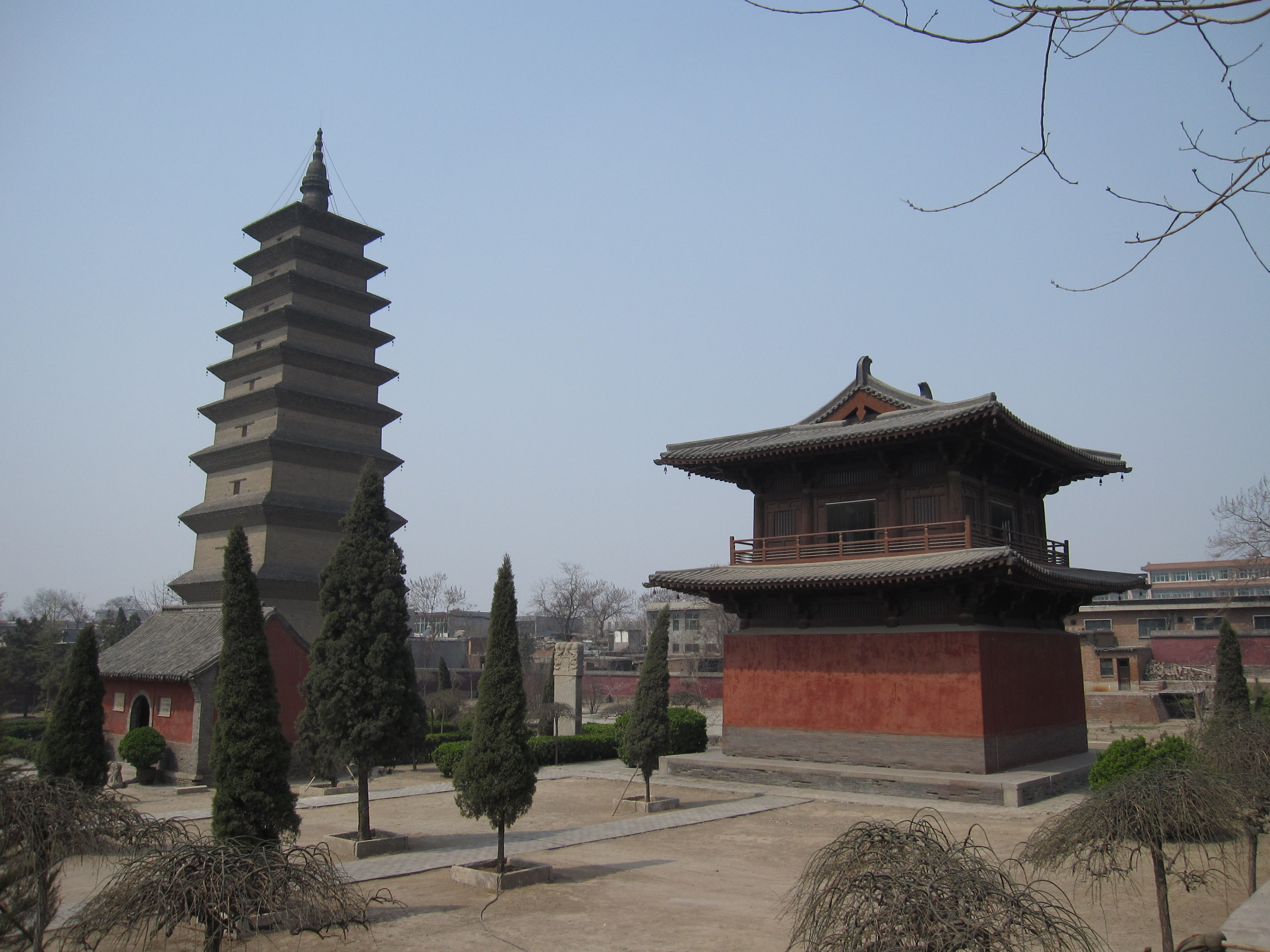
The nine-story Xumi Pagoda, Hebei, China, built in 636

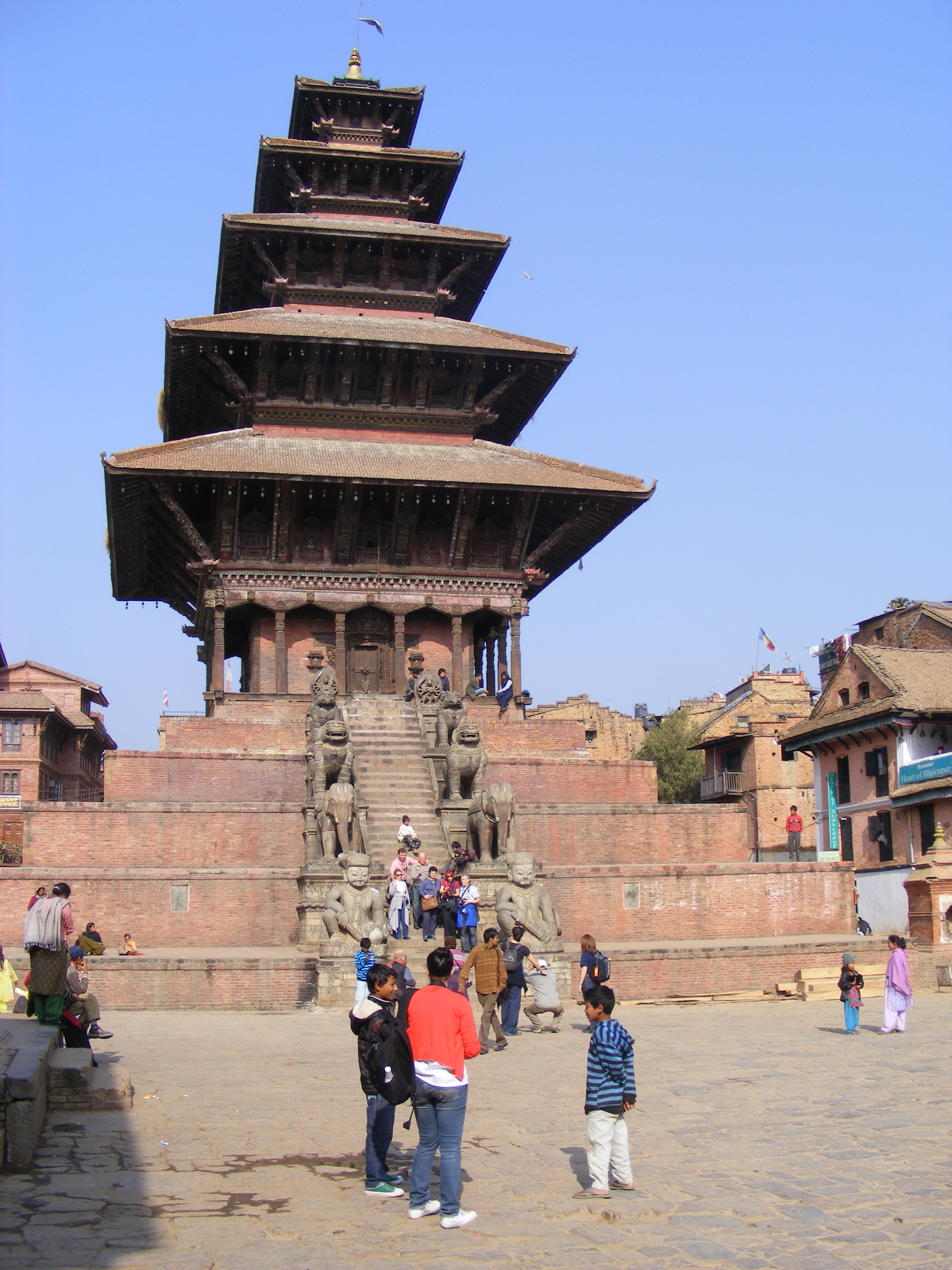
Nyatapola Temple located in Bhaktapur, Nepal, built in 1701–1702

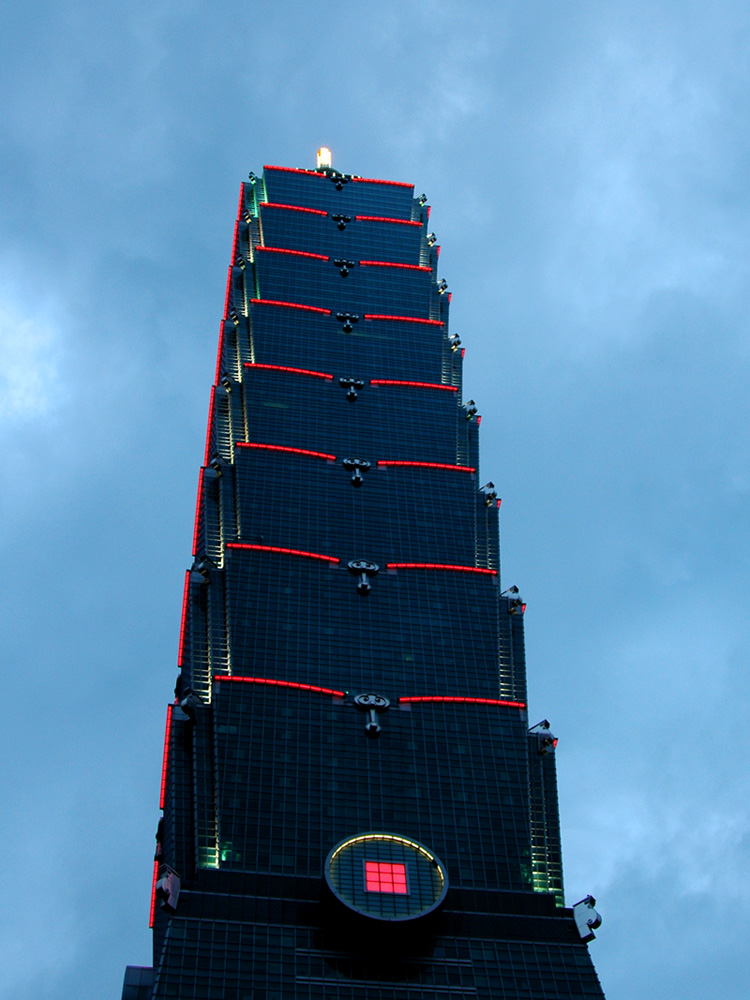
Taipei 101 in Taipei, Taiwan

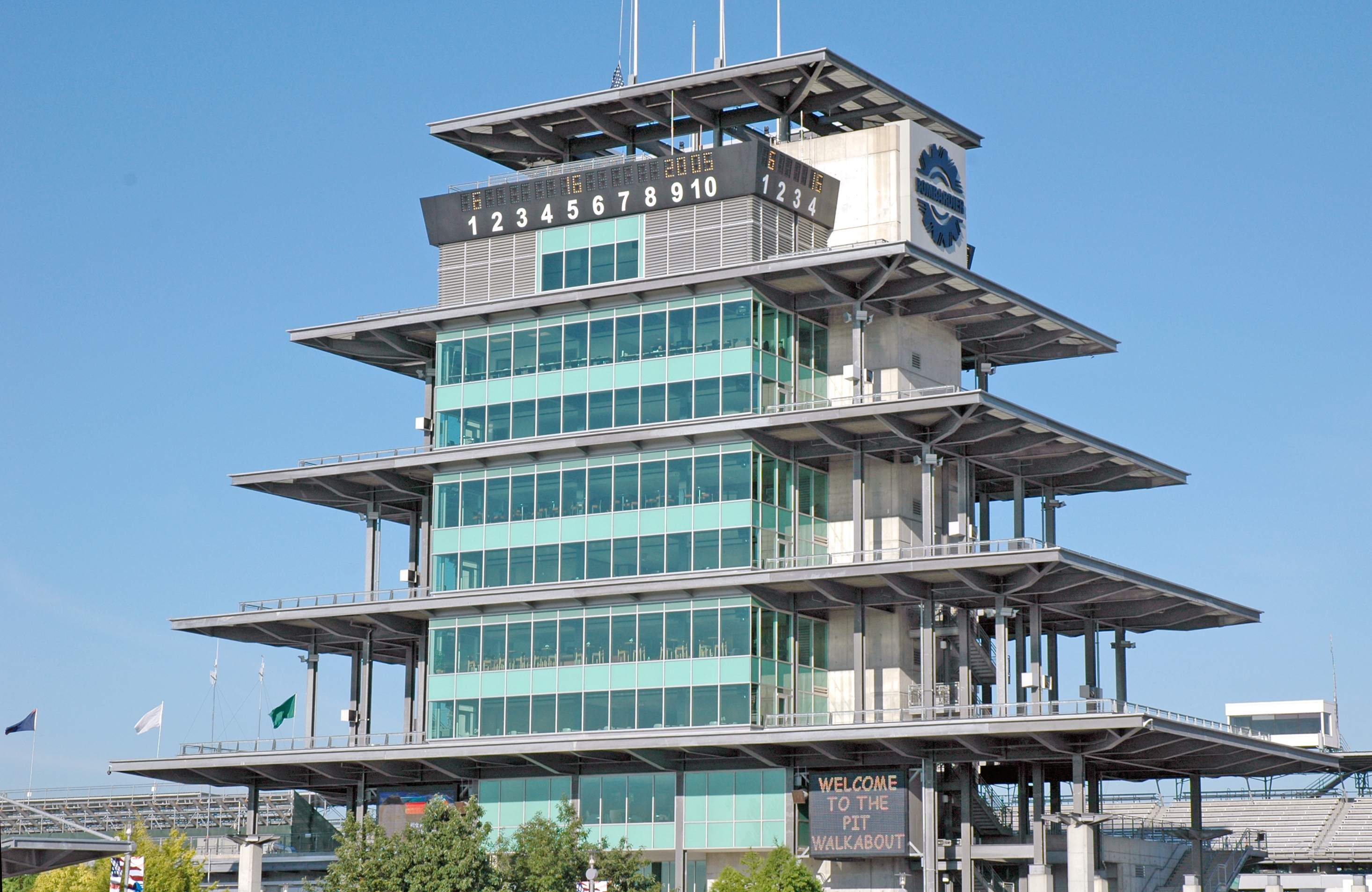
The Bombardier Pagoda at the Indianapolis Motor Speedway

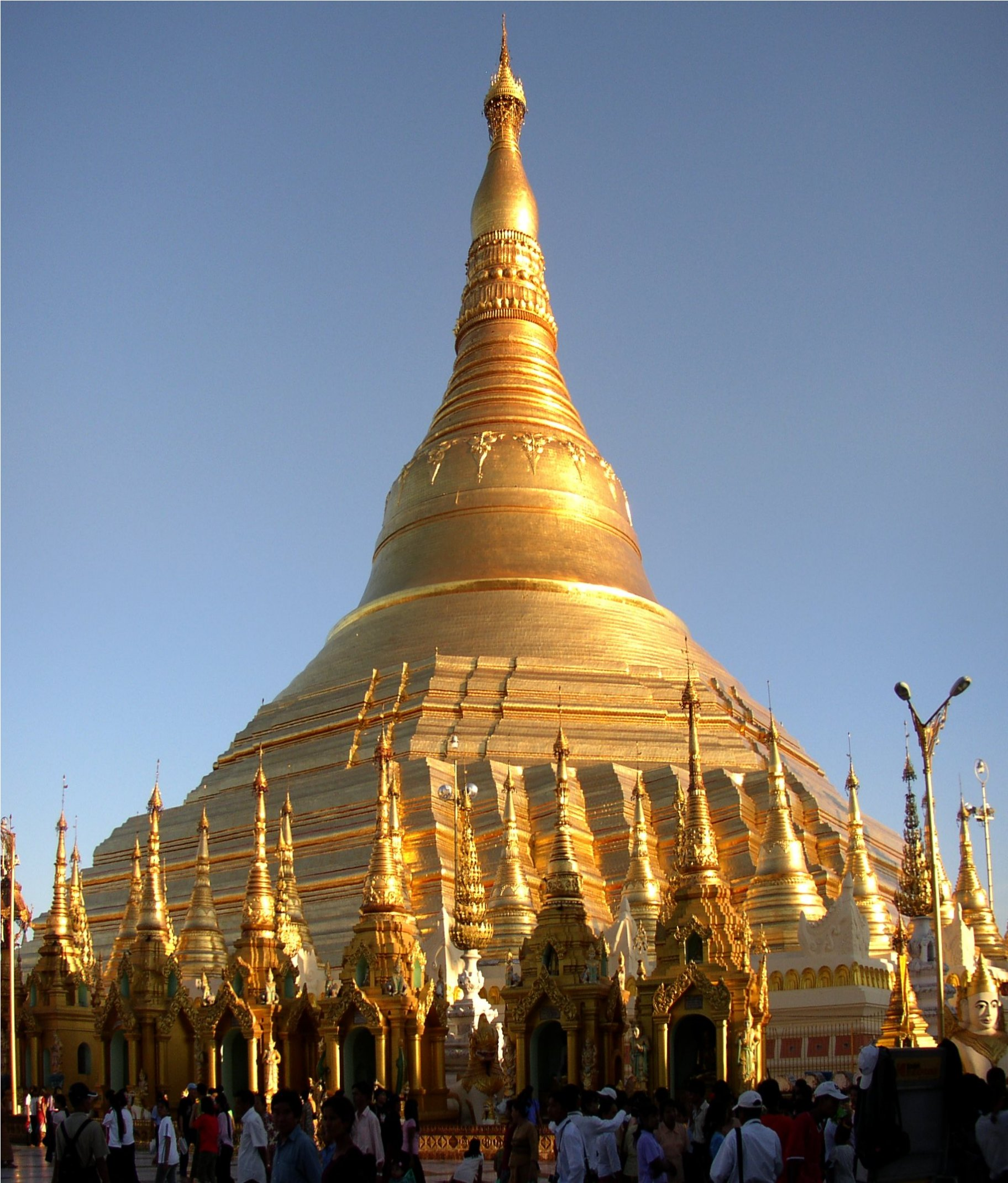
Shwedagon Pagoda located in Yangon, Myanmar. The whole structure is coated with 60 tons of pure gold

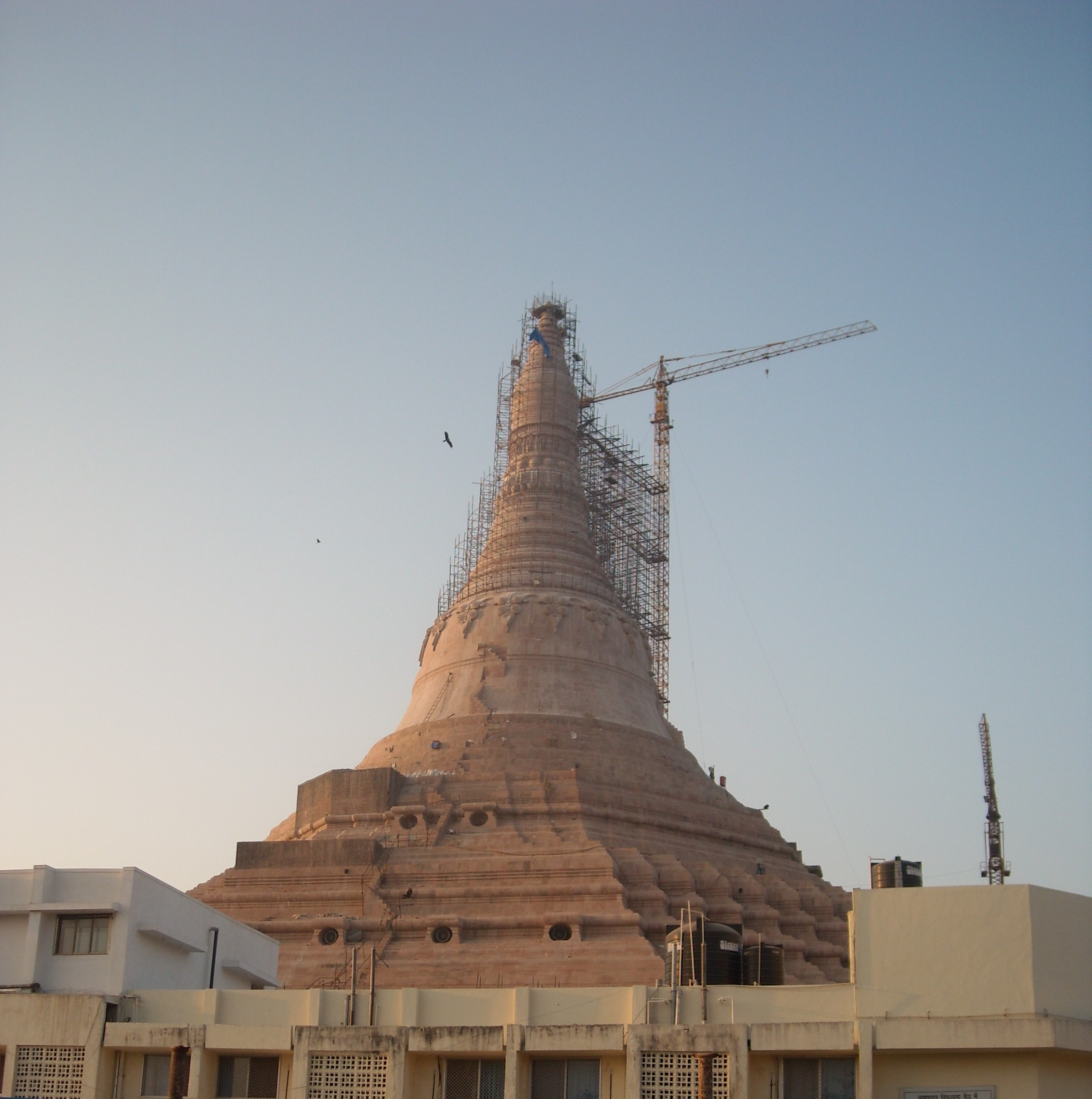
Pagoda Mumbai

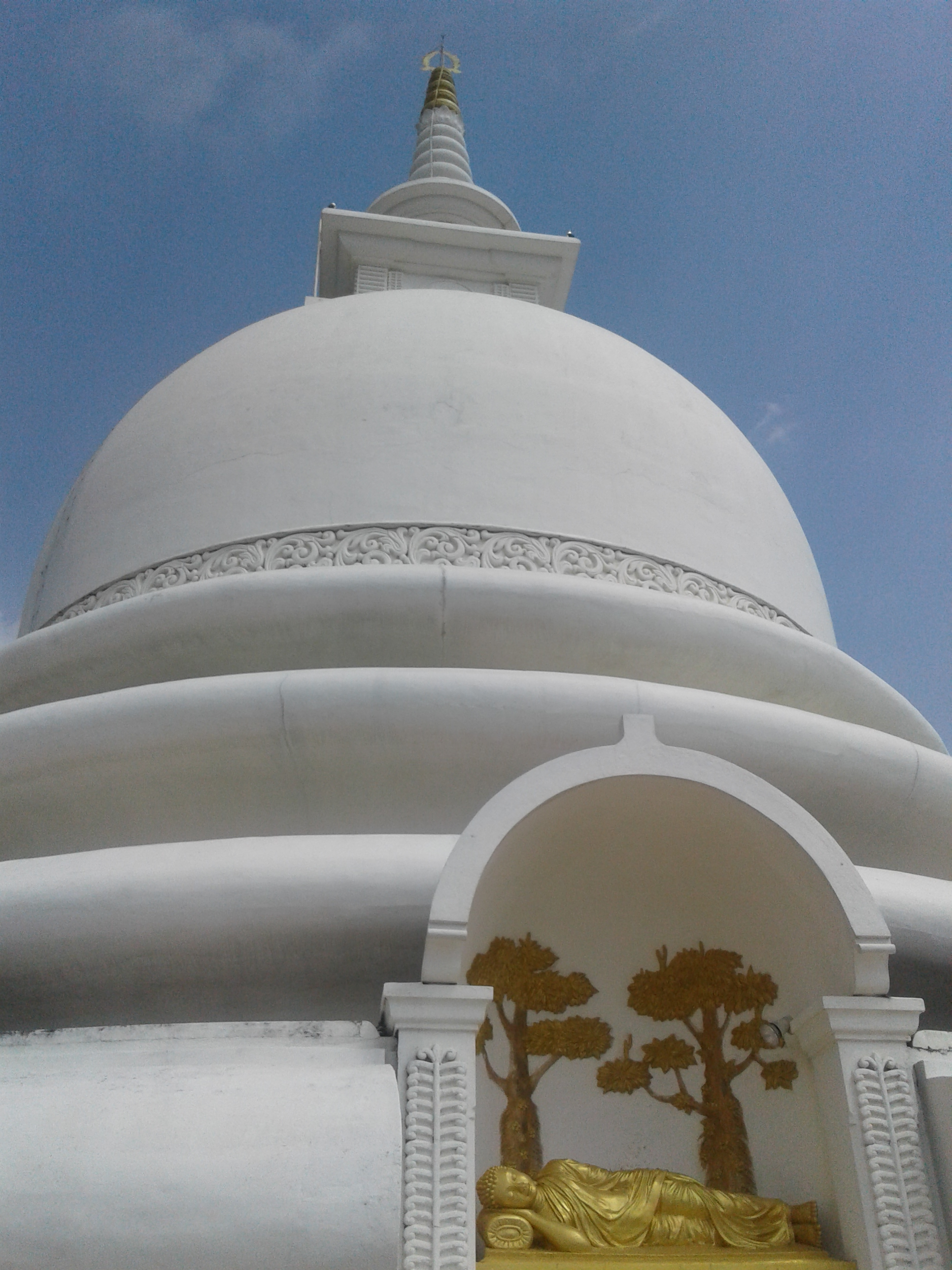
Peace Pagoda - Sri Lanka

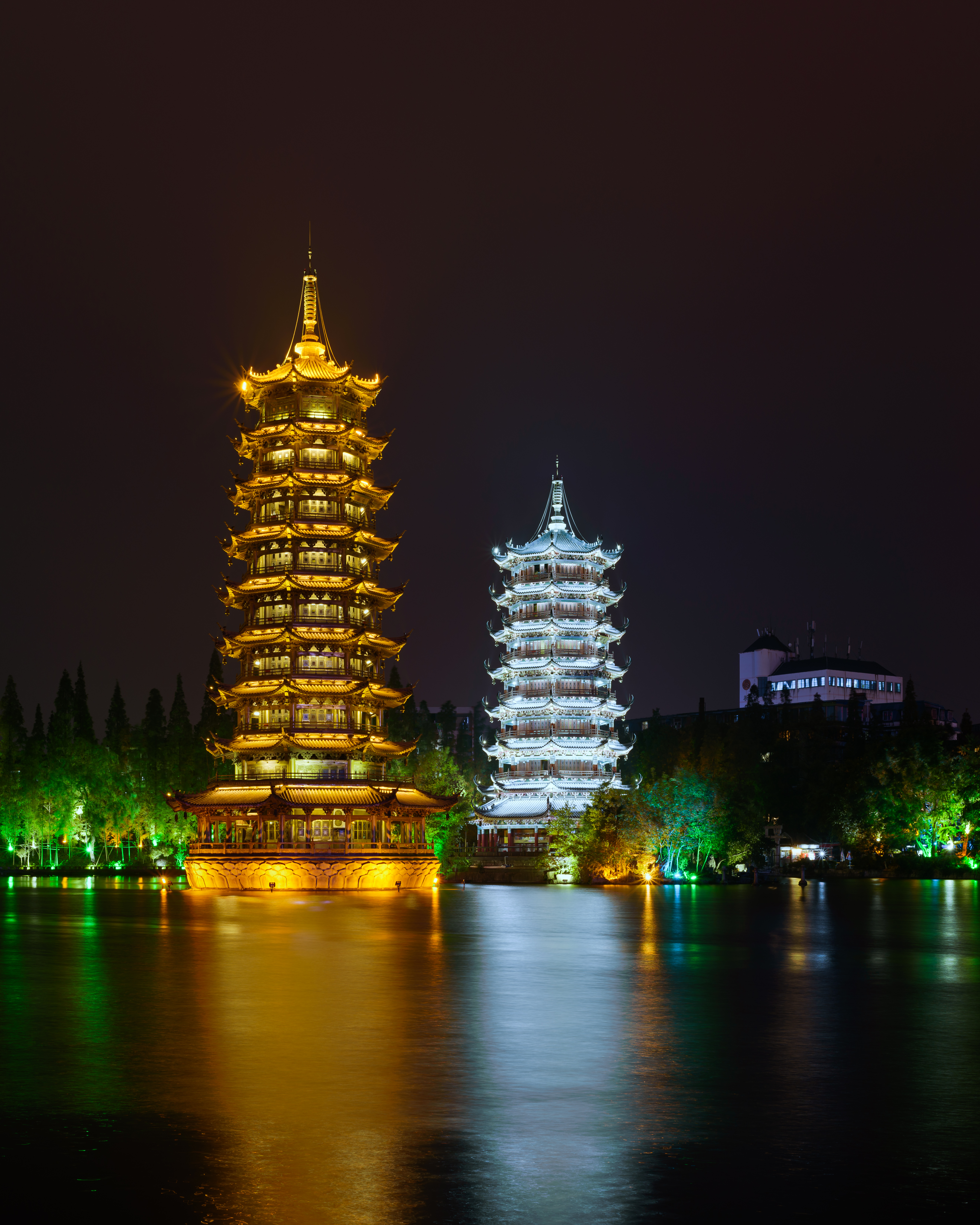
The Sun and Moon Pagodas lighted at night and reflected in Lake Shanhu in November 2017.

== See also ==
- Architecture of the Song dynasty
- Cetiya
- Chaitya
- Pyatthat
- Gopuram
- Kath-Kuni architecture
- Chinese architecture
- Gongbei – Chinese Muslim mausoleum with pagoda-style architecture
- Japanese pagoda
- Korean pagoda
- List of pagodas in Beijing
- Chaoyang North Tower
- Guanghui Temple Huatai Pagoda
- Samgwangsa#The largest stone pagoda in East Asia
