= Hengzhou =

Hengzhou, formerly also romanized as Hengchow or Heng-chou, may refer to:

- Heng Prefecture (橫州), a former imperial prefecture around Hengzhou, Guangxi, China
  - Hengzhou, Guangxi (横州), a city in Nanning Prefecture, Guangxi, China
- Heng Prefecture (衡州), a former imperial prefecture around Hengyang, Hunan, China
  - Hengzhou (衡州), a former name of Hengyang, Hunan, China
  - Hengzhou (衡州), an alternative name for the Roman Catholic Diocese of Hengyang
- Heng Prefecture (恆州), a former imperial prefecture established under the Northern Wei in Datong, Shanxi, China
- Heng Prefecture (Hebei) (恆州), a former imperial prefecture first established under the Northern Zhou in Zhengding County, Shijiazhuang, Hebei, later moved under the Yuan to Quyang County, Baoding, Hebei, China
  - Hengzhou (恆州), a former name of Zhengding, Hunan, China
  - Hengzhou (恆州), a town in Quyang County, Hebei, China

== See also ==
- Heng (disambiguation)
