= ZDC =

ZDC may refer to:

- Washington Air Route Traffic Control Center, an Area Control Center in Leesburg, Virginia, United States
- ZDC, the Pinyin code for Zhengding Airport railway station, Shijiazhuang, Hebei Province, China
