= Xipingle Township =

Coordinates: 38°15′49″N 114°38′24″E

Xipingle Township 西平乐乡
- Township

Chinese transcription(s)
- Interactive map of Xipingle Township
- Country: China
- Province: Hebei
- Prefecture: Shijiazhuang
- County: Zhengding County
- Time zone: UTC+8 (China Standard Time)

Xipingle Township (Chinese: 西平乐乡) is a township-level division of Zhengding County, Shijiazhuang, Hebei, China.

== See also ==
- List of township-level divisions of Hebei
