= Xinchengpu =

Coordinates: 38°16′N 114°41′E

Xinchengpu 新城铺镇
- Town

Chinese transcription(s)
- Interactive map of Xinchengpu
- Country: China
- Province: Hebei
- Prefecture: Shijiazhuang
- County: Zhengding County
- Time zone: UTC+8 (China Standard Time)

Xinchengpu town (Chinese: 新城铺镇) is a township-level division of Zhengding County, Shijiazhuang, Hebei, China.

Shijiazhuang Zhengding International Airport and Zhengding Airport Railway Station are located in this town next to the town-center.

== See also ==
- List of township-level divisions of Hebei
