= Lingxiao Pagoda =

Pagoda in Hebei, China

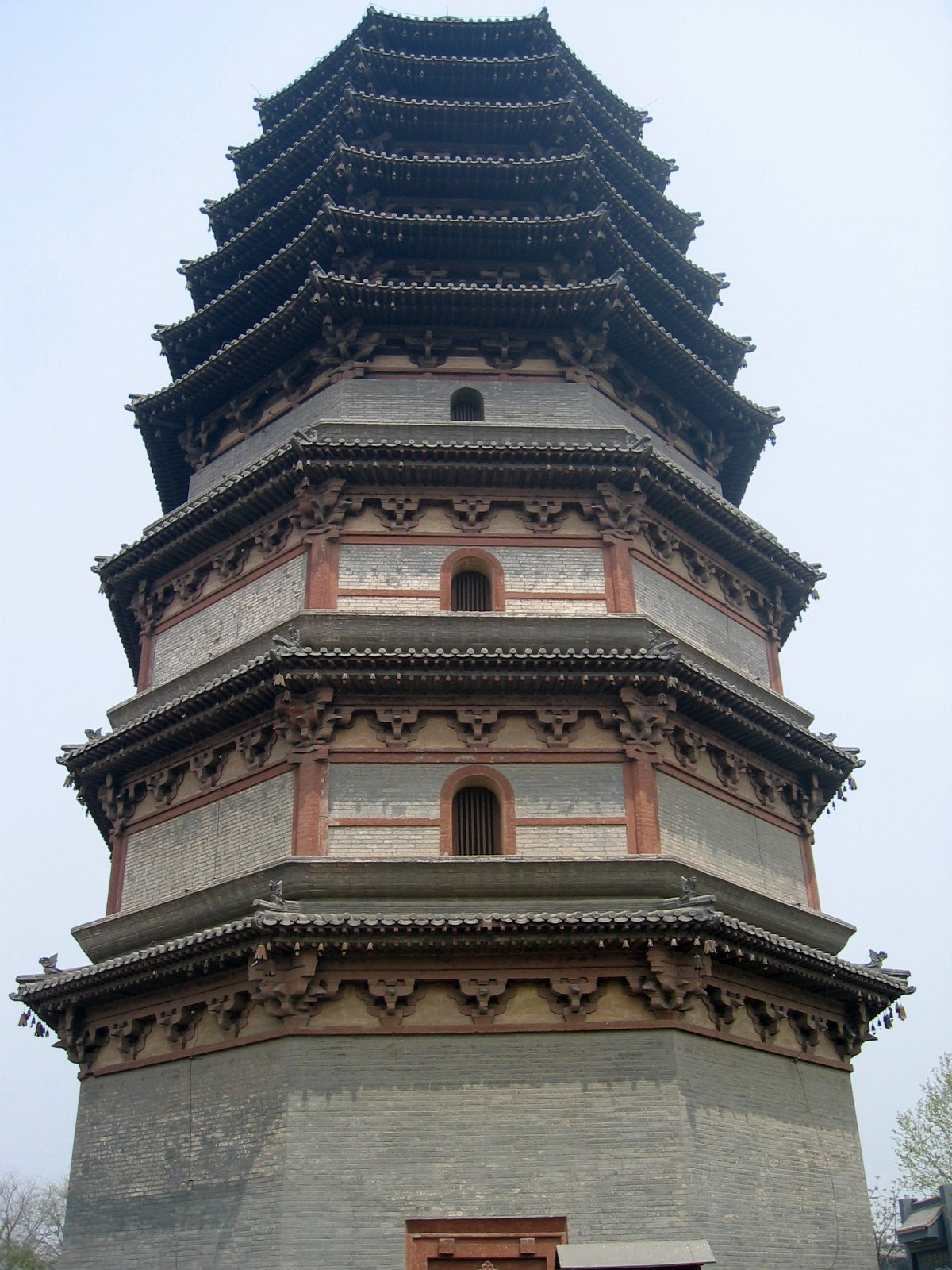
The Lingxiao Pagoda of Zhengding, Hebei Province, a half-brick half-wooden pagoda built in 1045 AD, with little change in renovations since.

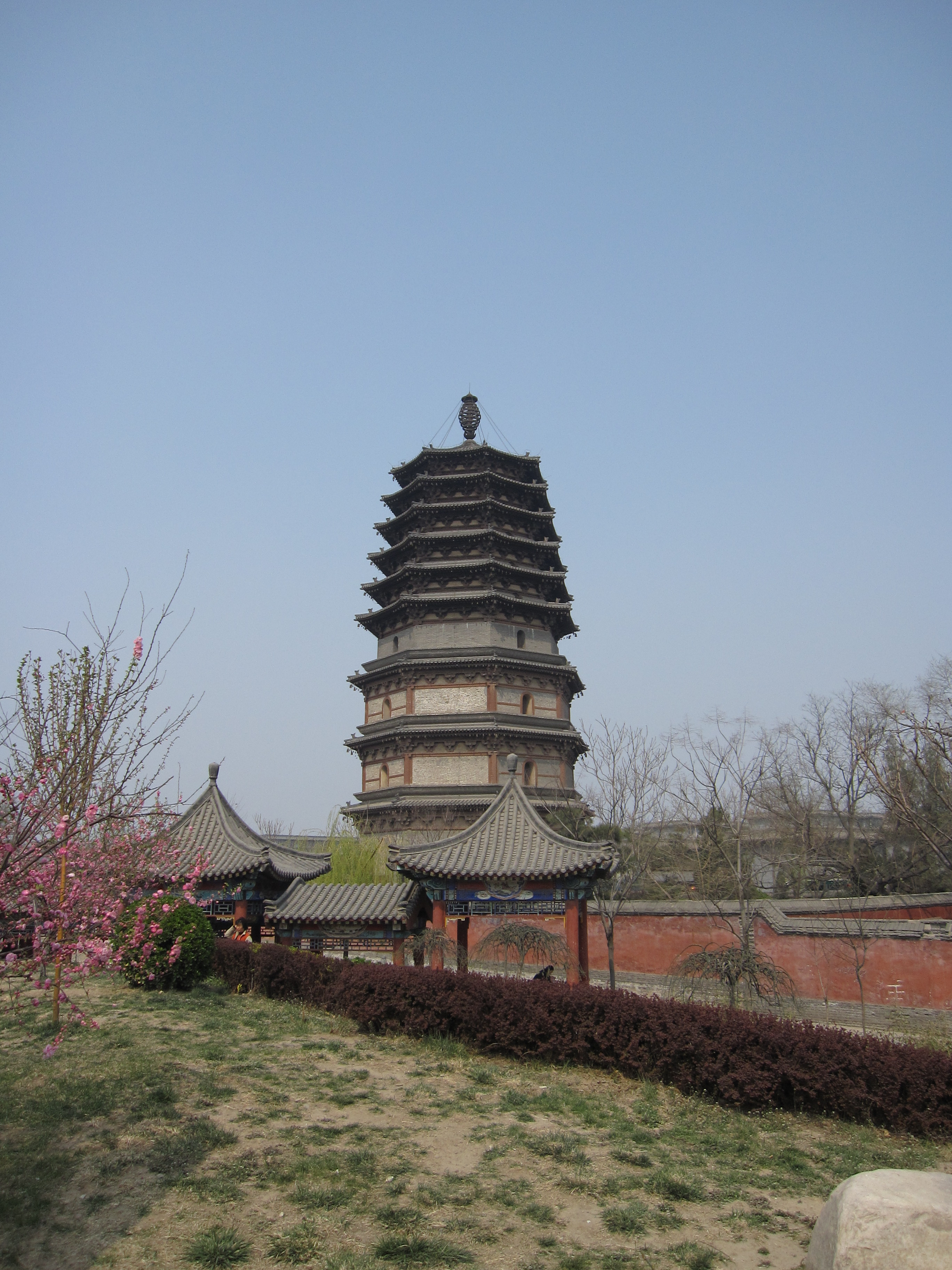

The Lingxiao Pagoda (Chinese: 凌霄塔; pinyin: Língxiāo tǎ; Wade–Giles: Linghsiao T'a) is a Chinese pagoda west of the Xinglong Temple in Zhengding, Hebei Province, China.

== History ==
The original pagoda that stood at the same site was dubbed the Wooden Pagoda, and was built in 860 AD during the Tang dynasty (618-907). The pagoda's present form of brick and wood dates to 1045 AD during the reign of Emperor Renzong (1022–1063) of the Song dynasty (960-1279), and was renovated and restored in the Yuan, Ming, and Qing dynasties. It was formerly part of the Tianning Monastery, and although the latter no longer exists, the pagoda has been well preserved since the 11th century. In 1966 the pagoda was damaged in an earthquake, but immediate repairs have kept it standing and open to the public.

== Features ==
The brick base and structure of the 42 m (137 ft) tall pagoda ends after the 4th floor, as the rest of its height from the 5th floor up is purely wooden construction. It features a total of nine stories with nine wooden tiers of eaves encircling the octagonal frame of the pagoda. In the center of the pagoda stands a large column, a feature of Chinese architecture in pagodas that was discontinued sometime after the Song and Yuan periods. Built a decade later in 1055, the Liaodi Pagoda (China's tallest pre-modern pagoda) also features an inner column, in the shape of another pagoda. Within the interior of the Lingxiao Pagoda, a wooden staircase leads up to the 4th floor. The pagoda is also crowned with a cast iron spire. It is at the foot of this pagoda, that Dutch bishop Mgr. Frans Schraven (1873-1937) and his companions suffered their martyrdom in 1937, at the hands of the Japanese army, because of their refusal to hand over to the soldiers the Chinese women and girls whom had taken refuge in his compound.

== See also ==
- Architecture of the Song dynasty
- List of Buddhist temples
