= Quyangqiao Township =

Coordinates: 38.23729°N 114.48041°E

Quyang Township 曲阳桥乡
- Township

Chinese transcription(s)
- Interactive map of Quyang Township
- Country: China
- Province: Hebei
- Prefecture: Shijiazhuang
- County: Zhengding County
- Time zone: UTC+8 (China Standard Time)

Quyang Township (Chinese: 曲阳桥乡) is a township-level division of Zhengding County, Shijiazhuang, Hebei, China.

== See also ==
- List of township-level divisions of Hebei
