= Nanniu Township =

Nanniu Township 南牛乡
- Township
- Location in Hebei
- Coordinates: 38°11′50″N 114°38′35″E
- Country: People's Republic of China
- Province: Hebei
- Prefecture-level city: Shijiazhuang
- County: Zhengding
- Time zone: UTC+8 (China Standard Time)

Nanniu Township (Chinese: 南牛乡) is a township-level division of Zhengding County, Shijiazhuang, Hebei, China.

== See also ==
- List of township-level divisions of Hebei
