= Xumi Pagoda =

Pagoda near Zhengding, China

Coordinates: 38°08′22″N 114°33′54″E

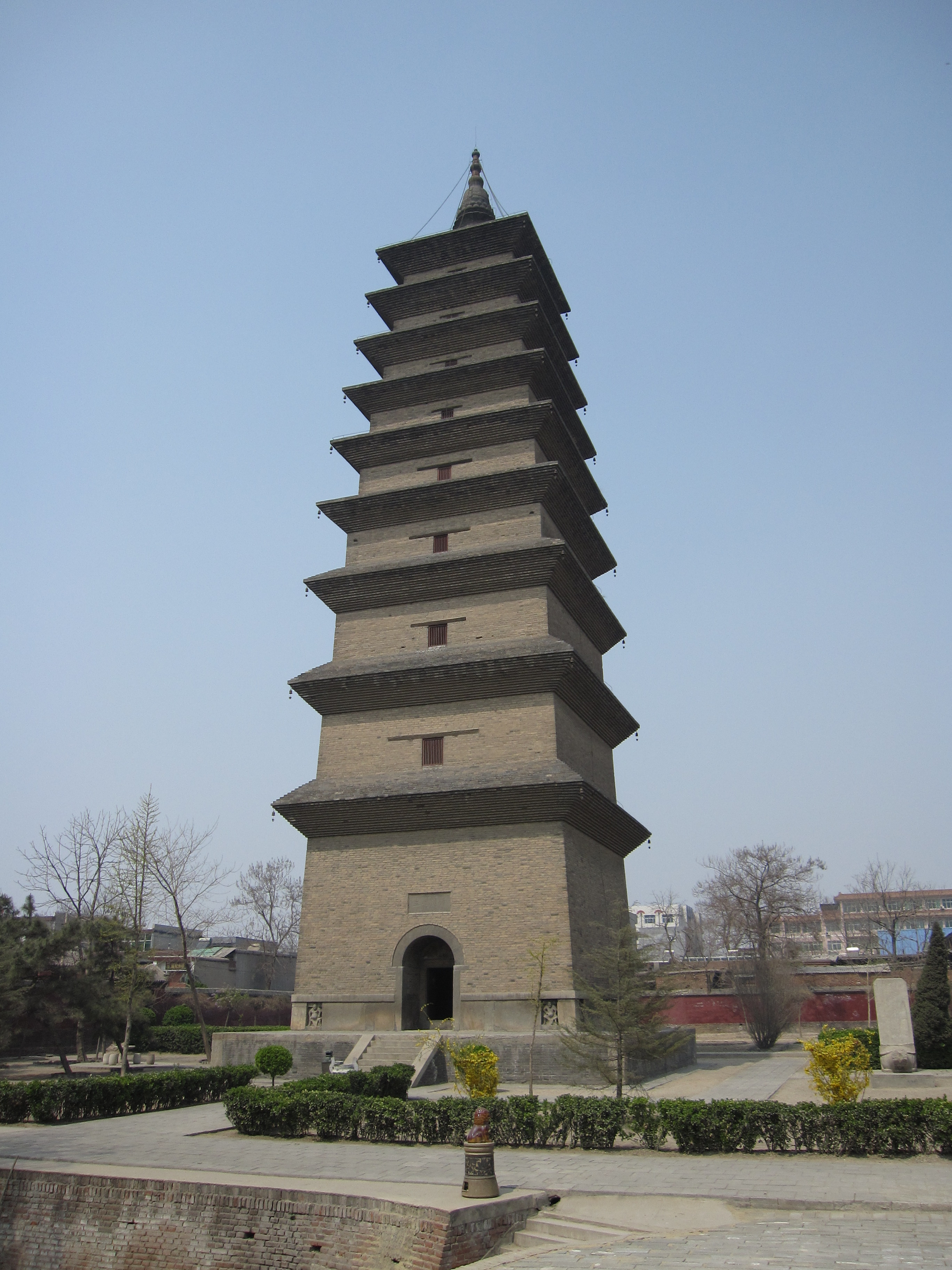
The Xumi Pagoda

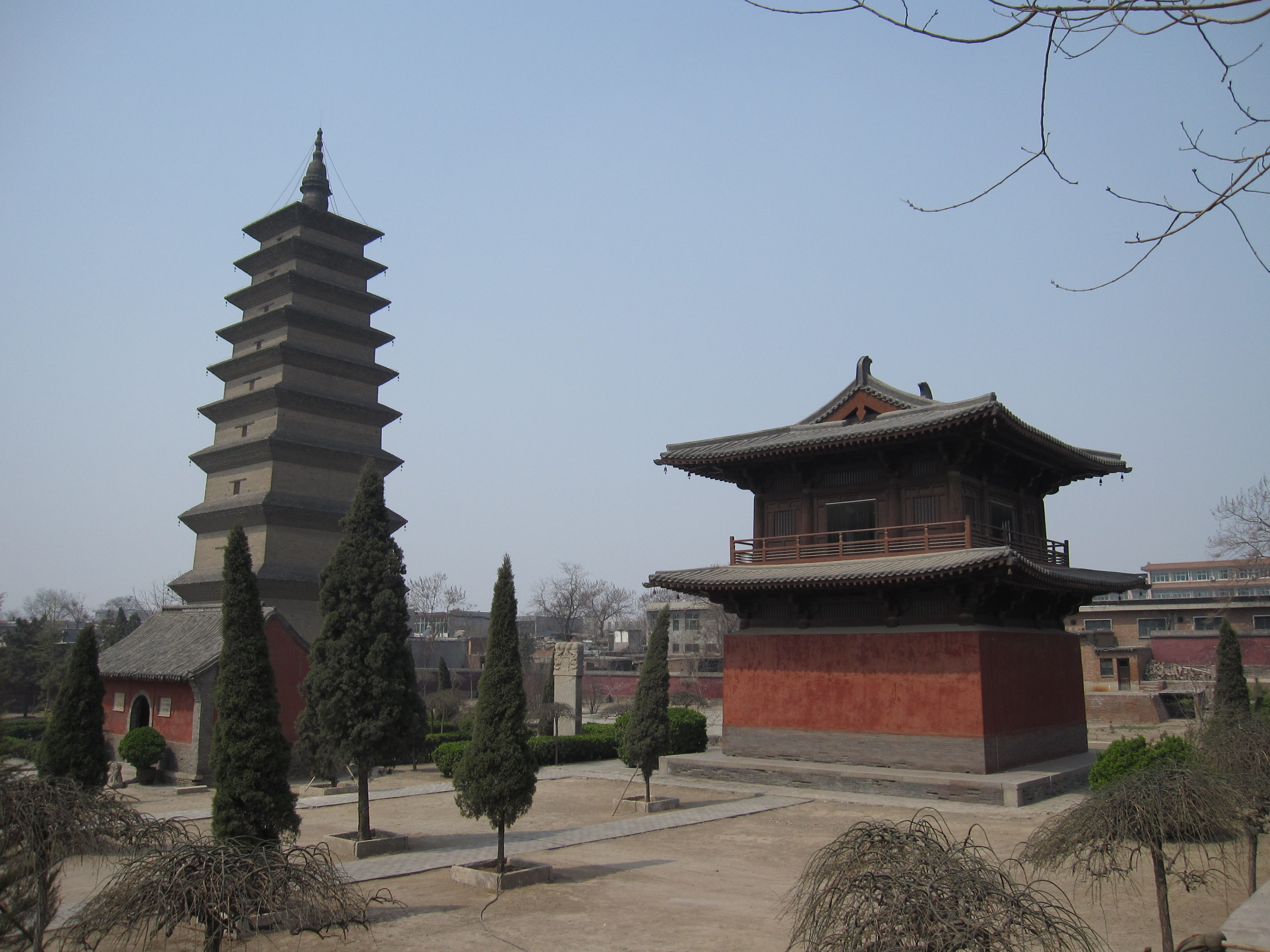
The Xumi Pagoda at the grounds of the Kaiyuan Temple

The Xumi Pagoda (simplified Chinese: 须弥塔; traditional Chinese: 須彌塔; pinyin: Xūmí tǎ; Wade–Giles: Hsümi T'a) or Sumeru Pagoda, also known as Summer Pagoda, is a Chinese pagoda of the Buddhist Kaiyuan Monastery west of Zhengding, Hebei province, China. This square-base stone and brick pagoda was built in the year 636 AD during the reign of Emperor Taizong of the Tang dynasty (618–907). It stands at a height of 48 m (157 ft) and has been well preserved since its initial construction. The monastery that once surrounded the pagoda, however, has largely been destroyed, with the exception of a few structures.

The pagoda has nine tiers of eaves and a crowning spire, along with artwork of stone carvings at the corners of the stone platform that makes up its base. The interior of the pagoda is hollow and lacks a staircase to reach the higher floors. Its style of eaves in gradual tiers resembles that of other Tang pagodas, such as the Small Wild Goose and Giant Wild Goose pagodas. Near the arched doorway leading into the pagoda is a colossal stone body of a bixi, a Chinese mythical beast in the shape of a tortoise-like dragon. The left side of the statue had been broken off and missing, until it was found in 2000, during an excavation at a nearby street.

== See also ==
- Chinese architecture
- List of Buddhist temples
