= Zhengding Town =

Zhengding 正定镇 眞定 Chengting
- Town
- Interactive map of Zhengding
- Coordinates: 38°08′47″N 114°34′15″E
- Country: People's Republic of China
- Province: Hebei
- Prefecture-level city: Shijiazhuang
- County: Zhengding
- Elevation: 74 m (243 ft)
- Time zone: UTC+8 (China Standard Time)
- Postal code: 050800
- Area code: 0311

Zhengding
- Chinese: 正定
- Postal: Chengting
Transcriptions
Standard Mandarin
- Hanyu Pinyin: Zhèngdìng
- Wade–Giles: Cheng^{4}-ting^{4}

Zhengding (正定), originally Zhending (Chinese: 眞定(縣城)) and alternately romanized as Chengting is a town in and being the seat of Zhengding County, in southwestern Hebei province, China, located just to the north of Shijiazhuang, the provincial capital, in between China National Highway 107 and G4 Beijing–Hong Kong and Macau Expressway. As of 2011, it has 13 residential communities (社区) and 49 villages under its administration.

== See also ==
- List of township-level divisions of Hebei
