= Heng Prefecture (Hebei) =

Prefecture of imperial China

- Traditional Chinese: 恆州
- Simplified Chinese: 恒州
- Literal meaning: Hengshan Prefecture
Transcriptions
Standard Mandarin
- Hanyu Pinyin: Héngzhōu
- Wade–Giles: Hêng-chou

Heng Prefecture, also known by its Chinese name as Heng Zhou or Hengzhou, was a prefecture of imperial China in what is now western Hebei.

== Geography ==
Under the Tang, Heng Prefecture included land in Shijiazhuang and Fuping County, Baoding. Its seat was originally at Zhending (now Zhengding) in Shijiazhuang, but was removed to Hengzhou in Quyang County, Baoding, under the Yuan.

== History ==
Heng Prefecture borrowed its name from an earlier prefecture around Datong in Shanxi that was established under the Northern Wei in 493. In 578, the Northern Zhou created this second Heng Prefecture as part of a reorganization of Ding Prefecture. In 607, the Sui reorganized it as Hengshan Commandery. The Tang then reëstablished it around 618, reorganized it as Changshan Commandery between 742 and 758, and then finally renamed it Zhen Prefecture in 820 to avoid naming taboo upon the ascension of the new emperor Li Heng (posthumously remembered as Emperor Muzong). Under the late Tang, it was part of the territory of the Chengde jiedushis and, during the Five Dynasties and Ten Kingdoms Era, it was part of the briefly independent Kingdom of Zhao. The Later Jin reëstablished the prefecture again in 924 but it was again renamed Zhen Prefecture under the Later Han. The prefecture was reëstablished yet again under the Yuan, but with its seat relocated south to Quyang County in Baoding, Hebei.

The Sui Hengshan Commandery, formerly its Heng Prefecture, was listed as having 177,571 households in the 609 census. The Tang Heng Prefecture had a population of 54,543 living in 26,113 households during the 639 census and a population of 342,134 living in 54,633 households during the 742 census.

== See also ==
- Changshan/Hengshan Commandery
- Other Heng Prefectures
