= Changshan Commandery =

Historical commandery of China located in present-day southern Hebei province

Changshan Commandery (常山郡), or Hengshan Commandery (恒山郡), was a historical commandery of China, located in present-day southern Hebei province.

The commandery was established as Hengshan by the Qin state after it annexed the state of Zhao. After the foundation of Han dynasty, it became part of the Zhao Kingdom. During Empress Dowager Lü's reign, it was briefly granted to Liu Buyi (劉不疑), son of the Emperor Hui, as his fief. After the death of Buyi, the territory was first passed to Liu Hong, Emperor Houshao of Han, then it was granted to Liu Chao (劉朝), another son of Emperor Hui. During the defeat of the Lü clan, Liu Chao was killed and the territory again became a commandery of Zhao. The name was later changed to Changshan for the naming taboo of Emperor Wen of Han (personal name Liu Heng).

The territory became a separate principality in 145 BC during Emperor Jing's reign, and was granted to Liu Shun (劉舜). In 114 or 113 BC, Shun's successor Liu Bo (劉勃) was deposed for lack of filial piety and the principality was abolished. A brother of Bo, Liu Ping (劉平), was granted part of the former Changshan as the principality of Zhending (真定), while the remaining territories became Changshan Commandery. In late Western Han dynasty, the commandery administered 18 counties, namely Yuanshi (元氏), Shiyi (石邑), Sangzhong (桑中), Lingshou (靈壽), Puwu (蒲吾), Shangquyang (上曲陽), Jiumen (九門), Jingxing (井陘), Fangzi (房子), Zhongqiu (中丘), Fengsi (封斯), Guan (關), Pingji (平棘), Hao (鄗), Leyang (樂陽), Pingtai (平臺), Duxiang (都鄉) and Nanxingtang (南行唐). The population in 2 AD was 677,956, or 141,741 households.

Zhending was merged back in early Eastern Han dynasty, and the seat of the commandery was moved to Zhending County. The commandery became the fief of imperial princes several times during the Eastern Han. In 140 AD, the population was 631,184, or 97,500 households. From the Jin dynasty to the Northern and Southern Dynasties period, its territory was reduced as new commanderies were formed and counties were transferred to other commanderies.

The commandery was abolished in the early Sui dynasty. Later, Hengshan Commandery became an alternative name of Heng Prefecture. In 741, the name was again changed to Changshan. At the time, Changshan administered 11 counties and had a total population of 342,134.

== See also ==
- Heng Prefecture
