= Xin'an, Zhengding County =

Coordinates: 38°13′21″N 114°37′26″E

Xin'an, Zhengding County 新安镇
- Town

Chinese transcription(s)
- Interactive map of Xin'an, Zhengding County
- Country: China
- Province: Hebei
- Prefecture: Shijiazhuang
- County: Zhengding County
- Time zone: UTC+8 (China Standard Time)

Xin'an, Zhengding County (Chinese: 新安镇) is a township-level division of Zhengding County, Shijiazhuang, Hebei, China.

== See also ==
- List of township-level divisions of Hebei
