= Zhufutun =

Coordinates: 38°10′N 114°38′E

Zhufutun 诸福屯镇 Zhengding New Area
- Town

Chinese transcription(s)
- Interactive map of Zhufutun
- Country: China
- Province: Hebei
- Prefecture: Shijiazhuang
- County: Zhengding County
- Time zone: UTC+8 (China Standard Time)

Zhufutun (Chinese: 诸福屯镇) was a town of Zhengding County, Shijiazhuang, Hebei, China. In 2010, it forms the core area of Zhengding New Area. Since April 11, 2019, it has been split as Sanlitun Subdistrict and Zhufutun Subdistrict of Zhengding New Area. In 2017, Zhengding New Area was merged with Zhengding County and the territory of the previous Zhufutun Town is still informally called the Zhengding New Area.

== See also ==
- List of township-level divisions of Hebei
