= Nanlou Township =

Coordinates: 38.26504°N 114.54514°E

Nanlou Township 南楼乡
- Township

Chinese transcription(s)
- Interactive map of Nanlou Township
- Country: China
- Province: Hebei
- Prefecture: Shijiazhuang
- County: Zhengding County
- Time zone: UTC+8 (China Standard Time)

Nanlou Township (Chinese: 南楼乡) is a township-level division of Zhengding County, Shijiazhuang, Hebei, China.

== See also ==
- List of township-level divisions of Hebei
