= Zhengding County =

Zhengding County 正定县
- County
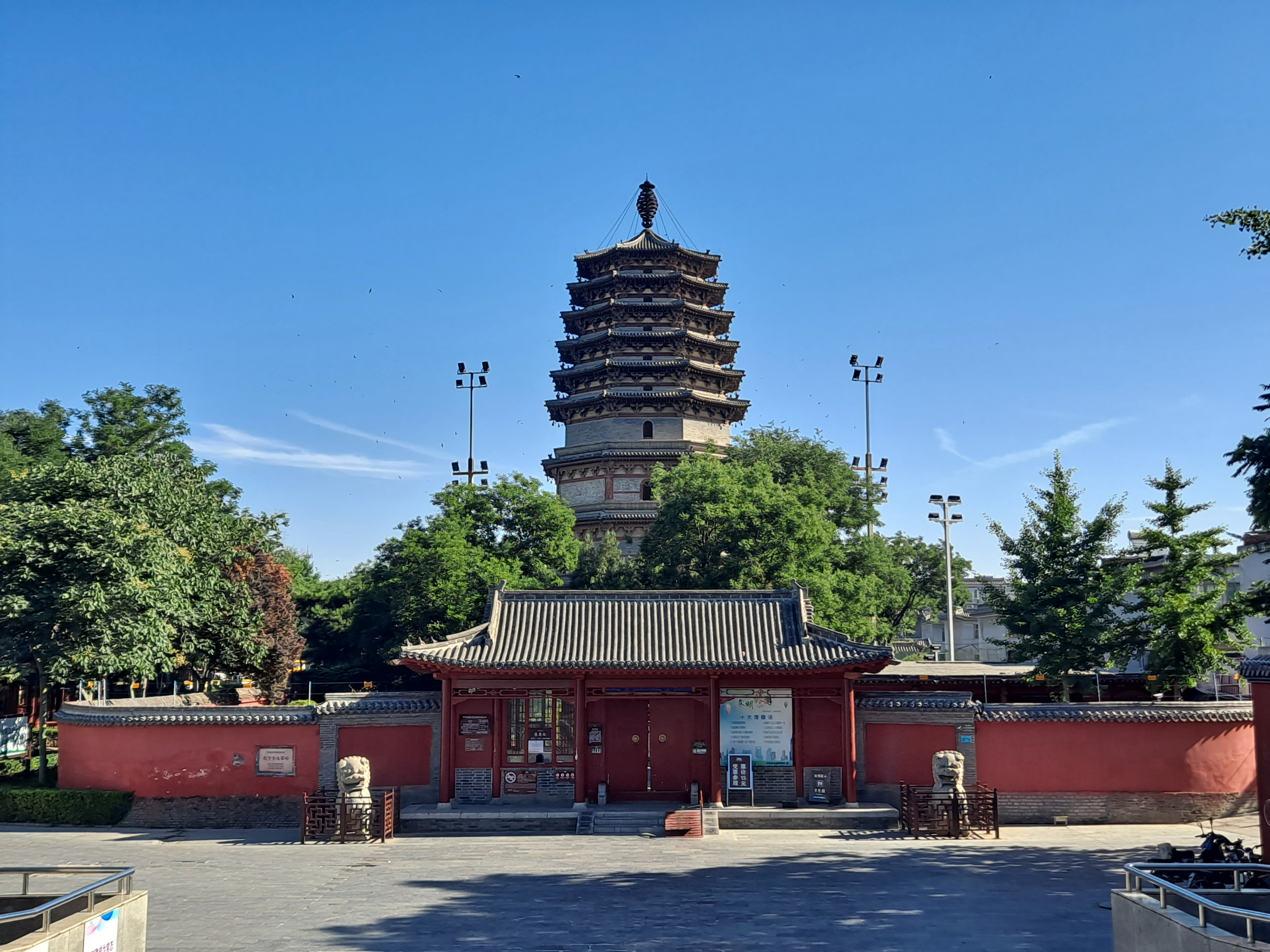
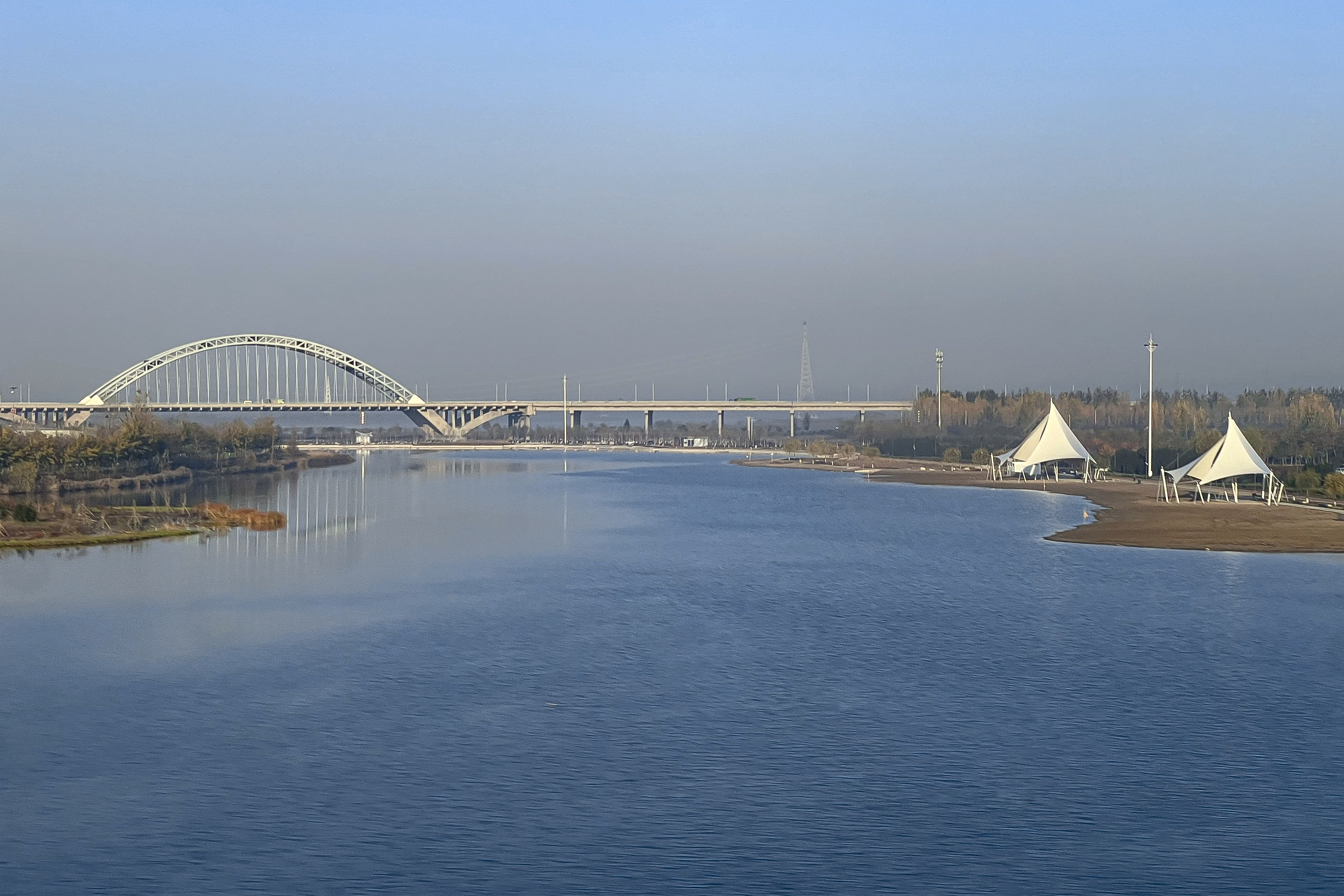
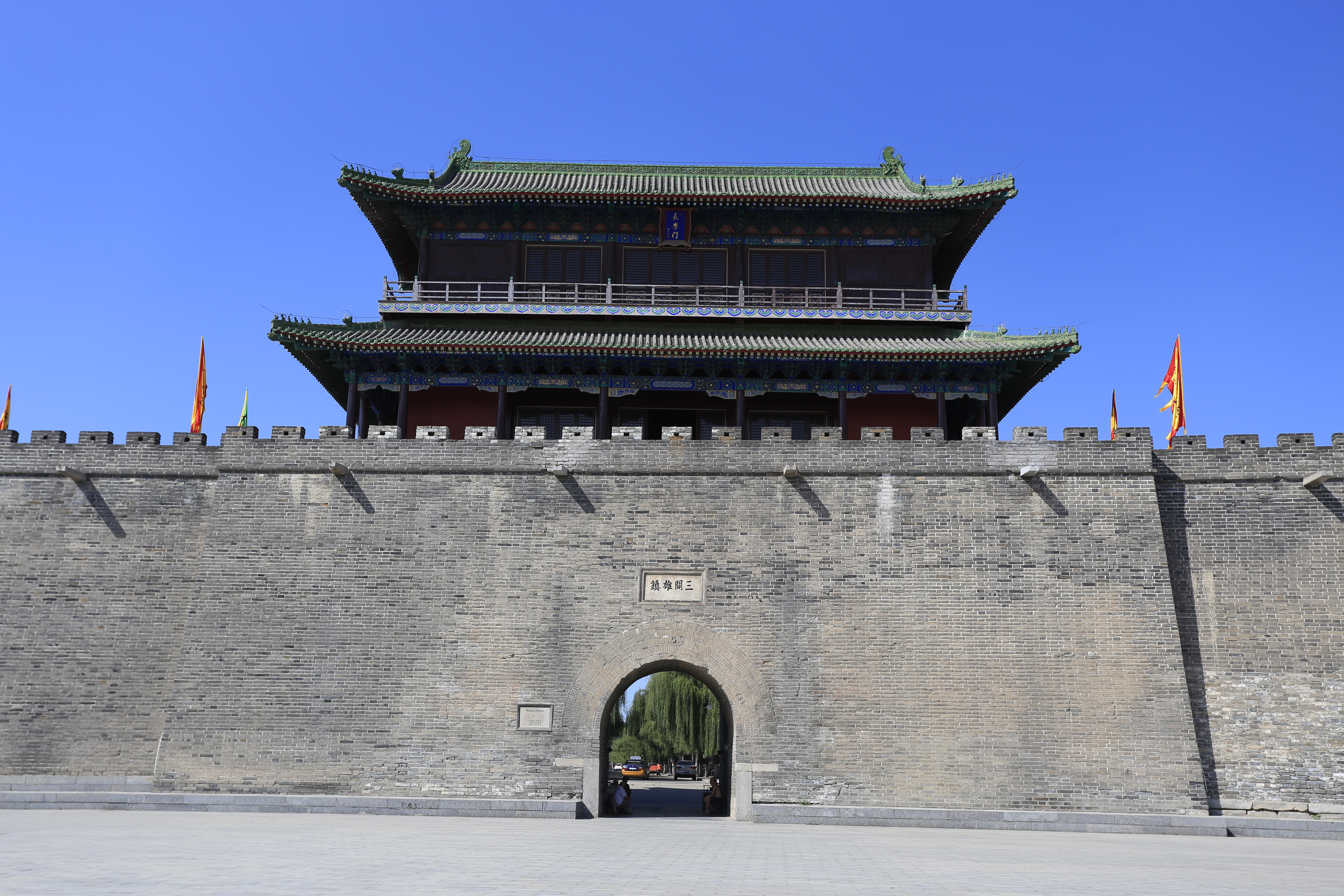
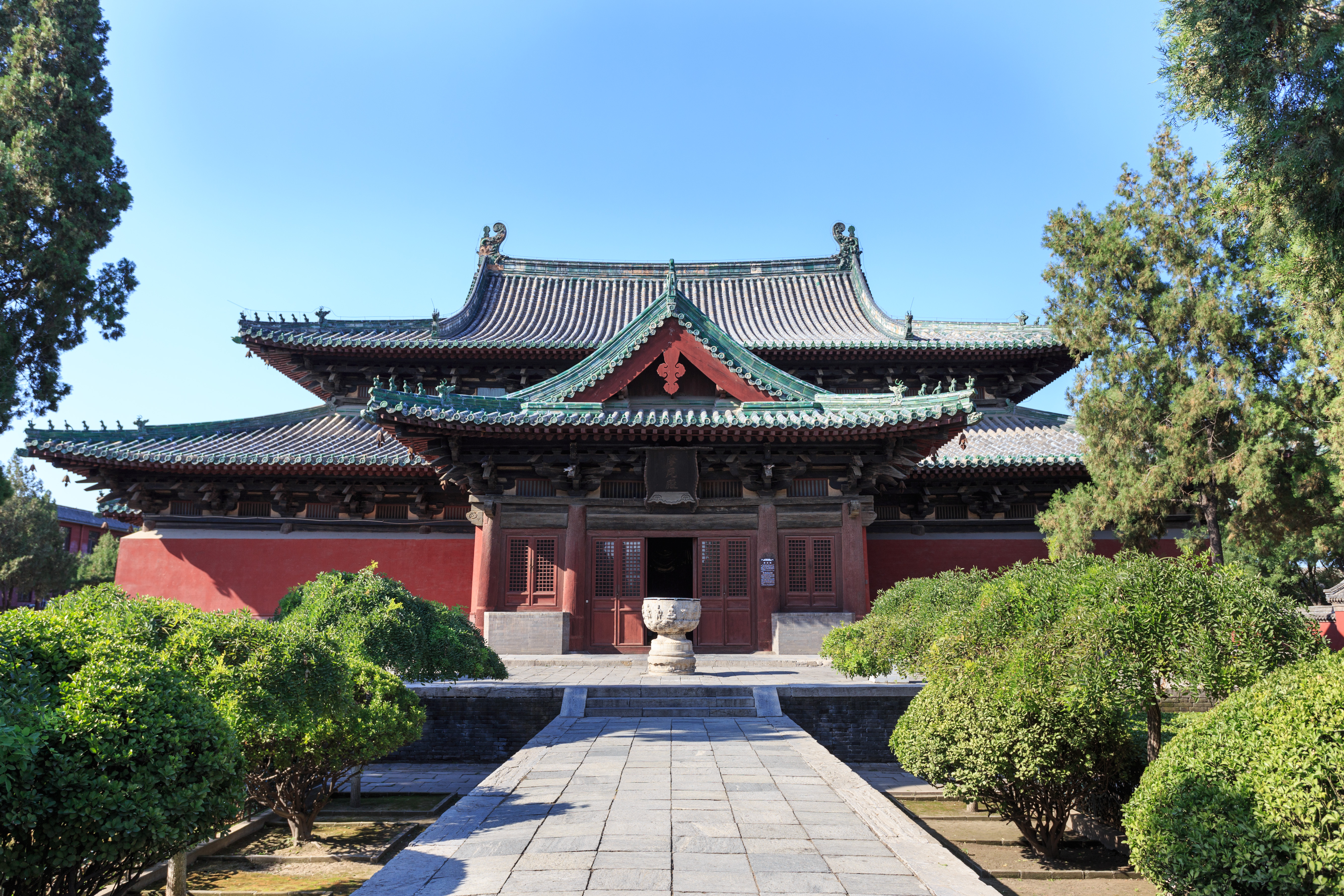
- Lingxiao Pagoda at Tianning Temple Hutuo River Zhengding City Wall Longxing Temple

- Location in Hebei Zhengding County (Shijiazhuang)
- Coordinates (County): 38°08′46″N 114°34′16″E
- Country: People's Republic of China
- Province: Hebei
- Prefecture-level city: Shijiazhuang

Area
  - Total: 468 km^{2} (181 sq mi)

Population
  - Total: 594,000
  - Density: 1,270/km^{2} (3,290/sq mi)
- Time zone: UTC+8 (China Standard)
- Website: www.zd.gov.cn

Zhengding County
- Traditional Chinese: 正定縣
- Simplified Chinese: 正定县
Transcriptions
Standard Mandarin
- Hanyu Pinyin: Zhèngdìng Xiàn
- Wade–Giles: Chêng-ting Hsien

Former names

Dongyuan
- Traditional Chinese: 東垣邑/縣
- Simplified Chinese: 东垣邑/县
- Literal meaning: City/County of the Eastern Rampart
Transcriptions
Standard Mandarin
- Hanyu Pinyin: Dōngyuán Yì/Xiàn
- Wade–Giles: Tung-yüan I/Hsien

Zhending
- Traditional Chinese: 真定
- Simplified Chinese: 真定
- Literal meaning: Truly Ordered
Transcriptions
Standard Mandarin
- Hanyu Pinyin: Zhēndìng
- Wade–Giles: Chên-ting

Changshan
- Chinese: 常山
Transcriptions
Standard Mandarin
- Hanyu Pinyin: Chángshān
- Wade–Giles: Ch'ang-shan

Hengshan
- Traditional Chinese: 恆山
- Simplified Chinese: 恒山
Transcriptions
Standard Mandarin
- Hanyu Pinyin: Héngshān
- Wade–Giles: Hêng-shan

Hengzhou
- Traditional Chinese: 恆州
- Simplified Chinese: 恒州
Transcriptions
Standard Mandarin
- Hanyu Pinyin: Héngzhōu
- Wade–Giles: Hêng-chou

Zhengding, formerly known by several other names, is a county in southwestern Hebei Province, North China, located approximately 260 km (160 mi) south of Beijing, capital of China. It is under the administration of the prefecture-level city of Shijiazhuang, the capital of the province, and has a population of 594,000. Zhengding has been an important religious center for more than 1,000 years, from at least the times of the Sui dynasty to the Qing dynasty. It is the founding place of several major schools of Chan Buddhism. However, many former religious building complexes have been severely damaged throughout history. A noted temple is the Longxing Monastery, where the historical building ensemble has been preserved almost intact. Furthermore, four famous pagodas, each with its own architectural style, are still standing.

== History ==
=== Prehistoric China ===
Archeological finds indicate that the area of Zhengding County has been settled since at least the early Neolithic Period.

=== Ancient China ===
During the Spring and Autumn period, the capital of the "White Di" Xianyu Kingdom was located in the area. In 489 BC, the state of Xianyu was destroyed by Jin and its territory came under Jin's administration. In 475 BC, Xianyu people established Zhongshan. One of their cities, Dongyuan, was established near present-day Zhengding. After decades of near continuous warfare, Zhongshan was finally conquered by its larger neighbor Zhao in 296 BC. In 240 BC, the Qin general and Nanyue emperor Zhao Tuo was born here.

=== Imperial China ===
Qin conquered Zhao in 234 BC, and its king Ying Zheng unified China as its First Emperor in the following decade. Under the Qin Empire, Dongyuan became the seat of an eponymous county within Julu Commandery.

The first emperor of the Han, Liu Bang, besieged the rebel Chen Xi at Dongyuan in the early 190s BC. The town's name was changed to Zhending in 114 BC under the Wu Emperor during the establishment of the Principality of Zhending for his cousin Liu Ping (劉平). At the beginning of the Eastern Han, the principality's territory was added to Changshan Commandery with Zhending becoming its new seat of government. Near the end of the Eastern Han dynasty, the You and Shu general Zhao Yun was born there.

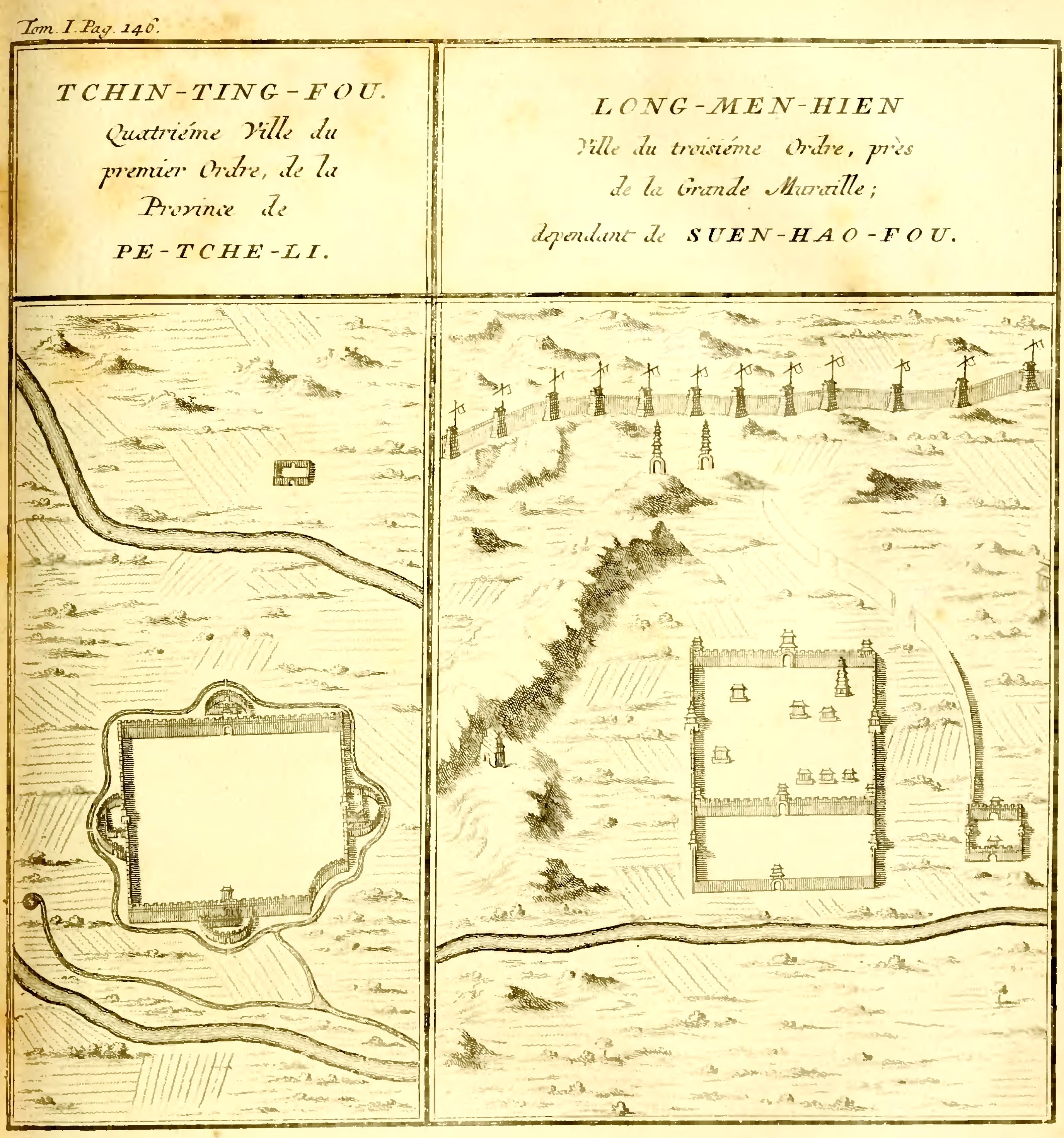
Maps of "Tching-ting-fou" and "Long-men-hien", towns of "Pe-tche-li", from Du Halde's 1735 Description of China, drawn from accounts by Jesuit missionaries.

Reestablished in 256 under the Western Jin, Changshan Commandery was subsequently repeatedly renamed and reorganized, including as Hengshan Commandery, Heng Prefecture (Hengzhou), and Zhen Prefecture (Zhenzhou). Under the Tang, the capital's location was moved a bit north, although it maintained the name Zhending or, from its role as a prefectural seat, Hengzhou and Zhenzhou. It was the capital of the de facto independent Chengde jiedushi and of the brief Kingdom of Zhao. In 923, during the Five Dynasties and Ten Kingdoms, the prefecture was renamed Zhengding Prefecture (正定郡), which was later rearranged into Zhengding Prefecture and Zhongshan County. Zhengding County was created during the Qing dynasty in 1723.

From the 4th century to 1911 Revolution, Zhengding was always the administrative center of its surrounding counties, prefectures, commanderies, and circuits. After the defeat in the First Sino-Japanese War, the Qing government vigorously implemented new reforms under the Self-Strengthening Movement. In 1896, the Qing government decided to construct the Lugouqiao-Hankou Railway and designated it as the main line, allowing neighboring provinces to build branch lines connecting to it. Shanxi Governor Hu Pinzhi submitted a memorial in June 1896 requesting the construction of a branch railway from Taiyuan to Zhengding, to be financed by foreign loans raised by the Shanxi Bureau of Commerce. The Guangxu Emperor approved the proposal on July 8, 1896.

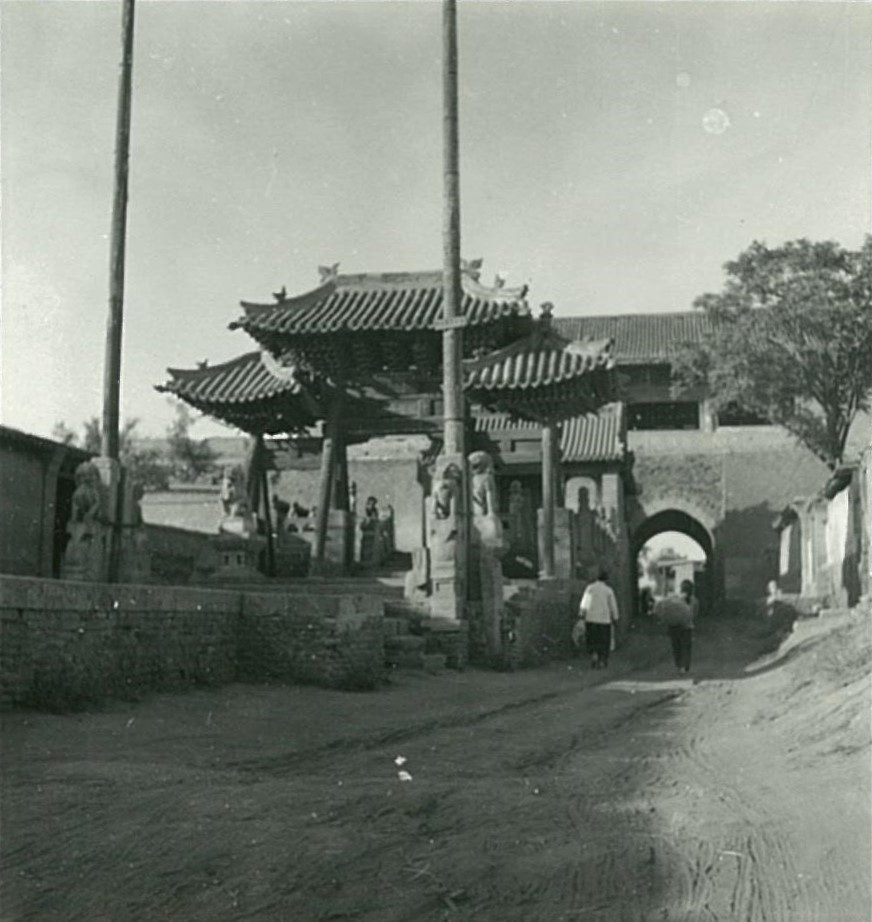
Zhengding in the 1920s

In May 1897, the Shanxi governor proposed securing a loan from the Russo-Chinese Bank (which was in fact controlled by French financial capital), and the imperial court issued an edict granting approval. The agreement stipulated that in order to avoid the cost of constructing a large bridge over the Hutuo River, the eastern terminus of the Zhengding–Taiyuan Railway would be moved southward from the city of Zhengding to Liulinpu (now Shijiazhuang City). Since that time, the position of Zhengding and Shijiazhuang has reversed. Shijiazhuang, literally meaning the "Shi Family Village", rose from a tiny settlement with only several dozen residents into the center of the prefecture, growing into a metropolis and being made capital of Hebei Province in 1968. Zhengding, meanwhile, languished and is now only a county-level city overseen by the Shijiazhuang government.

=== Modern China ===
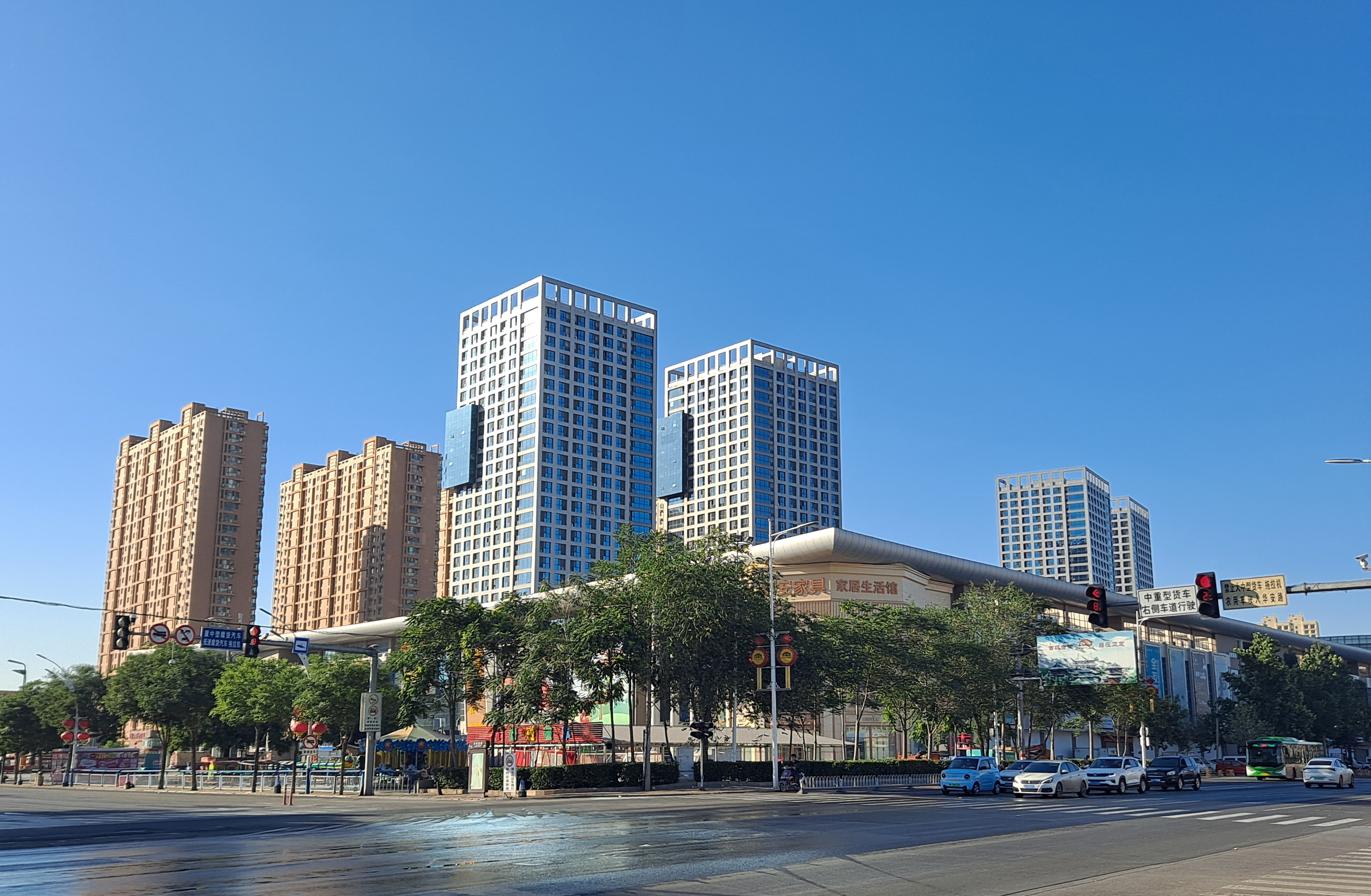
Downtown Zhengding

In 1949, the county was subordinated to Shijiazhuang Prefecture and in 1986, it came under the jurisdiction of the City of Shijiazhuang. The current Chinese Communist Party (CCP) general secretary and Chinese president Xi Jinping was in charge of Secretary of the county Party Committee between 1983 and 1985. As a princeling, son of Xi Zhongxun, he was assigned to this rural area on his own request. He is credited with promoting the local economy and reducing poverty by building a Qing dynasty-style mansion in the area for the filming of A Dream of Red Mansions and the Temple of Zhaoyun.

== Geography ==
=== Climate ===
Zhengding County ranges from 57.6 to 105.2 metres (189 to 345 ft) in elevation. It has a continental monsoon climate with four distinct seasons. The year-round averages are 13.6 °C (56.5 °F) for the temperature, 62% for the humidity, 474.4 millimetres (18.68 in) for the precipitation, and 2,736 hours for the sunshine time. The frost-free period exceeds 200 days per year.

Climate data for Zhengding, elevation 71 m (233 ft), (1991–2020 normals, extremes 1981–present)
Month	Jan	Feb	Mar	Apr	May	Jun	Jul	Aug	Sep	Oct	Nov	Dec	Year
Record high °C (°F)	17.8 (64.0)	24.4 (75.9)	31.7 (89.1)	35.0 (95.0)	38.9 (102.0)	44.0 (111.2)	42.8 (109.0)	40.1 (104.2)	39.1 (102.4)	33.4 (92.1)	26.7 (80.1)	21.2 (70.2)	44.0 (111.2)
Mean daily maximum °C (°F)	3.5 (38.3)	7.7 (45.9)	14.8 (58.6)	22.0 (71.6)	27.9 (82.2)	32.5 (90.5)	32.7 (90.9)	30.9 (87.6)	27.2 (81.0)	20.8 (69.4)	11.6 (52.9)	5.0 (41.0)	19.7 (67.5)
Daily mean °C (°F)	−1.5 (29.3)	2.1 (35.8)	8.9 (48.0)	15.9 (60.6)	22.0 (71.6)	26.5 (79.7)	27.8 (82.0)	26.2 (79.2)	21.7 (71.1)	15.1 (59.2)	6.5 (43.7)	0.3 (32.5)	14.3 (57.7)
Mean daily minimum °C (°F)	−5.5 (22.1)	−2.2 (28.0)	3.8 (38.8)	10.5 (50.9)	16.4 (61.5)	21.2 (70.2)	23.6 (74.5)	22.3 (72.1)	17.4 (63.3)	10.6 (51.1)	2.6 (36.7)	−3.3 (26.1)	9.8 (49.6)
Record low °C (°F)	−16.3 (2.7)	−19.8 (−3.6)	−7.7 (18.1)	−1.1 (30.0)	4.9 (40.8)	10.9 (51.6)	15.5 (59.9)	14.1 (57.4)	5.8 (42.4)	−3.2 (26.2)	−9.8 (14.4)	−21.5 (−6.7)	−21.5 (−6.7)
Average precipitation mm (inches)	2.8 (0.11)	4.9 (0.19)	9.5 (0.37)	24.7 (0.97)	36.8 (1.45)	62.8 (2.47)	131.3 (5.17)	126.6 (4.98)	53.8 (2.12)	23.8 (0.94)	15.7 (0.62)	3.1 (0.12)	495.8 (19.51)
Average precipitation days (≥ 0.1 mm)	2.1	2.5	2.7	5.0	6.0	8.5	11.9	10.7	7.2	5.3	3.8	2.3	68
Average snowy days	2.4	2.5	1.1	0.2	0	0	0	0	0	0	1.3	2.5	10
Average relative humidity (%)	53	50	46	51	54	56	70	74	67	62	61	57	58
Mean monthly sunshine hours	152.8	163.0	211.1	237.8	264.8	232.7	196.4	194.2	194.9	185.0	159.9	146.2	2,338.8
Percentage possible sunshine	50	53	57	60	60	53	44	47	53	54	53	50	53
Source: China Meteorological Administrationall-time extreme temperatureProvincial all time August record high

=== Administrative Divisions ===
As of 2020, Zhengding County administers 2 subdistricts, 4 towns and 3 townships, which in turn control 174 villages and 186 natural villages.

Subdistrict:

- Zhufutun (诸福屯街道), Sanlitun (三里屯街道)

Towns:

- Zhengding Town (正定镇), Xin'an (新安镇), Xinchengpu (新城铺镇), Nangang (南岗镇), Quyangqiao Town (曲阳桥镇)

Townships:

- Xipingle Township (西平乐乡), Nanniu Township (南牛乡), Nanlou Township (南楼乡)

== Sites ==
=== Confucian Temple ===
==== Confucian Temple of the County ====
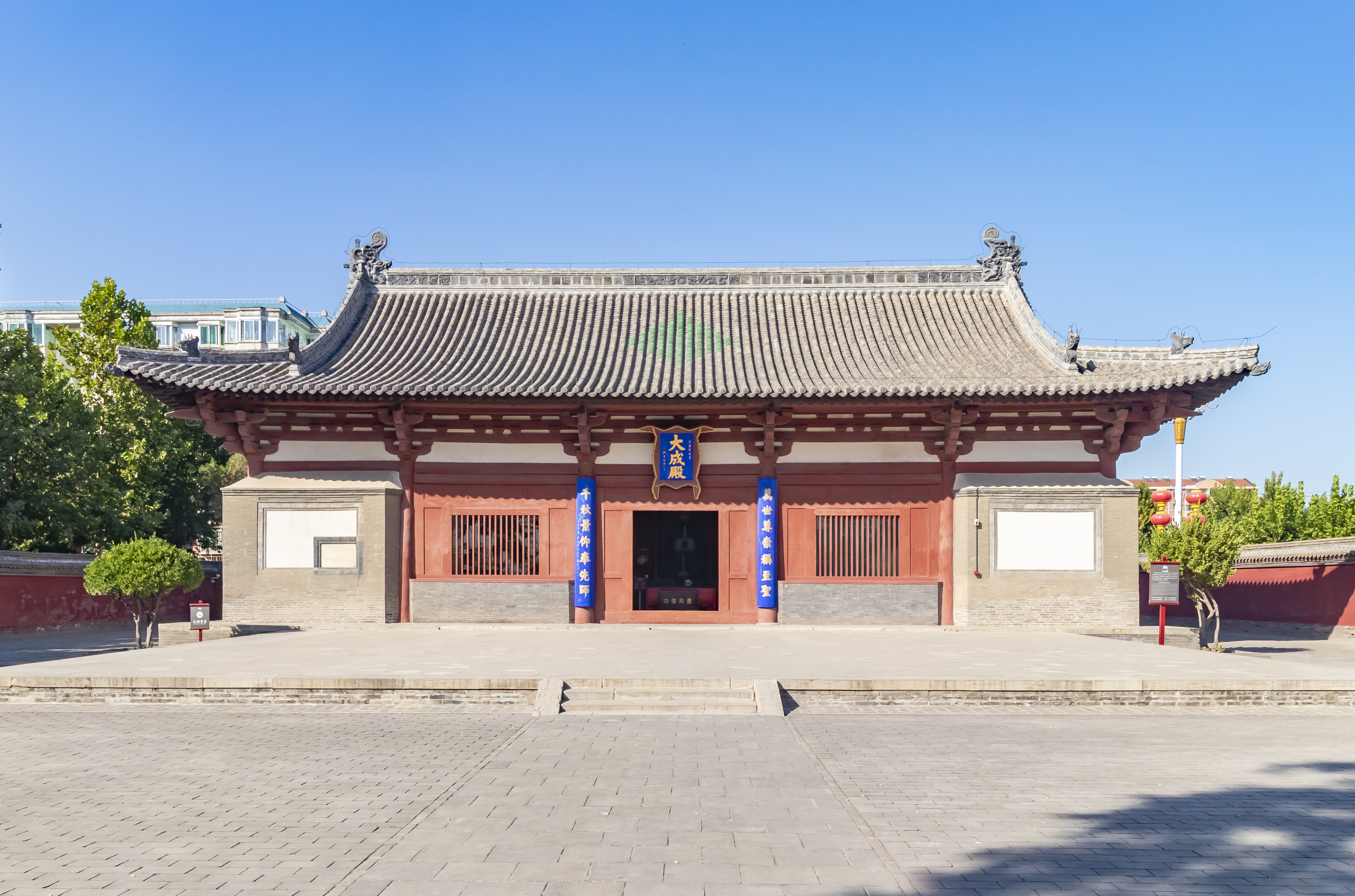
Confucian Temple of the County

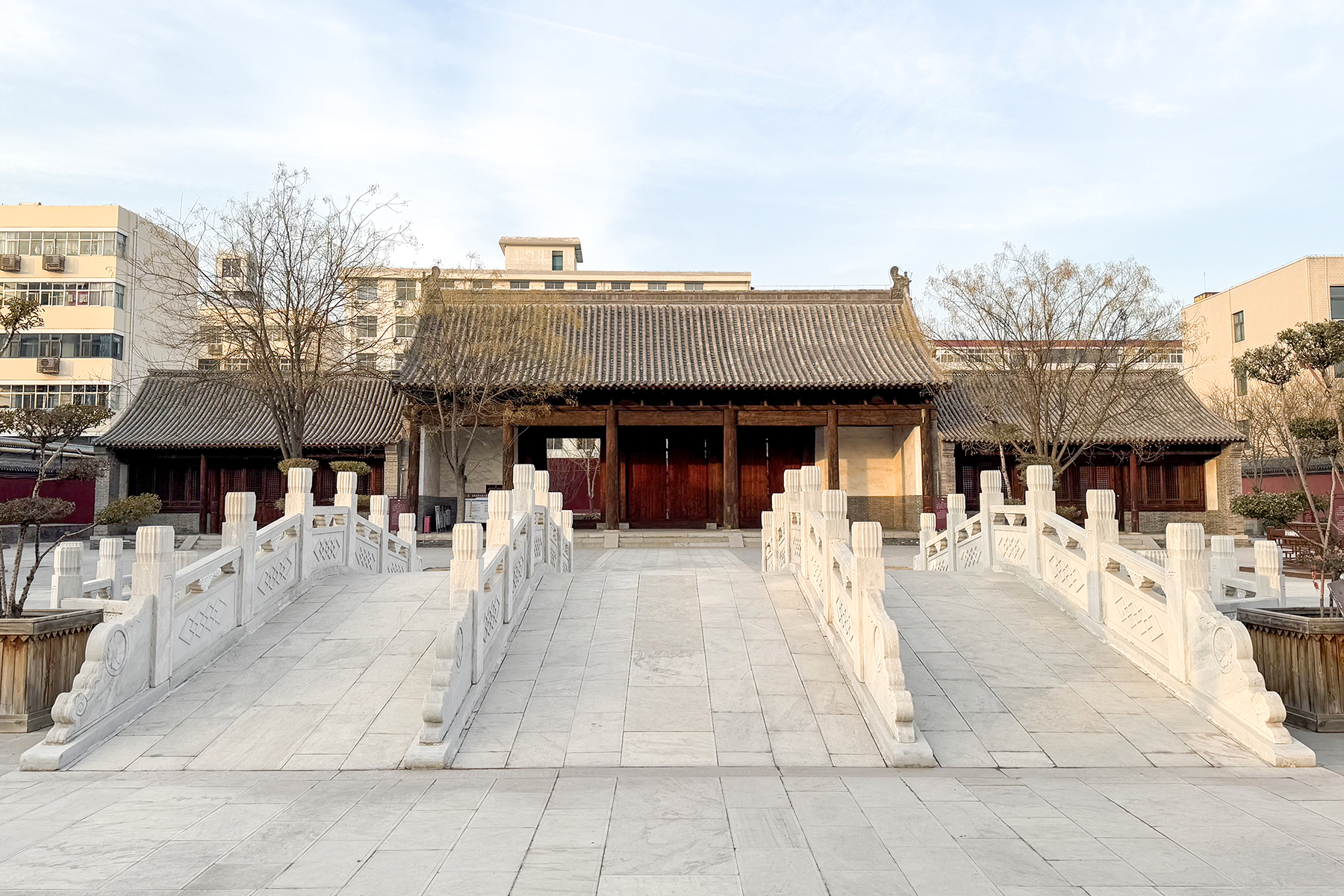
Confucian Temple of the Prefecture

The Zhengding County Confucian Temple is located on the west side of Yucai Street in the Old Town of Zhengding; it faces south with its back to the north. According to the county annals, it was built in 1374, but based on architectural style, it is believed to have been constructed in the late Tang or early Five Dynasties period.

The existing structures include a screen wall, a Pan Pool (泮池), a Halberd Gate (戟門), east and west side halls, and the Main Hall of Dacheng (大成殿), which is considered the earliest surviving Dacheng Hall of a Confucian temple in China.

==== Confucian Temple of the Prefecture ====
The Zhengding Prefectural Confucian Temple was founded in 1070. It underwent several renovations during the Northern Song, Jin, Yuan, Ming, and Qing dynasties. At the beginning of the People's Republic of China, the main architectural structures were still largely intact. The central axis of the complex included a ceremonial archway, Lingxing Gate, Pan Pool, Pan Bridge, Shrine of Notable Officials, Shrine of Worthy Locals, Halberd Gate, East and West Side Halls, Dacheng Hall, the Ancestral Hall of Reverence, and the Shrine of the Six Loyalists.

In late October 2018, Zhengding County authorities began studying the possibility of acquiring surrounding residential buildings to develop the temple site. By the end of November, official notices and announcements had been issued, and plans for developing the site were finalized. By December 2019, the Halberd Gate and its flanking rooms had been restored, and the residential buildings in front of the gate had been demolished, resulting in the creation of a public plaza. This redevelopment allowed the temple to reemerge as part of the broader cultural and tourism landscape of historic Zhengding. The temple stands as a rare and important monument of Confucian culture in northern China, embodying over 900 years of educational and ceremonial tradition.

=== Temples ===
==== Longxing Temple ====
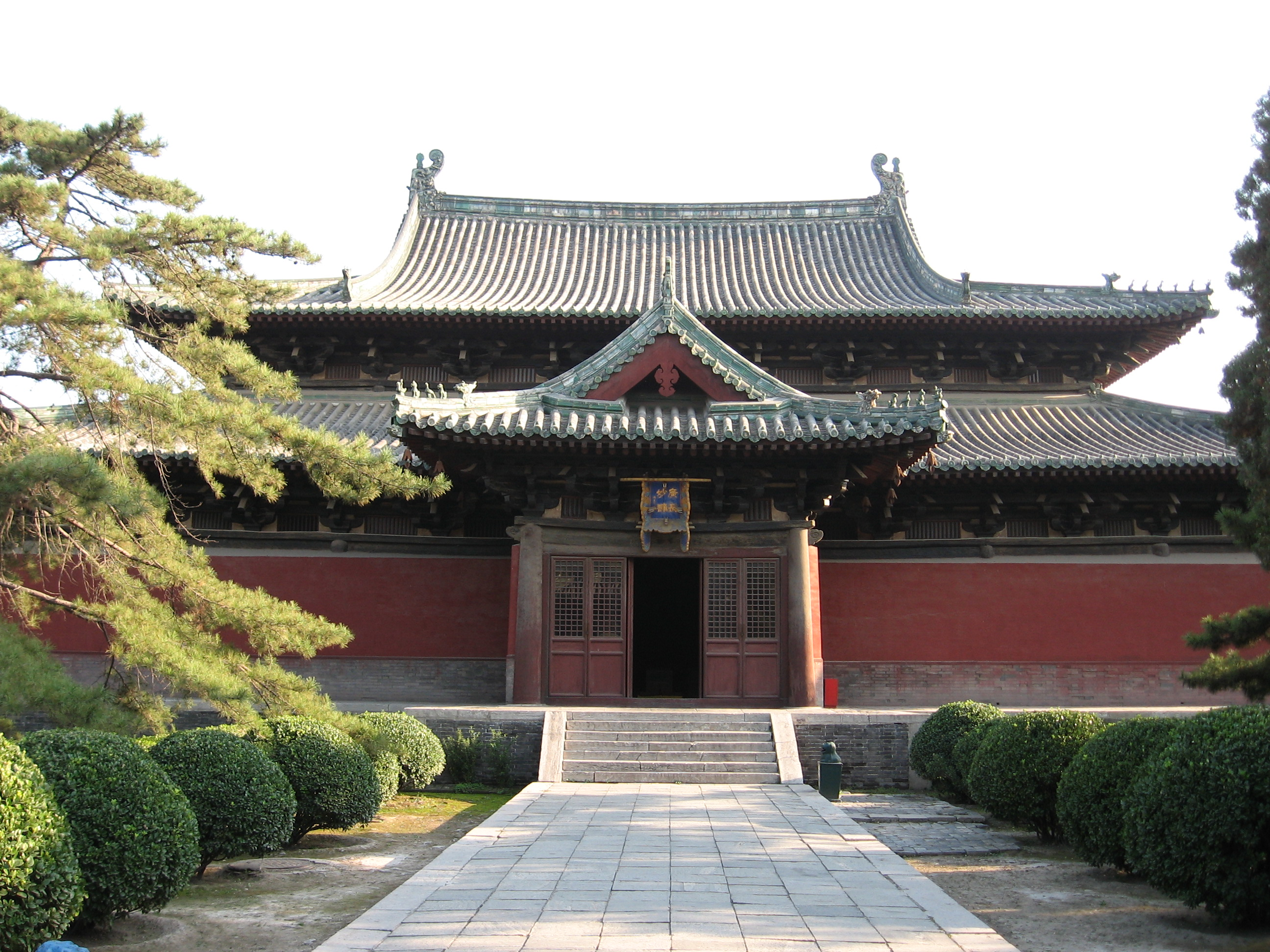
Longxing temple

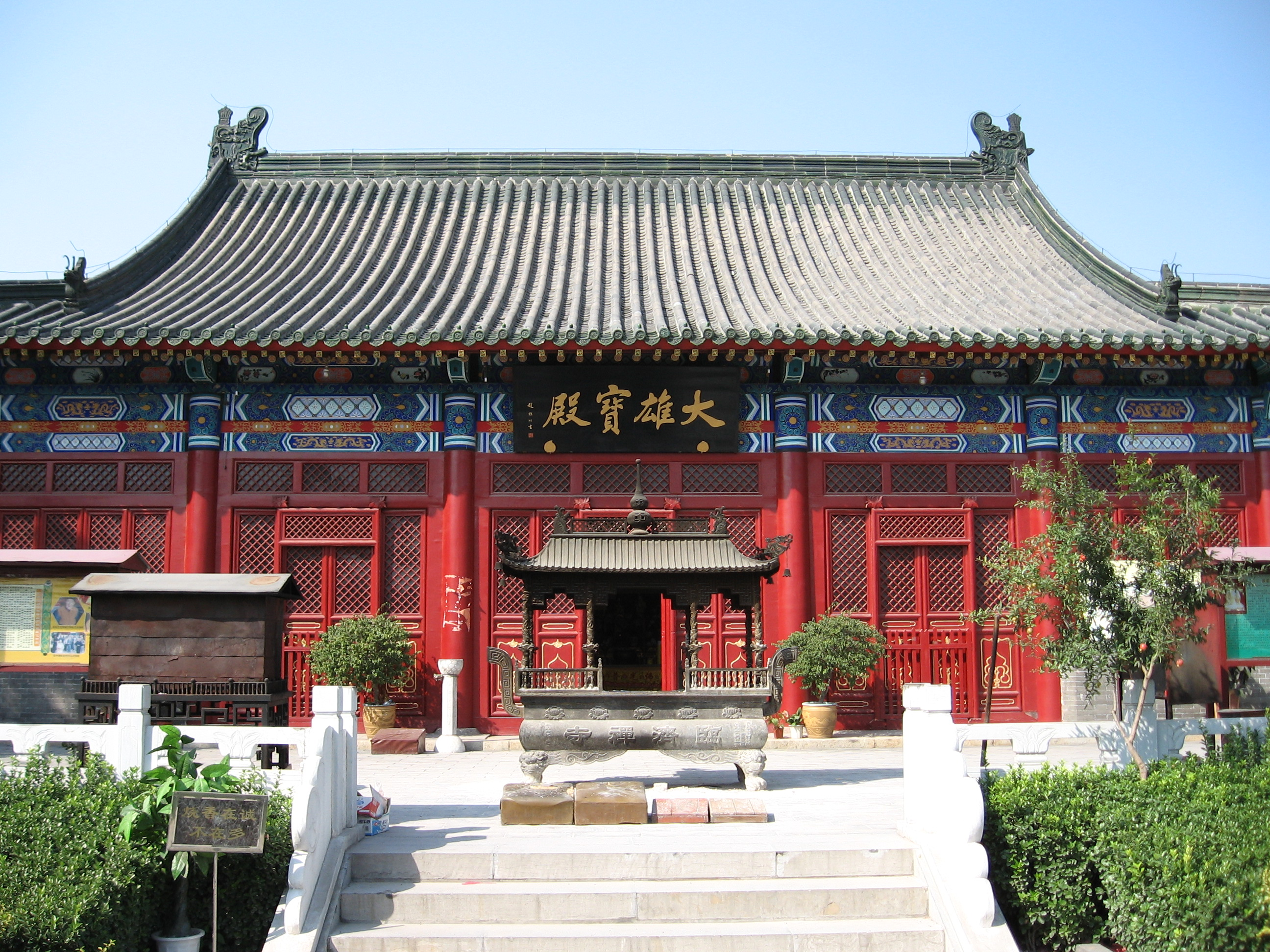
Linji Temple

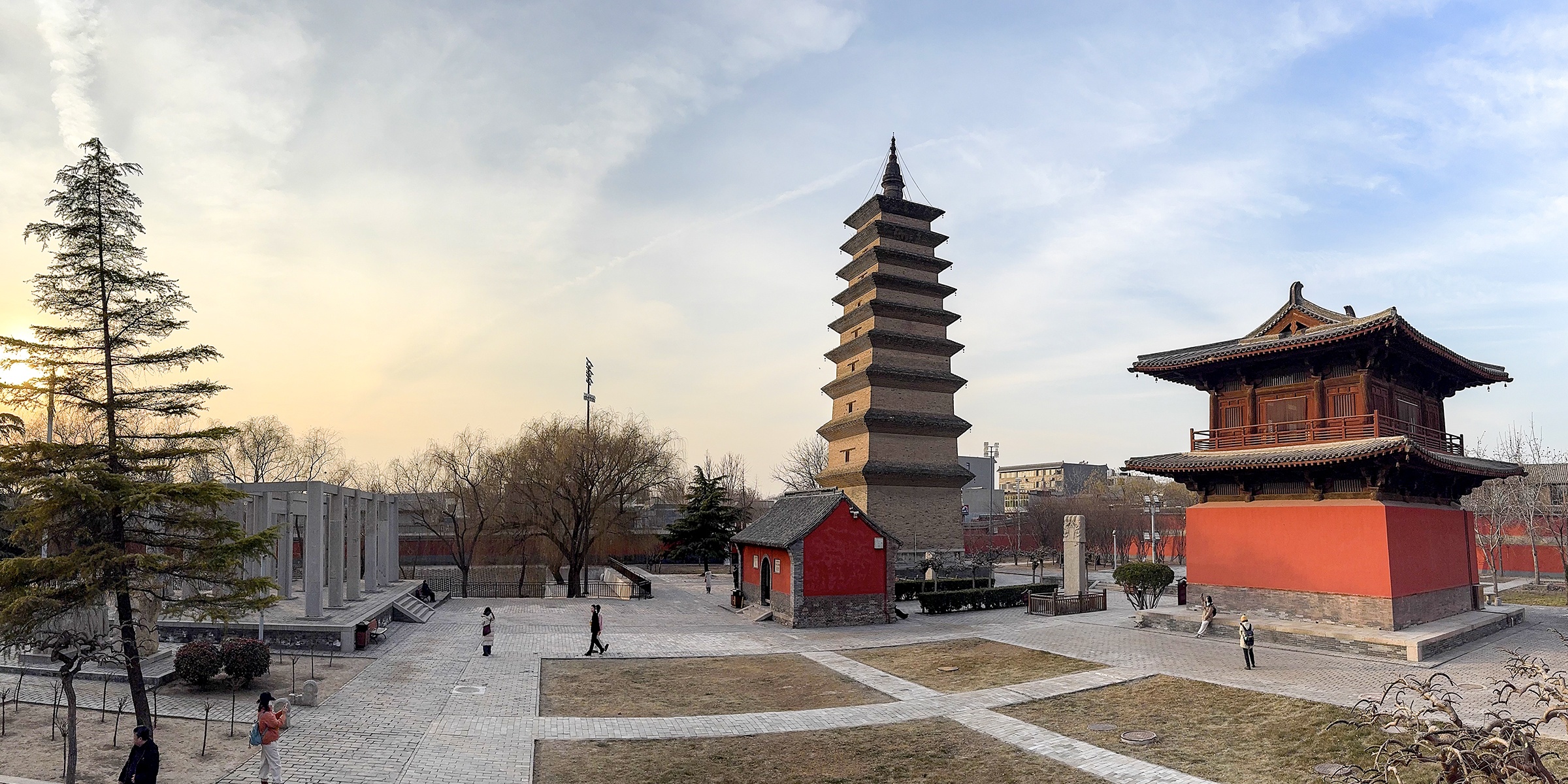
Kaiyuan Temple

Longxing Temple, also known as the Great Buddha Temple, Longzang Temple, or Longxing Monastery, was originally built during the Sui dynasty. Notable structures within the temple include the Hall of Mani, the Rotating Sutra Library Hall, and the Great Compassion Pavilion, which houses a statue of the Thousand-Armed, Thousand-Eyed Avalokiteshvara depicted with forty-two arms. The temple also preserves numerous Buddhist statues cast during the Tang and Song dynasties, all considered rare and priceless treasures.

==== Linji Temple ====
Linji Temple is one of the five major schools of Buddhism in China. In the Song dynasty (960–1276), two Japanese monks Eisai and Shuniyo introduced Linji school to Japan. Linji Temple is the cradle of Linji (Rinzai) school of both Chinese and Japanese Buddhism. The temple was added to National Key Buddhist Temples in Han Chinese Area's list in 1983. The eldest thing in the temple is the Chengling Stupa, which still preserves the architectural style of the Liao and Jin dynasties (916–1234).

==== Kaiyuan Temple ====
Kaiyuan Temple, originally named Jingguan Temple and later renamed Jiehui Temple, is located on the west side of Changsheng Street in Zhengding. It was first built during the Northern and Southern Dynasties period. The temple was damaged in the late Qing dynasty, and today only the Bell Tower and the Sumeru Pagoda remain. The Bell Tower was initially constructed in 540 AD (during Eastern Wei) and was rebuilt during the Tang dynasty (898 AD). It is the only surviving example of a Tang dynasty bell tower. The tower has a two-story structure, stands 14 meters high, and has a square floor plan with three bays in both width and depth. The roof is a double-eaved hip-and-gable style covered with green tiles. In History of Chinese Architecture, Liang Sicheng observed that "the lower story's outer eaves appear to follow the Jin and Yuan style, while the upper story was renovated during the Qing dynasty." The grand dougong brackets are a distinctive feature of Tang dynasty wooden architecture.

=== Pagodas ===
==== Chengling Pagoda ====
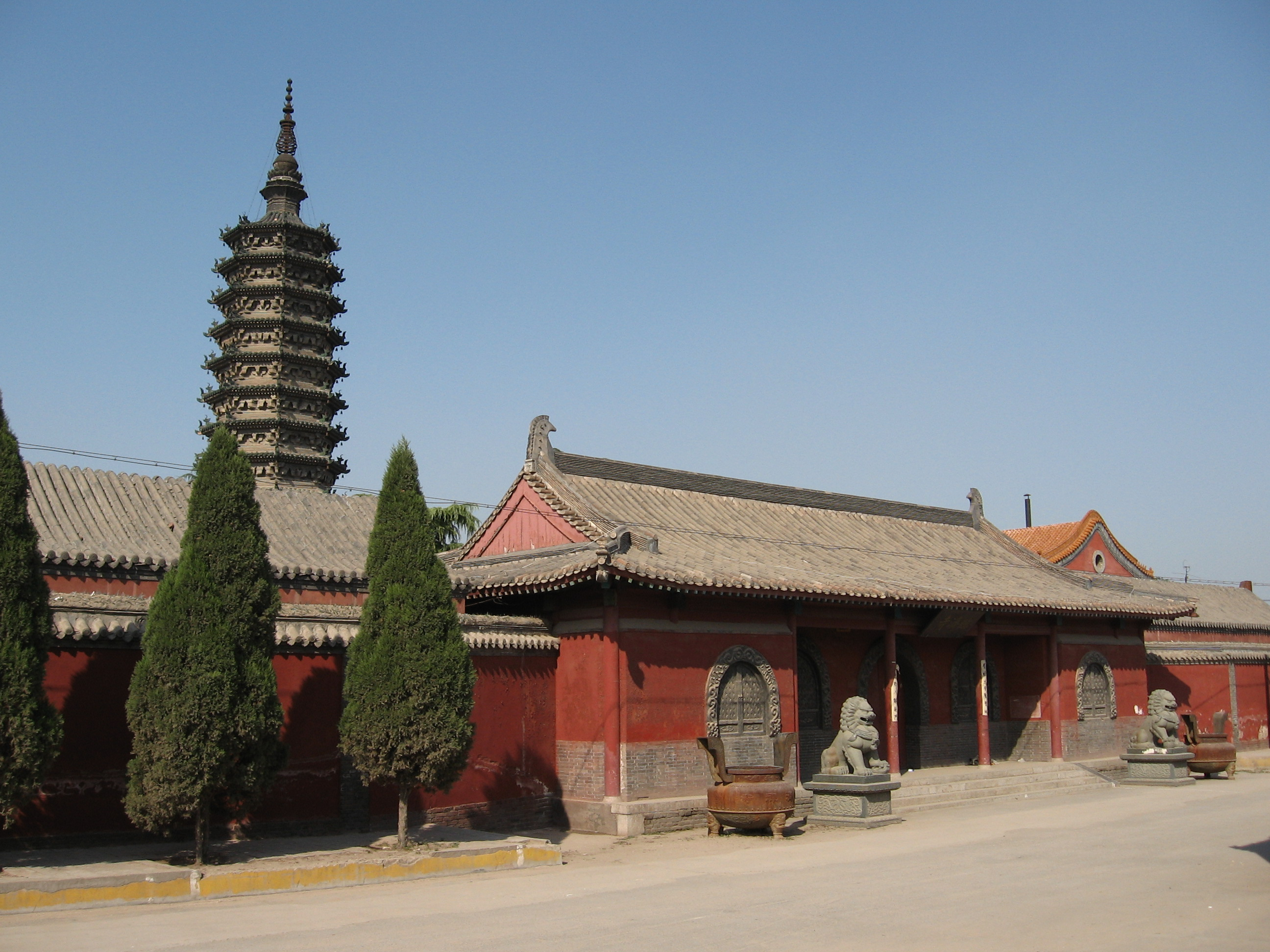
Chengling Pagoda (background) and the Linji Temple (foreground)

The Chengling Pagoda (Chengling Ta) is built from gray bricks, it is also known as the Grey Pagoda. It is located in the Village of Linji to the south of Zhengding and was formerly part of the Linji Temple. The Linji Temple was built during the times of the Eastern Wei dynasty in 540. During the Tang dynasty, it became the site where the monk Linji Yixuan founded the Linji School, one of the five schools of Chinese Chan Buddhism. Both Linji Yixuan and the Linji School derive their names from the village. The pagoda was first built in 867 to serve as a shrine for the mantle and alms bowl of Linji Yixuan. The original pagoda was ruined and replaced during 1161 to 1189 (Jin dynasty) by the present-day structure. The present pagoda stands on a substructure known as a Sumeru Pedestal after the mythic Mount Sumeru and has an octagonal cross-section. It has nine multi-eared storeys and a total height of 33 meters. Its pedestal is richly decorated. Because it is seen as one of the birthplaces of Zen Buddhism, the Chengling Pagoda is favorite site for pilgrims and tourists from Japan.

==== Lingxiao Pagoda ====
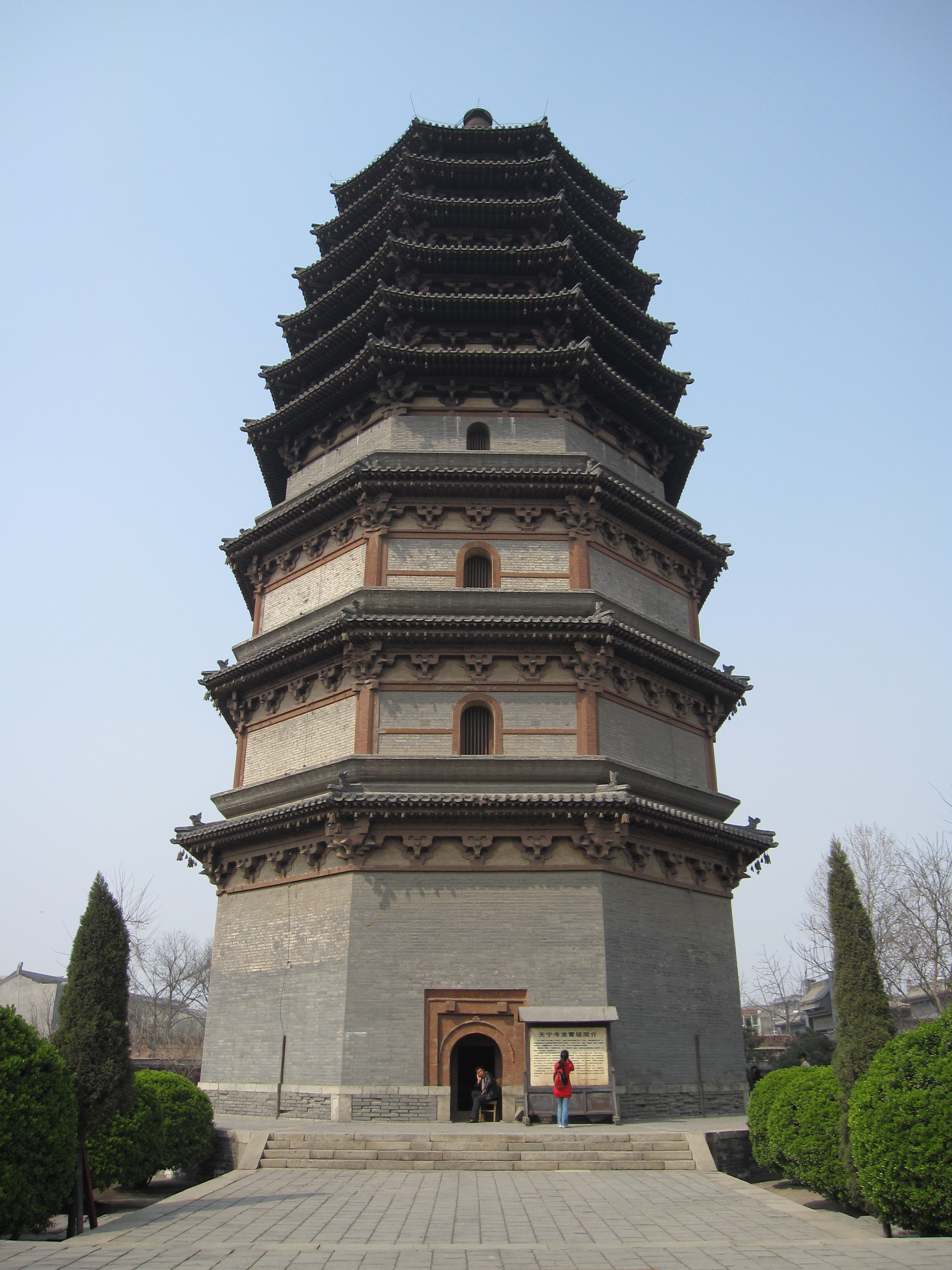
Lingxiao Pagoda

The Lingxiao Pagoda, also known as the Wooden Pagoda, is a wood-and-brick construction, which was formerly part of Tianning Monastery, located to the west of Longxing Monastery. It was recorded to have been first built in 860 during the Tang dynasty, it has undergone many repairs and rebuildings since then. The architectural style of the present-day pagoda was created during the Song dynasty in 1045 and was left unchanged during later repairs. The pagoda has an octagonal floor plan, nine storeys, and a total height of 41 meters. The four lowest storeys are made from bricks decorated with wooden eaves. From the fifth storey upwards, the pagoda construction is entirely made of wood, constructed around a central pillar. While storey height continuously decreases from the bottom to the top of the pagoda, this decrease is particularly steep in the five upper wooden storeys. The pagoda carries a cast iron spire at its top as well. It is at the foot of this pagoda, that Dutch bishop Mgr. Frans Schraven (1873–1937) and his companions suffered their martyrdom in 1937, at the hands of the Japanese army, because of their refusal to hand over to the soldiers the Chinese women and girls whom had taken refuge in his compound.

==== Xumi Pagoda ====
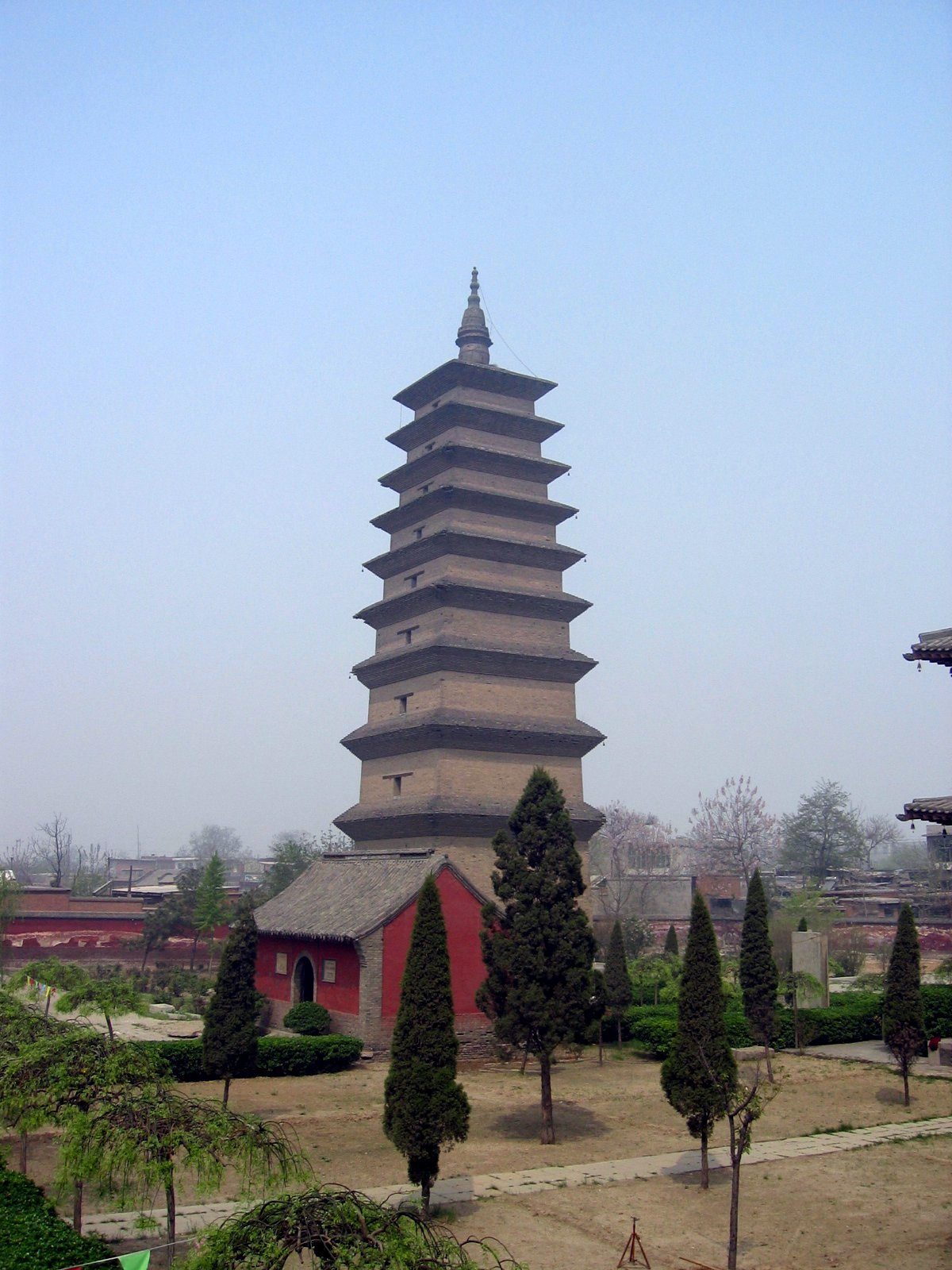
Xumi Pagoda

The Xumi Pagoda, named for the mythical Mount Sumeru, also known as Summer Pagoda, is part of Kaiyuan Monastery which is located to the west of Zhengding. It was erected from stone and bricks and is at 48 meters the tallest pagoda in Zhengding. The pagoda has an austere geometric design with a square floor plan set on a stone platform which is likewise square-shaped. Stones have also been used in the lower part of the first storey. The Xumi Pagoda was built during the Tang dynasty in 636. Apart from a wooden ceiling over the first storey (of which no floorboards remain), the inside of the pagoda is hollow and there is no staircase either. Among the rather plain decorations on the outside are thirteen tiers of eaves as well as stone carvings of the Heavenly Kings at the corners of the stone platform. The pagoda is one of originally four fiducial buildings on the grounds of the Kaiyuan Monastery: Tianwang Hall in the front and Fachuan Hall (now in ruins) in the back, a bell tower (built in 540 during the Eastern Wei dynasty, renovated in 898 during the Tang dynasty) in the east and the pagoda in the west. Today, the Monastery is largely destroyed and the Xumi pagoda stands surrounded by trees.

==== Hua Pagoda ====
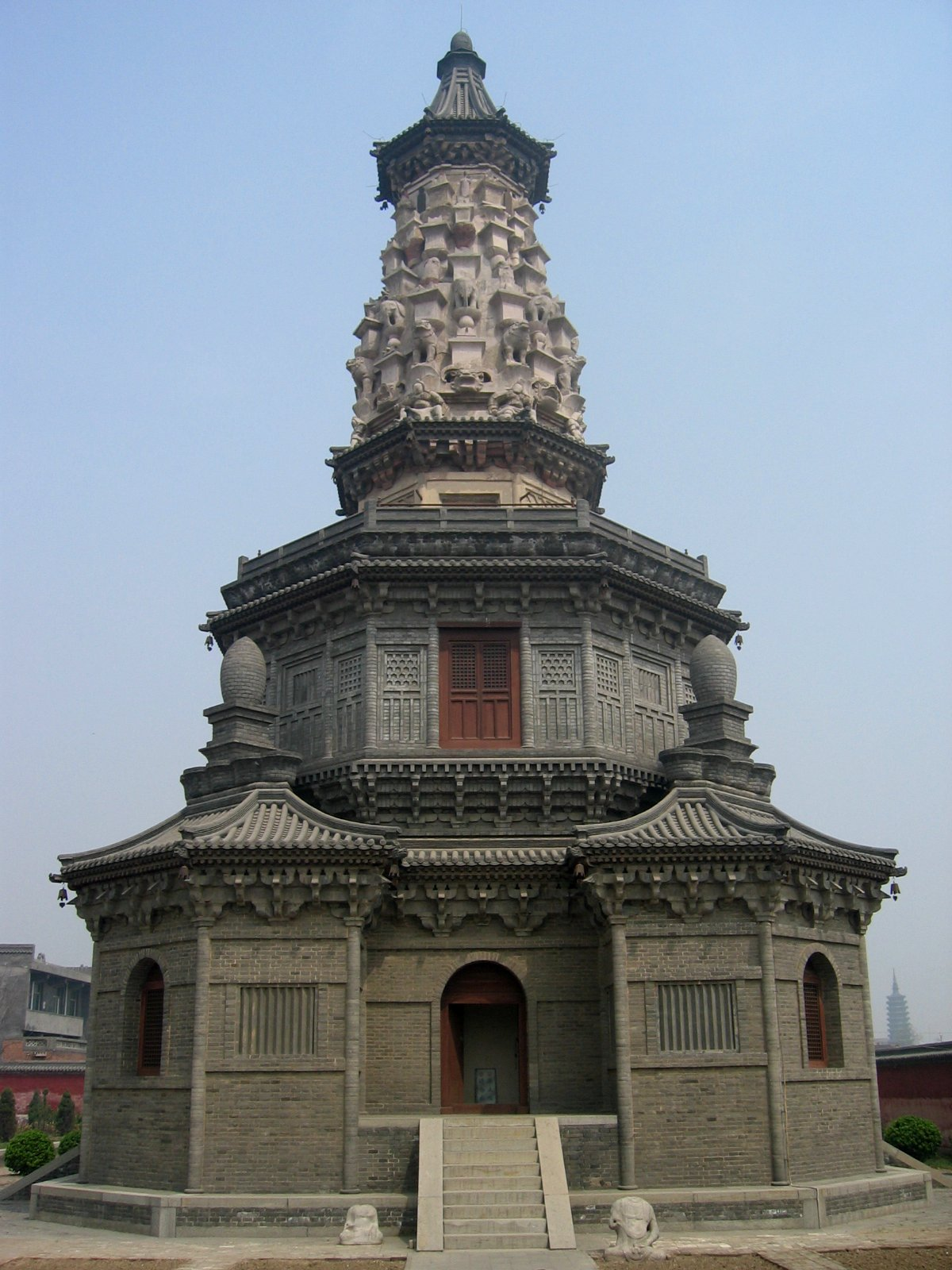
Hua Pagoda

The Guanghui Temple Huatai Pagoda, called the Hua Pagoda (Hua Ta, lit.: Flower Pagoda, part of Guanghui Temple (Chinese: 广惠寺; pinyin: Guǎnghuì Sì), in the south of Zhengding) is a four-storey brick building with an unconventional shape and a total height of approximately 40 meters. While the lower three storeys have an octagonal floor plan, the fourth storey has a circular layout over which the walls taper towards the tip giving the storey a conical shape. On the outside, this storey is richly decorated with carvings of Buddhas, elephants, and aquatic animals. Another unusual feature of the Hua Pagoda or four small attached buildings, which are pagodas themselves and crowned with an egg-shaped tip. These were once lost but have recently been completely restored. The Hua Pagoda was first erected during the Tang dynasty. The present-day structure dates back to a rebuilt during the time of the Jin dynasty.

Overview of Pagodas in Zhengding
Name	Construction	Height	Number of storeys	Floor plan	First built	Present form dates from
Chengling Pagoda	brick	33 m	9	octagon	Eastern Wei dynasty (540)	Jin dynasty (1161–1189)
Lingxiao Pagoda	wood and brick	41 m	9	octagon	Tang dynasty (762–779)	Song dynasty (1045)
Xumi Pagoda	stone and brick	48 m	13 outside, 2 inside	square	Tang dynasty (636)	Tang dynasty
Hua Pagoda	brick	40 m	4	octagon, circle	Tang dynasty	Jin dynasty

=== Bixi ===
In June 2000, a gigantic bixi turtle was unearthed in Zhengding's Fuqian Street (府前街). The stone turtle, which originally must have supported a similarly giant stone tablet, is 8.4 m long, 3.2 m wide, and 2.6 m tall, and weighs 107 tons. It is estimated to be around 1200 years old. It has since been moved to Kaiyuan Temple.

== Transportation ==
Zhengding has several important railway and road connections, namely the Beijing–Guangzhou, Shijiazhuang–Taiyuan, and Shijiazhuang–Dezhou railways (石德铁路), and the Beijing–Hong Kong and Macau and Qingdao–Yinchuan Expressways.

Line 1 of Shijiazhuang Metro have 4 stations in Zhengding County.

Shijiazhuang Zhengding International Airport (SJW/ZBSJ) is located in the county's northeast corner; the Zhengding Airport railway station on the new Beijing–Guangzhou–Shenzhen–Hong Kong High-Speed Railway is nearby.

== Gallery ==
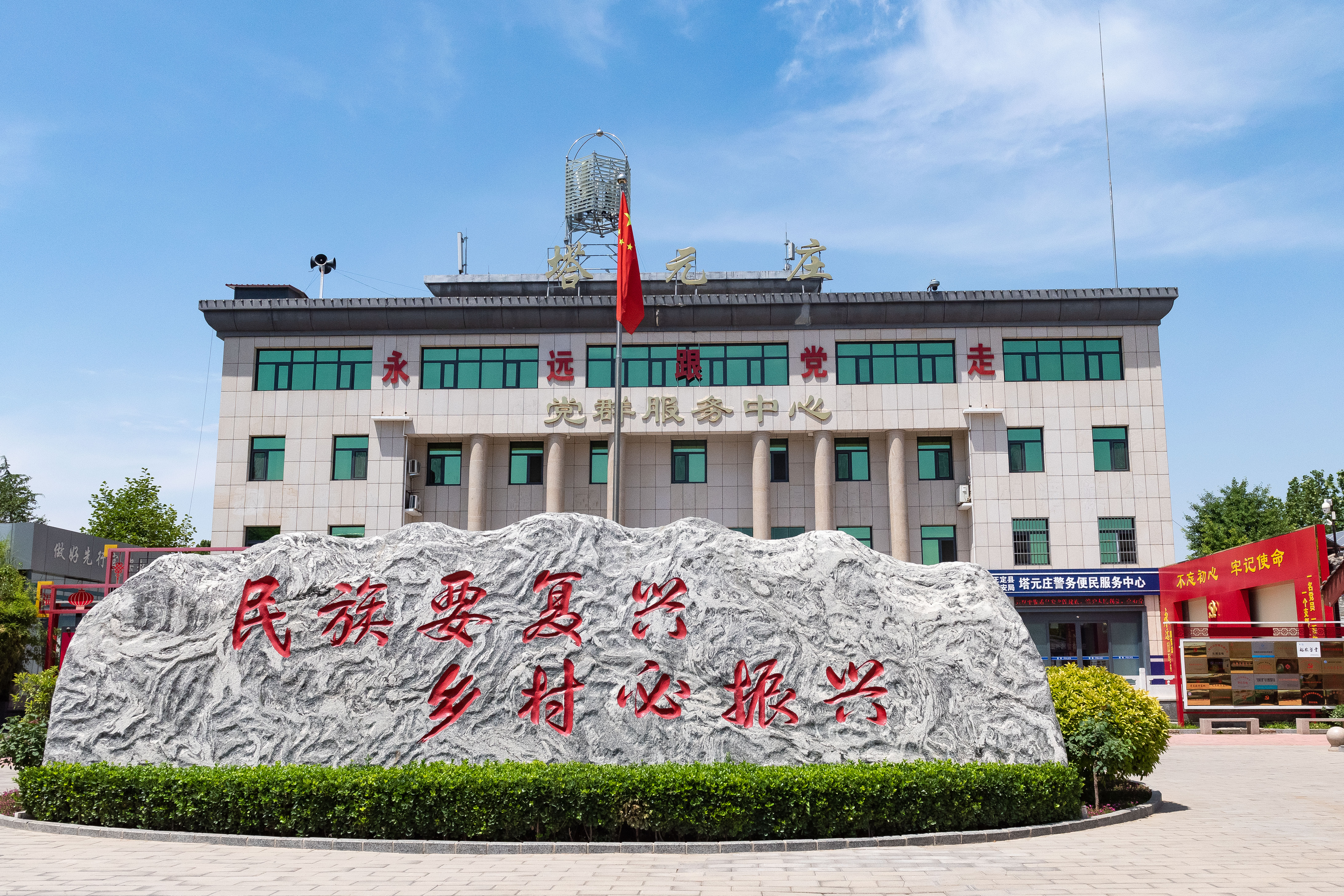
Tayuanzhuang Village Hall

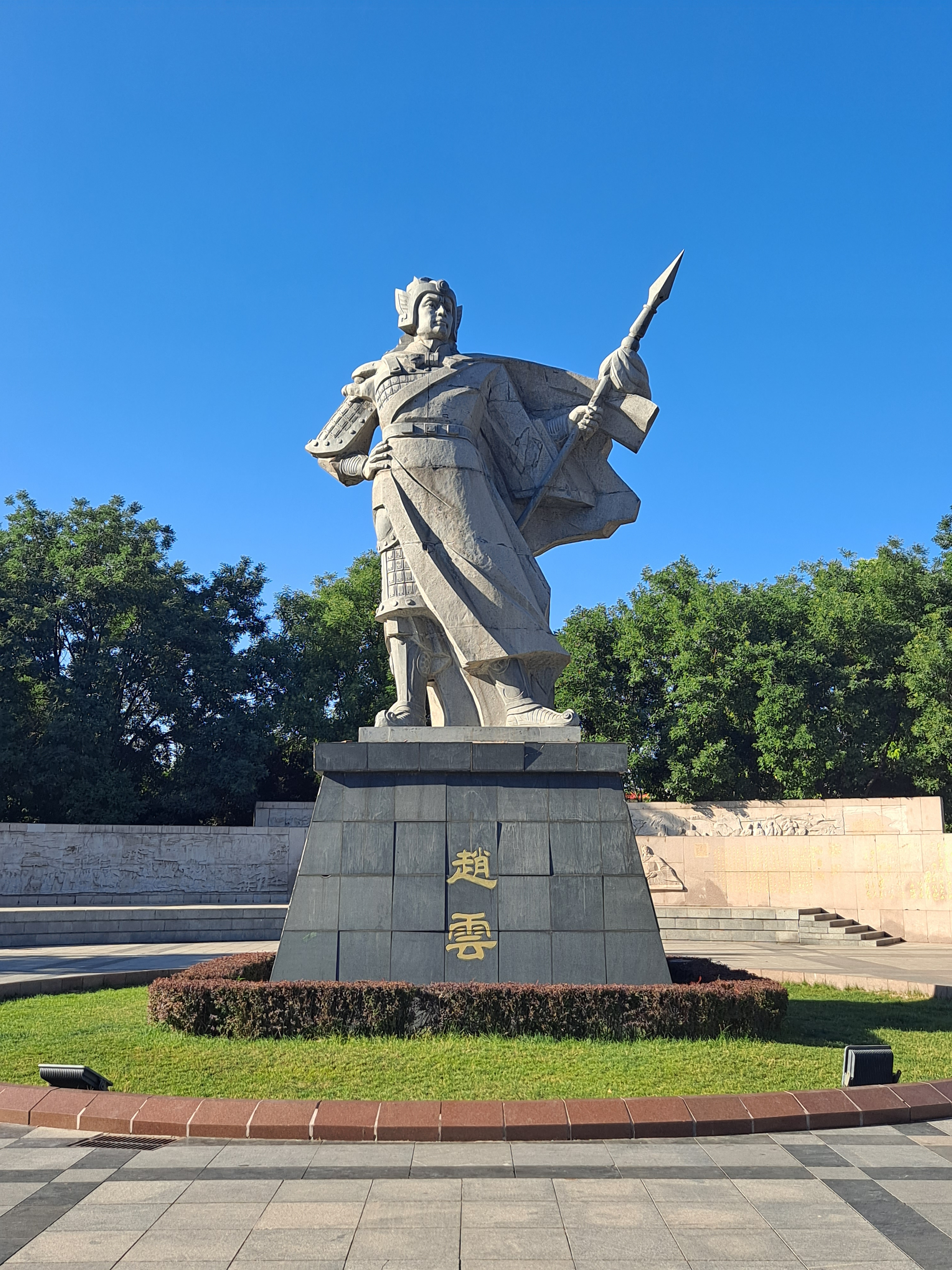
Statue of Zhao Yun

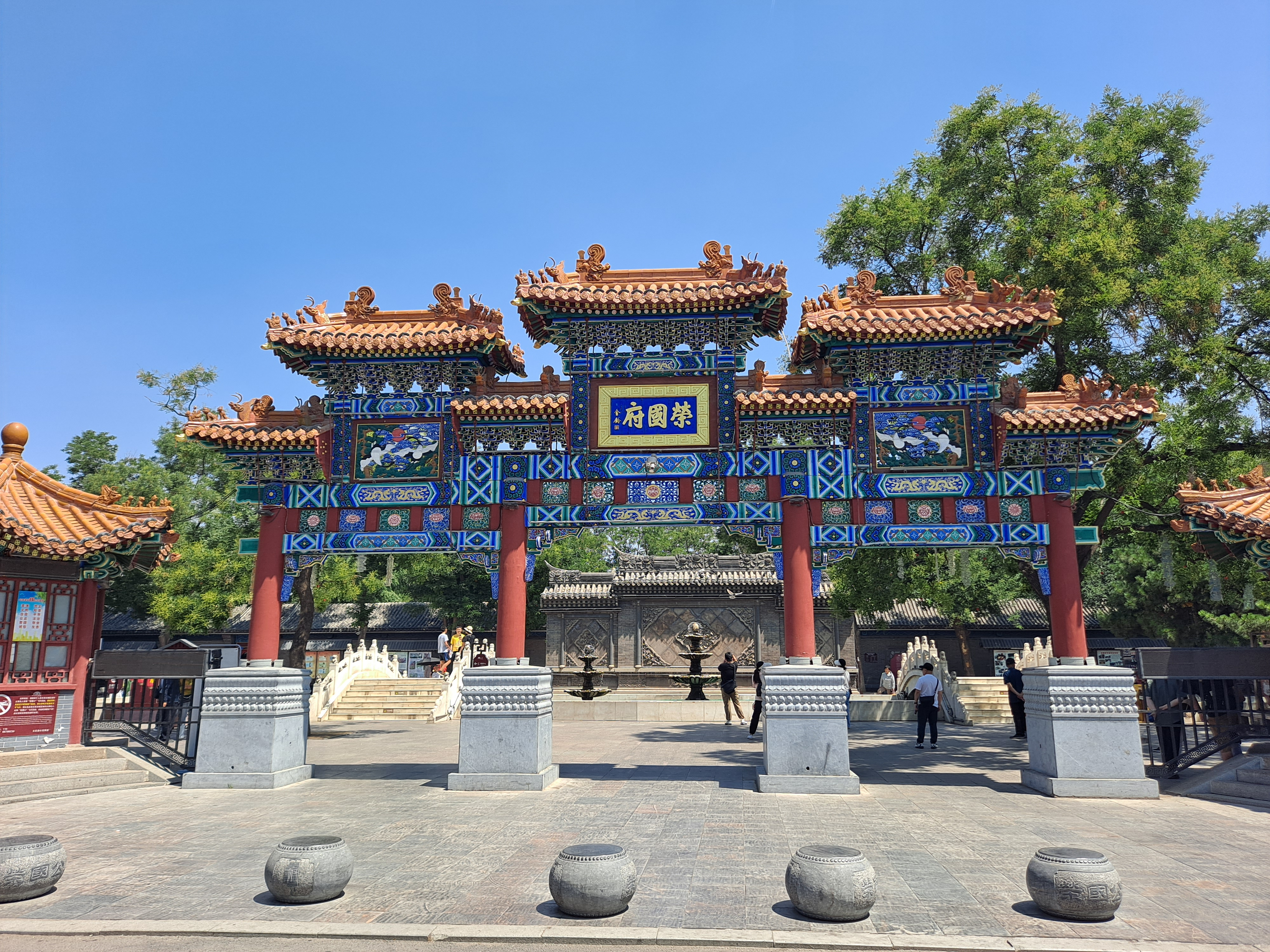
Rongguo Mansion

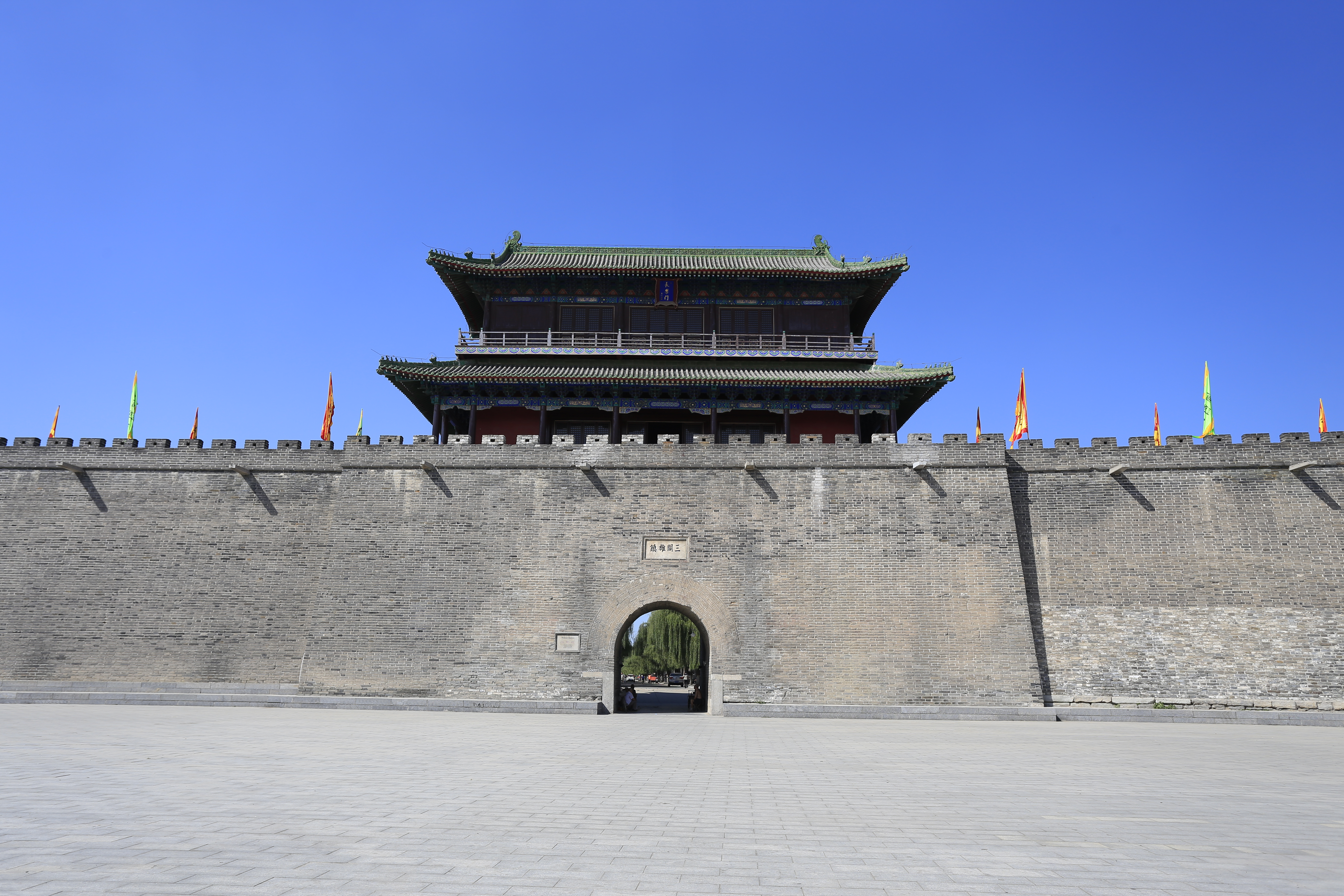
Zhengding City Wall

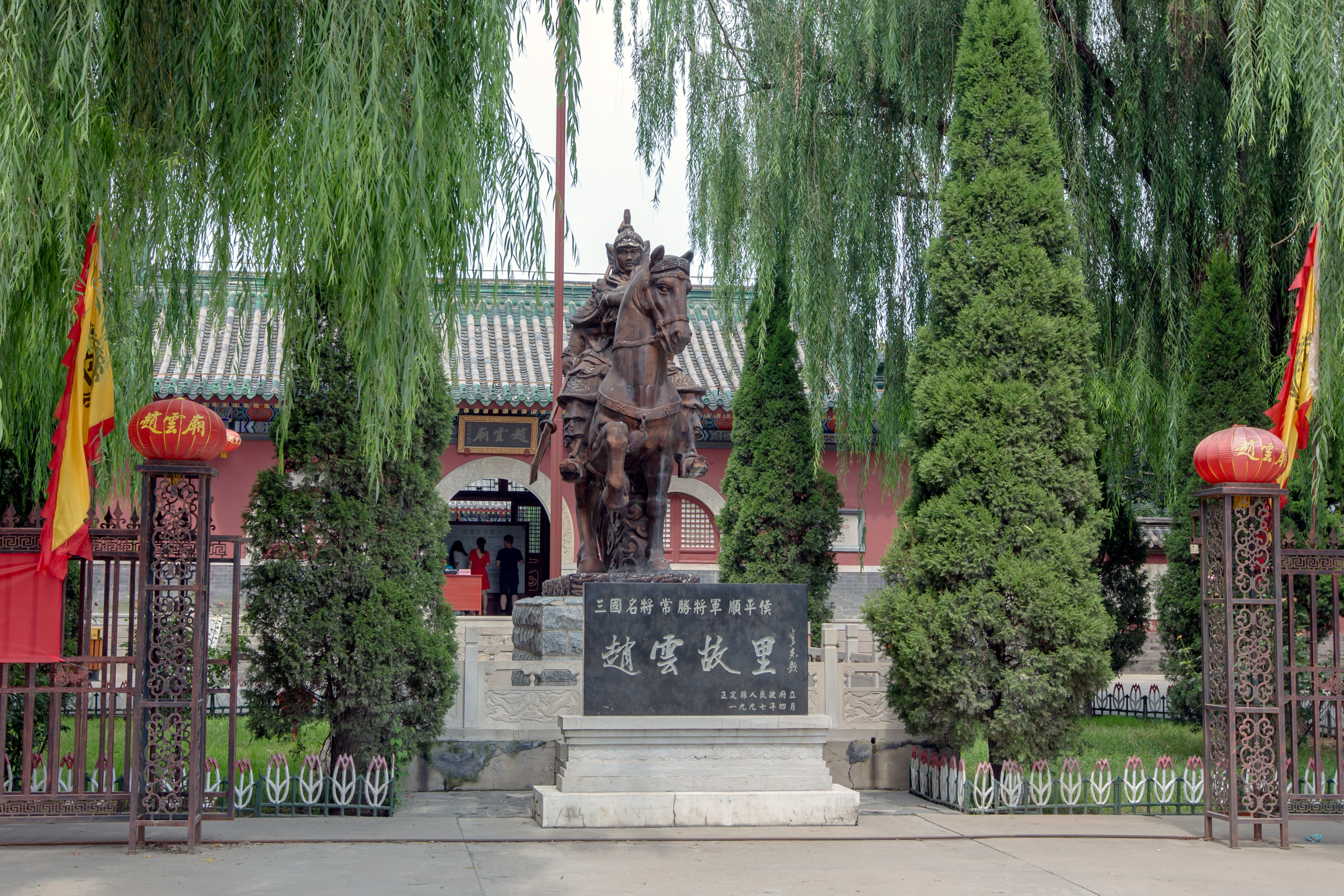
Temple of Zhao Yun
