= Zhengding Airport railway station =

Railway station in Hebei Province, China

Zhengding Airport 正定机场
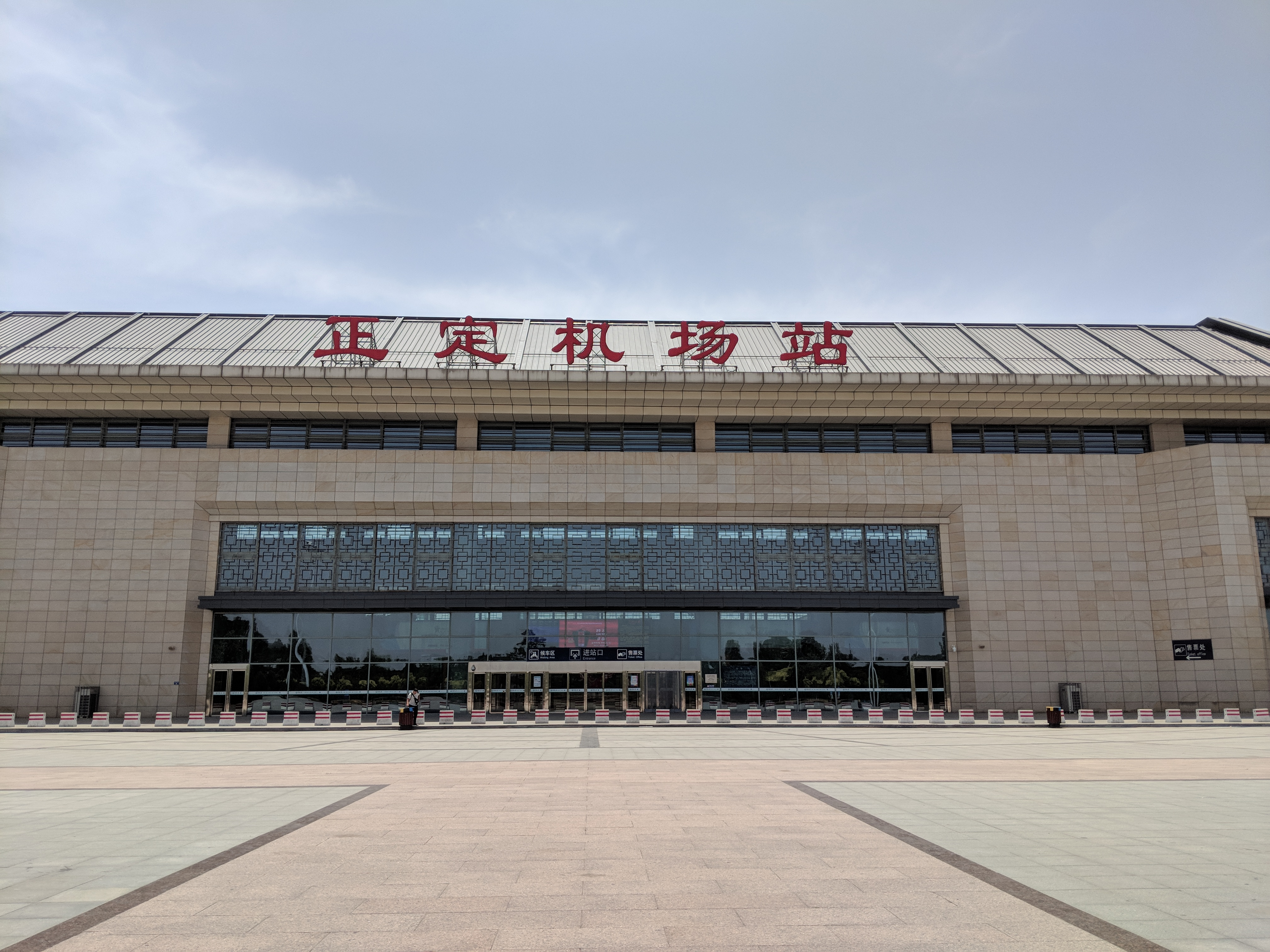

General information
- Location: Zhengding County, Shijiazhuang, Hebei; China
- Coordinates: 38°15′2″N 114°42′10″E
- Operator: CR Beijing
- Line: Beijing–Shijiazhuang high-speed railway
- Platforms: 2
- Tracks: 4
- Connections: Bus terminal

Other information
- Status: Operational
- Station code: 22519 (TMIS code); ZHP (telegraph code); ZDC (Pinyin code)
- Classification: 3rd class station

History
- Opened: December 26, 2012

Services
Preceding station	China Railway High-speed	Following station
Dingzhou East towards Beijing West	Beijing–Shijiazhuang high-speed railway	Shijiazhuang Terminus
Location
- Location within Hebei

The Zhengding Airport railway station (simplified Chinese: 正定机场站; traditional Chinese: 正定機場站; pinyin: Zhèngdìng Jīchǎng Zhàn) is a station on the Beijing–Guangzhou–Shenzhen–Hong Kong high-speed railway. It is located in Xinchengpu Town in Zhengding County, Shijiazhuang, Hebei Province, near Shijiazhuang Zhengding International Airport.

== History ==
The station was opened on 26 December 2012, together with the Beijing-Zhengzhou section of the Beijing–Guangzhou–Shenzhen–Hong Kong High-Speed Railway.

During the first three months of 2013, passengers flying to Shijiazhuang were provided with free train tickets to station such as Beijing West and Zhengzhou East. Passengers arriving to the airport by train and leaving by plane could have the cost of their train tickets reimbursed as well. Over 150,000 passengers used the promotion in 2013.

== Location ==
Although named after the Shijiazhuang Zhengding International Airport, the station is not adjacent to the airport. It is located about 3 kilometres (1.9 mi) southeast to the airport and is connected to the airport's main passenger terminals with a dedicated 3.78 km (2.35 mi) long expressway. Shuttle bus services are provided to connect the station with the airport, with a 3–5 min trip.

It takes under 15 minutes for a D- or G-series trains to travel from the station to Shijiazhuang. The travelling time to Beijing is around 1 hour to 1 hour 30 min.

== Station layout ==
The station has 2 side platforms and 4 tracks. The Platform 1 (northern platform) is used by trains going towards the direction of Beijing West while the Platform 2 (southern platform) is used by trains towards the direction of Guangzhou South. The station building, which houses ticket offices, waiting halls, restaurants, etc., is located to the north of the platforms.

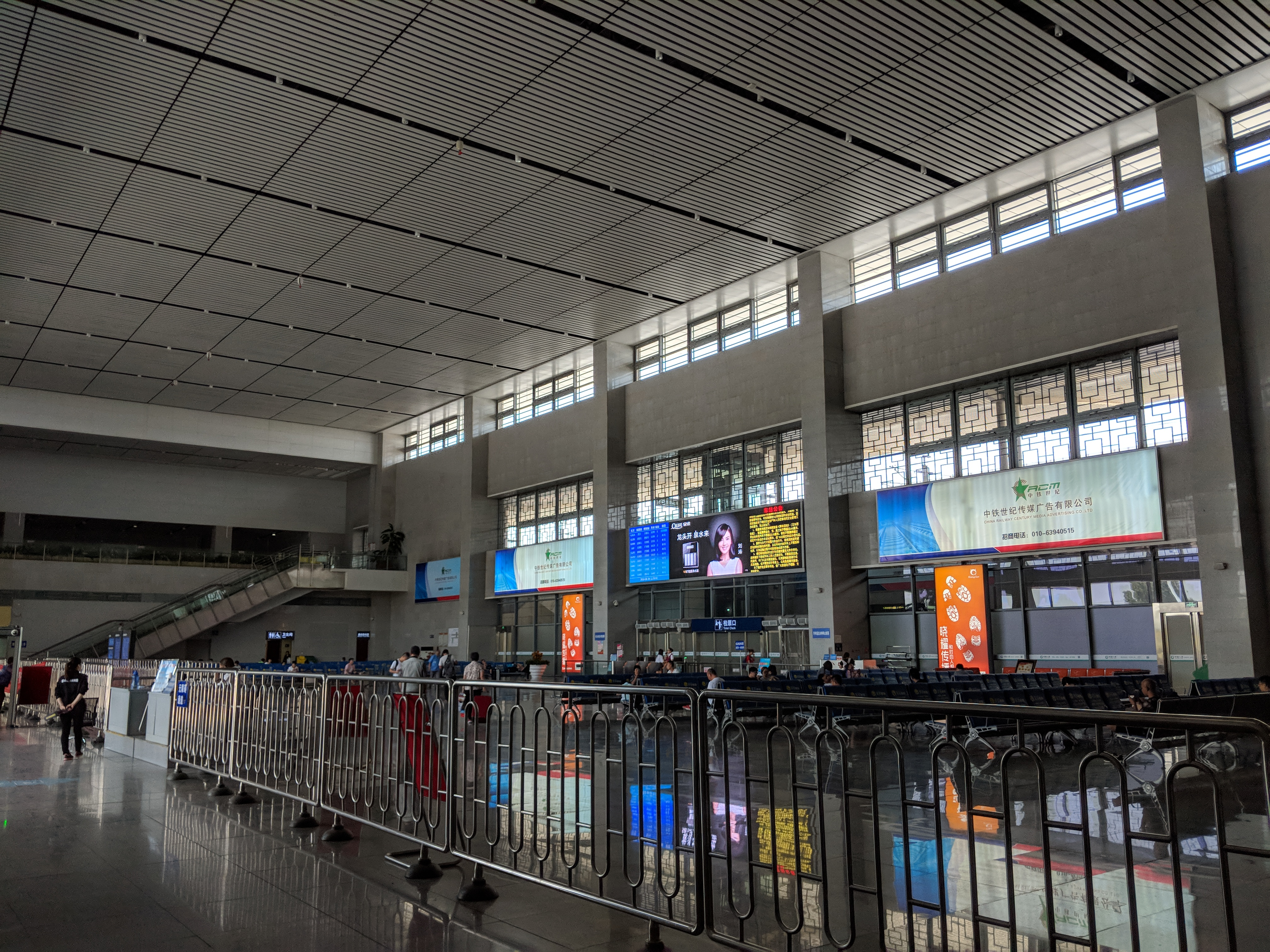
The entrance

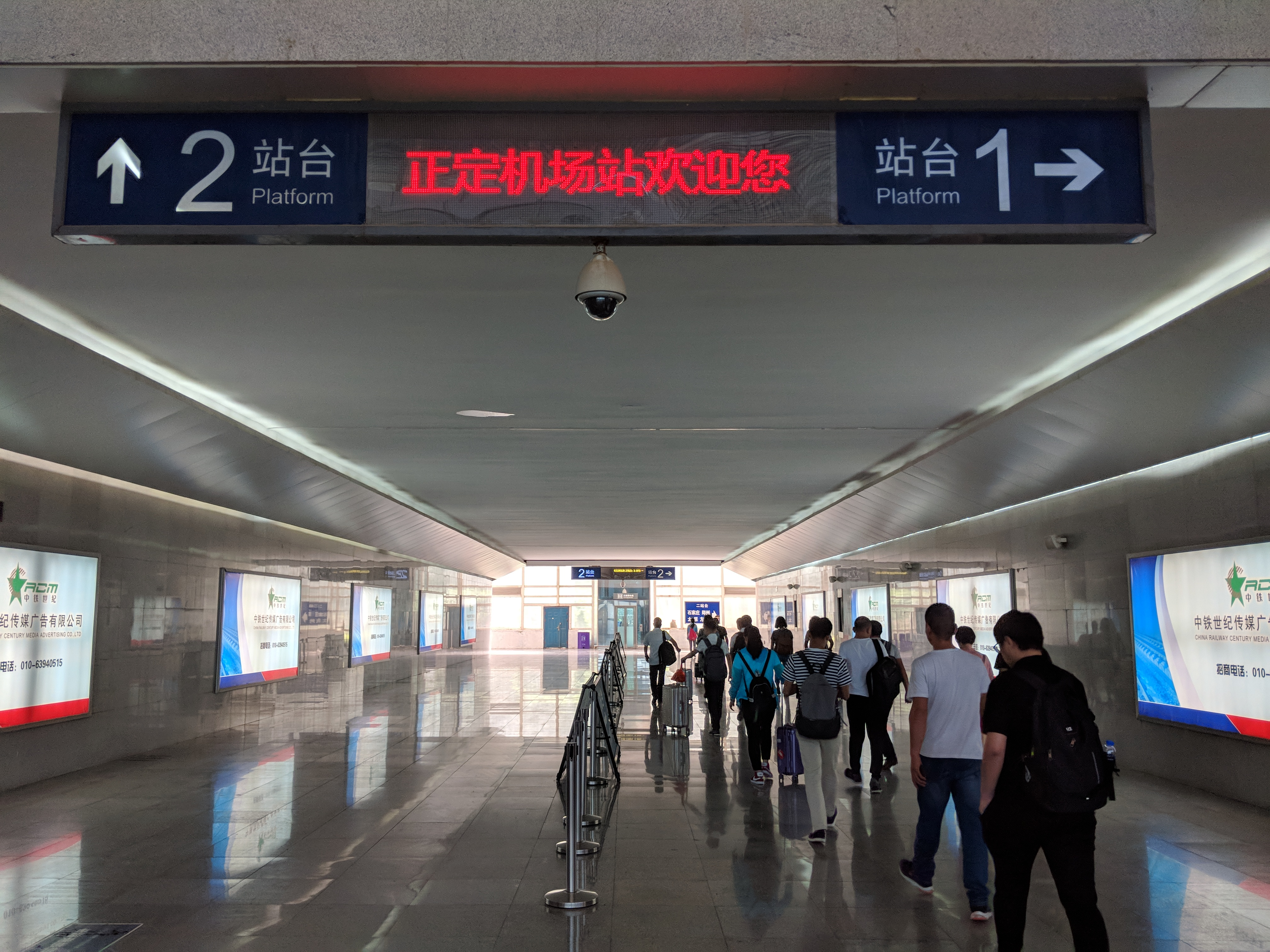
The tunnel

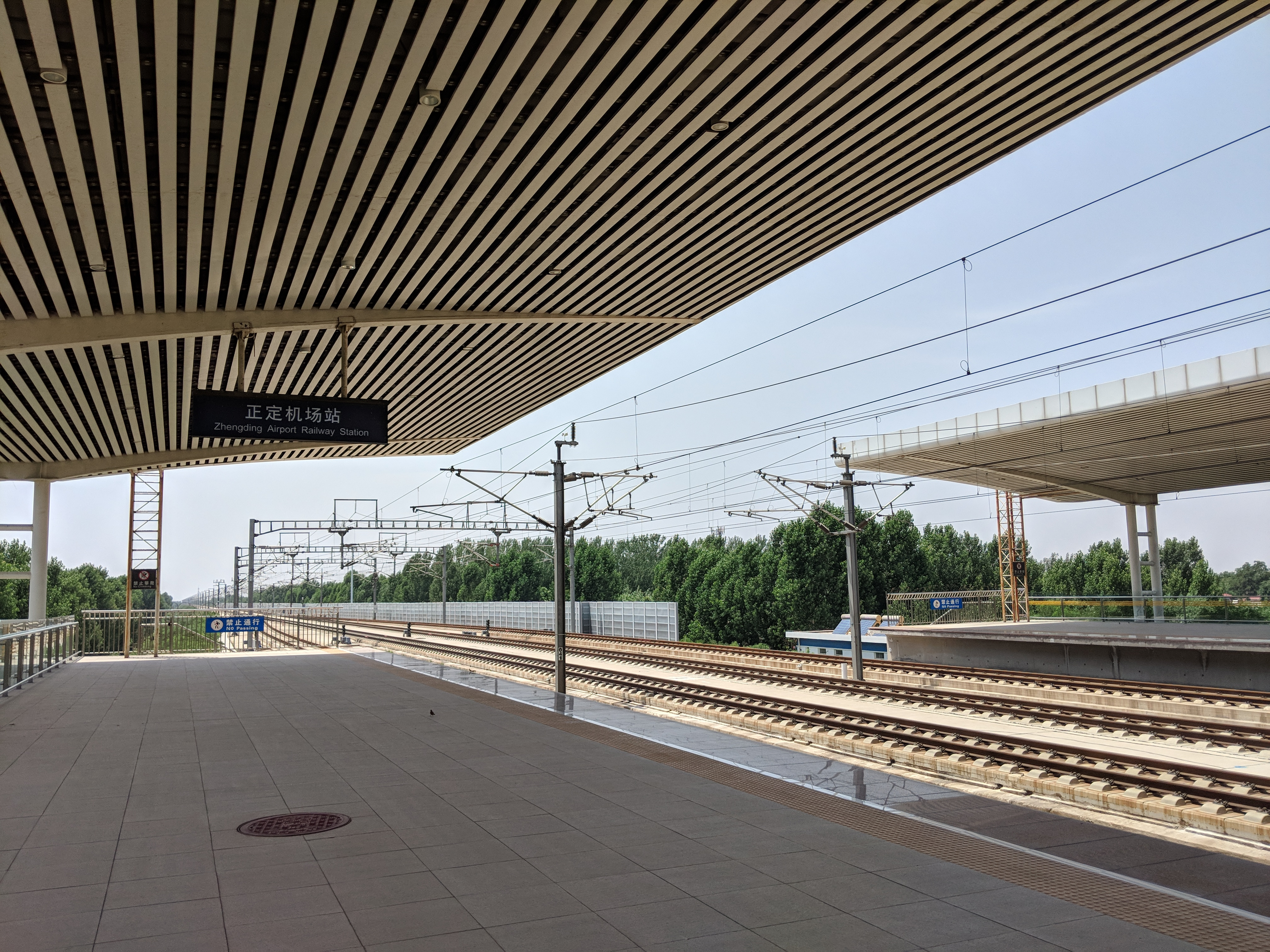
Platforms
