= Gaocheng Astronomical Observatory =

Coordinates: 34°24′10″N 113°08′27″E

UNESCO World Heritage Site
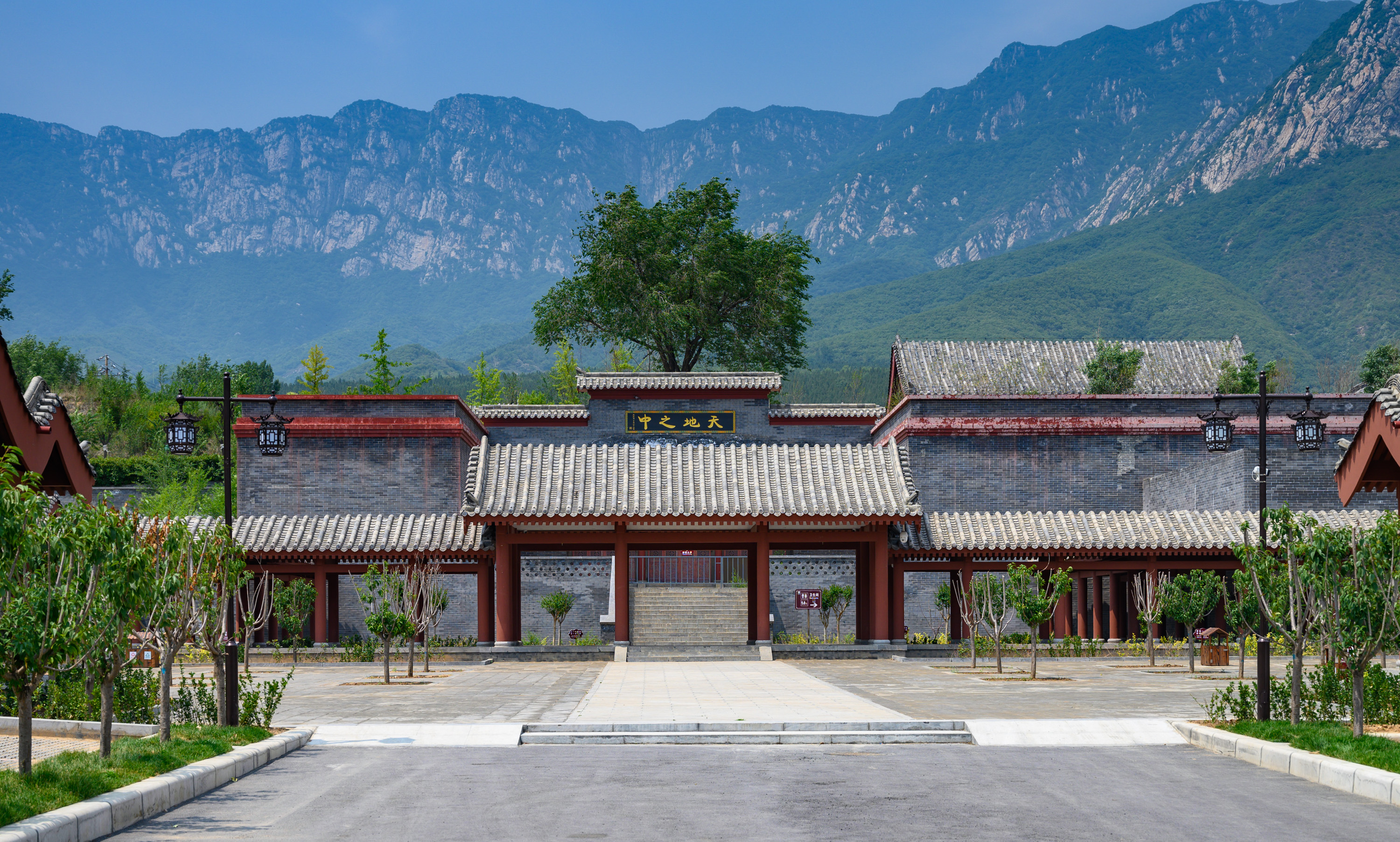
- Entrance of the Observatory, with Mount Taihang in the background
- Interactive map of Gaocheng Astronomical Observatory
- Official name: Historic Monuments of Dengfeng in "The Center of Heaven and Earth"
- Includes: 1. Taishi Que Gates, Zhongue Temple; 2. Shaoshi Que Gates; 3. Qimu Que Gates; 4. Songye Temple Pagoda; 5. Architectural Complex of Shaolin Temple; Kernel Compound; Chuzu Temple; Pagoda Forest; 6. Huishan Temple; 7. Songyang Academy of Classical Learning; 8. Observatory
- Criteria: Cultural: (iii)(vi)
- Reference: 1305rev
- Inscription: 2010 (34th Session)
- Area: 825 ha (2,040 acres)
- Buffer zone: 3,438.1 ha (8,496 acres)

Gaocheng Astronomical Observatory
- Simplified Chinese: 登封观星台
- Literal meaning: Gaocheng Astronomical Observatory
Transcriptions
Standard Mandarin
- Hanyu Pinyin: Dēngfēng guānxīngtái

Gaocheng Astronomical Observatory, also known as the Dengfeng Observatory, is an observatory in Duke of Zhou's shrine, Gaocheng Town, near Dengfeng in Henan province, China. This site has a long tradition of astronomical observations, from the time of the Western Zhou up to the early Yuan dynasty. There is also a gnomon used for the Da Yan calendar in 729 AD and the great observatory of the Yuan dynasty. As part of the "Historic Monuments of Dengfeng in the 'Center of Heaven and Earth'" the observatory was listed as a UNESCO World Heritage Site in 2010.

== History ==
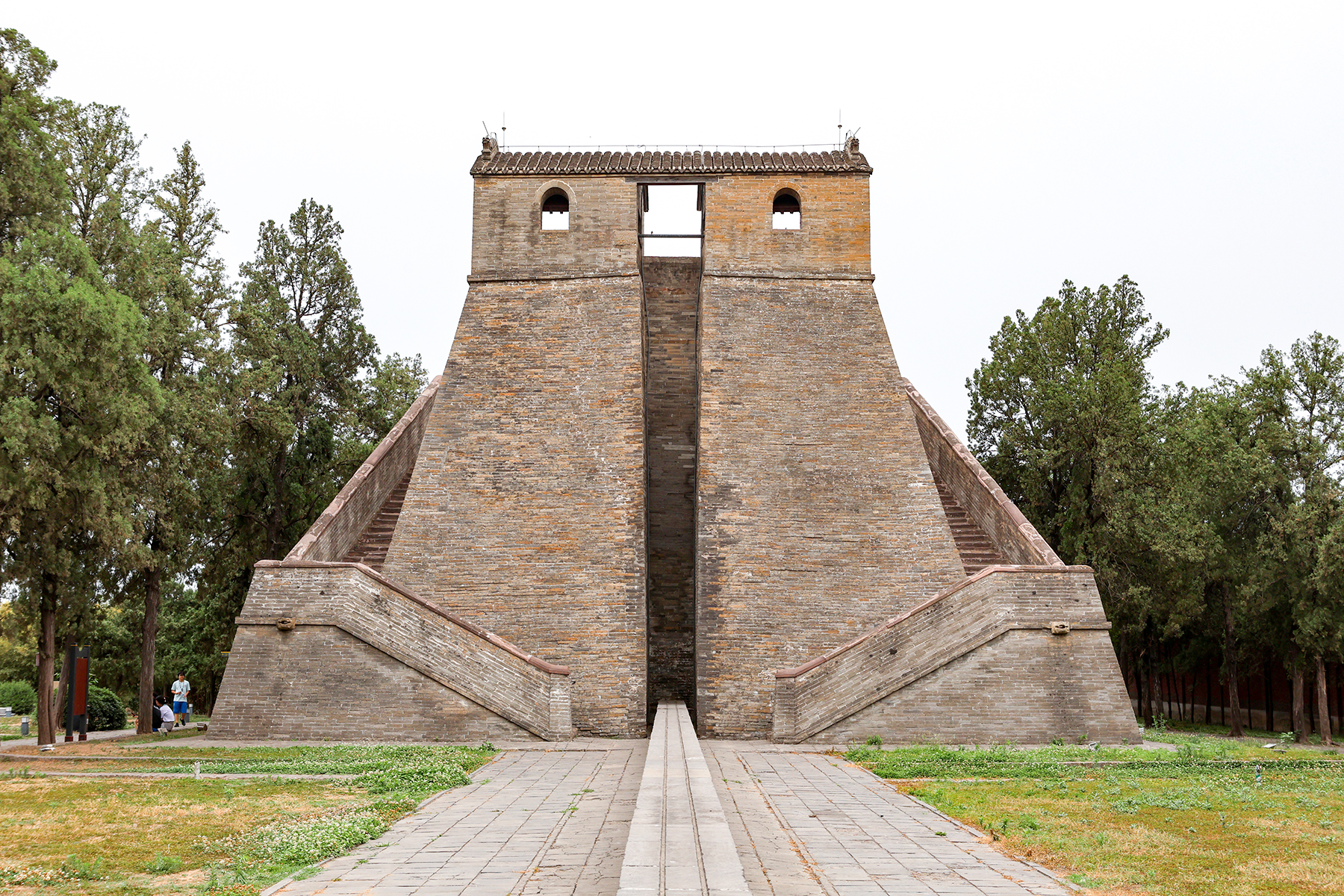
Gaocheng Astronomical Observatory. It was built in 1276.

=== Western Zhou ===
It is believed that the Duke of Zhou (c. 1042 BC) had erected at this place a Ceyingtai (observatory measuring the shade or gnomon) to observe the Sun, as he believed the area to be the centre of heaven and earth. His interest in mathematics, astronomy/astrology is reported in the Zhoubi Suanjing.

=== Tang dynasty ===
The astronomer Yi Xing (683–727) of the Tang dynasty built 20 standardized gnomons spread out over China to measure the equation of time dependent on the geographical location. Following a proposition of Liu Zhuo from 604 AD, 10 of these were aligned along the meridian 114° east of Greenwich from Central Asia down to Vietnam in order to determine the circumference of the Earth and deviations from a perfect sphere. One of these 10 observatories was situated at Gaocheng. The observations were used to establish the Da Yan calendar.

South of the observatory, in the temple dedicated to Zhou Gong can be found a Shigui chart made by Yi Xing. According to the Zhou Li (Rites of Zhou) this place is the center of the Earth.

=== Yuan dynasty ===
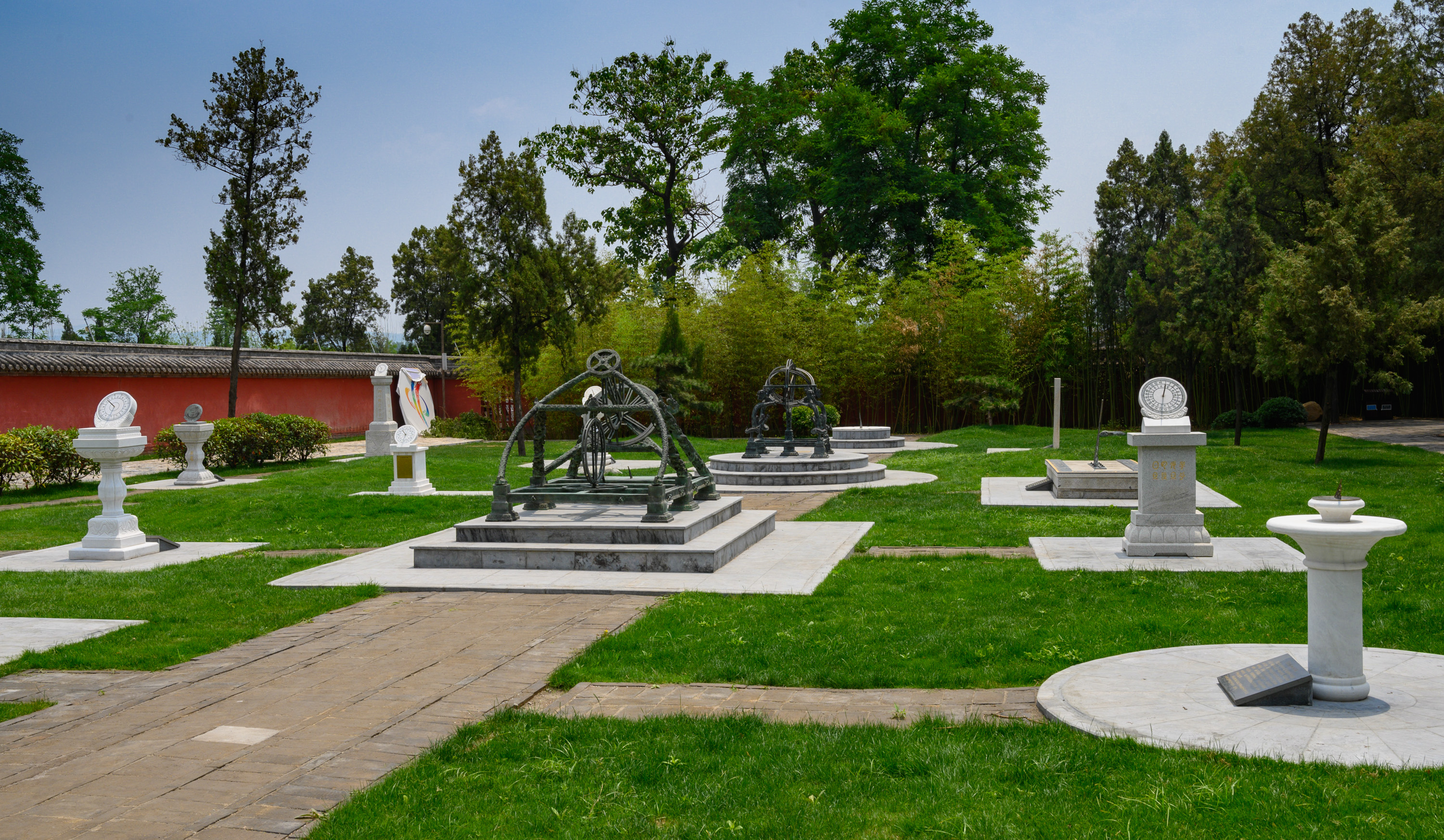
Instruments in the Observatory

The great observatory was built in 1276 in the early Yuan dynasty on the order of Kublai Khan and was designed by astronomers Guo Shoujing (1231–c.1315) and Wang Xun (1235–1281) to observe the movement of the sun and the stars and to record time.

It was built of stones and bricks. It has two parts: the body and shigui (also called the ruler to measure the sky). It is 9.46 meters high by itself, and 12.62 meters high if the 2 cabinets on the top are included. The somewhat unconventional gnomon is a bar mounted horizontally between the two cabinets. The shigui extending to the far north is 31.19 meters long and 0.53 meters wide. It is made up of 36 square stones with two parallel waterways on it to check its levelness. The location of shigui is in accordance with the direction we take today to measure the meridian. During measurement, a beam is put across the grooves. Jingfu (an instrument with many holes) on the waterways is used to measure the shadow, whose precision is within 2 millimeters. At winter solstice, the length of the shadow at noon is nearly as long as the shigui.

The very precise observations served for the new Shoushi calendar (Season-Granting Calendar) of 1281, which was in use for 364 years. It was by far the most advanced calendar for its time; the length of the tropical year was determined to 365 d 5 h 49 m 20 s, a value in accord with the value of the Gregorian Calendar, but obtained 300 years earlier.

In 1787, Laplace applied these measurements to check his calculations on the secular changes of the obliquity of the ecliptic and the eccentricity of the Earth's orbit.

It is the first in a series of 27 observatories built in the early Yuan dynasty.

== See also ==
- Taosi (Xiangfen, Shanxi), a late Longshan neolithic site suggested to contain an ancient observatory
- List of astronomical observatories
