= Dengfeng =

Dengfeng 登封市 Tengfeng
- County-level city
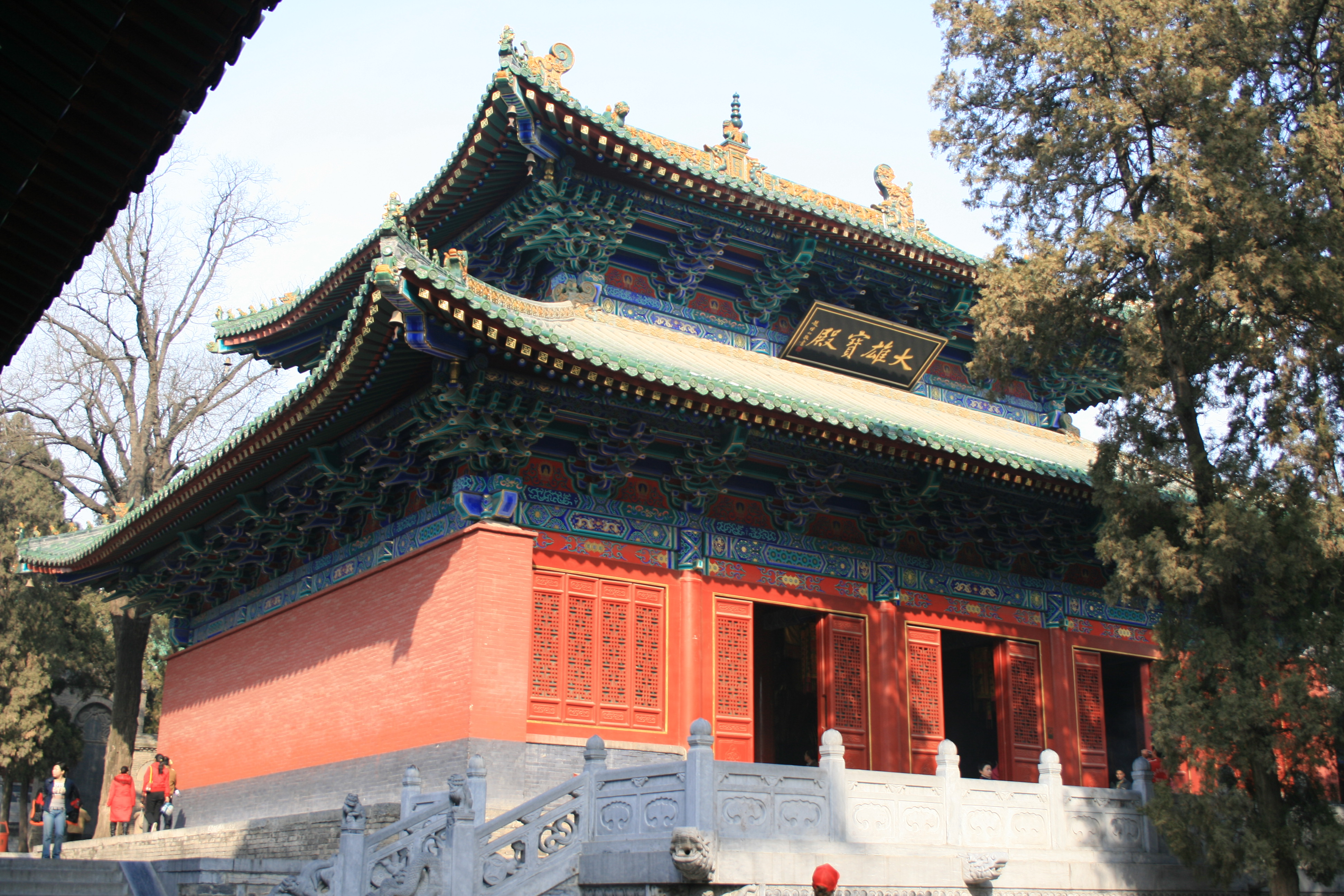
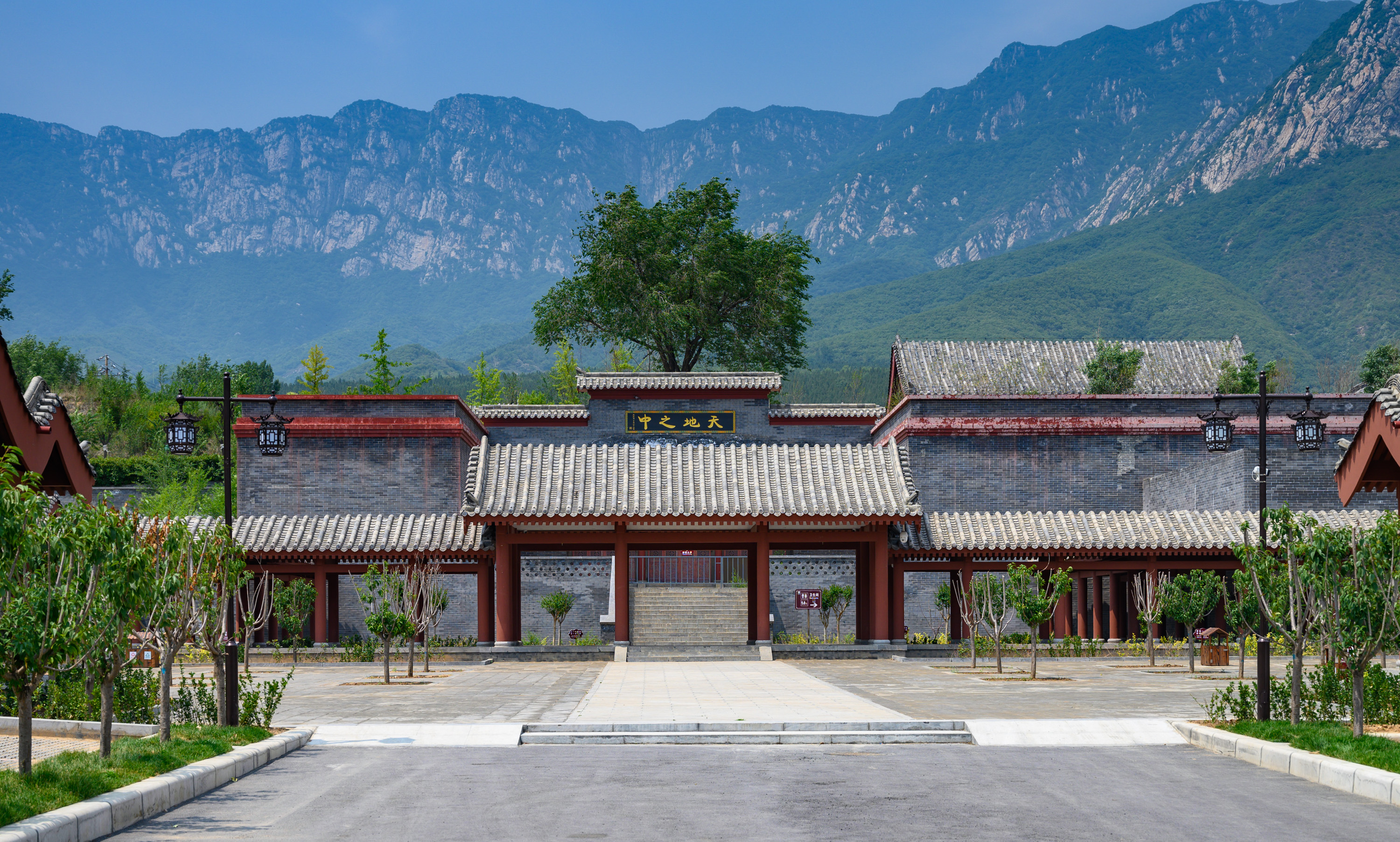
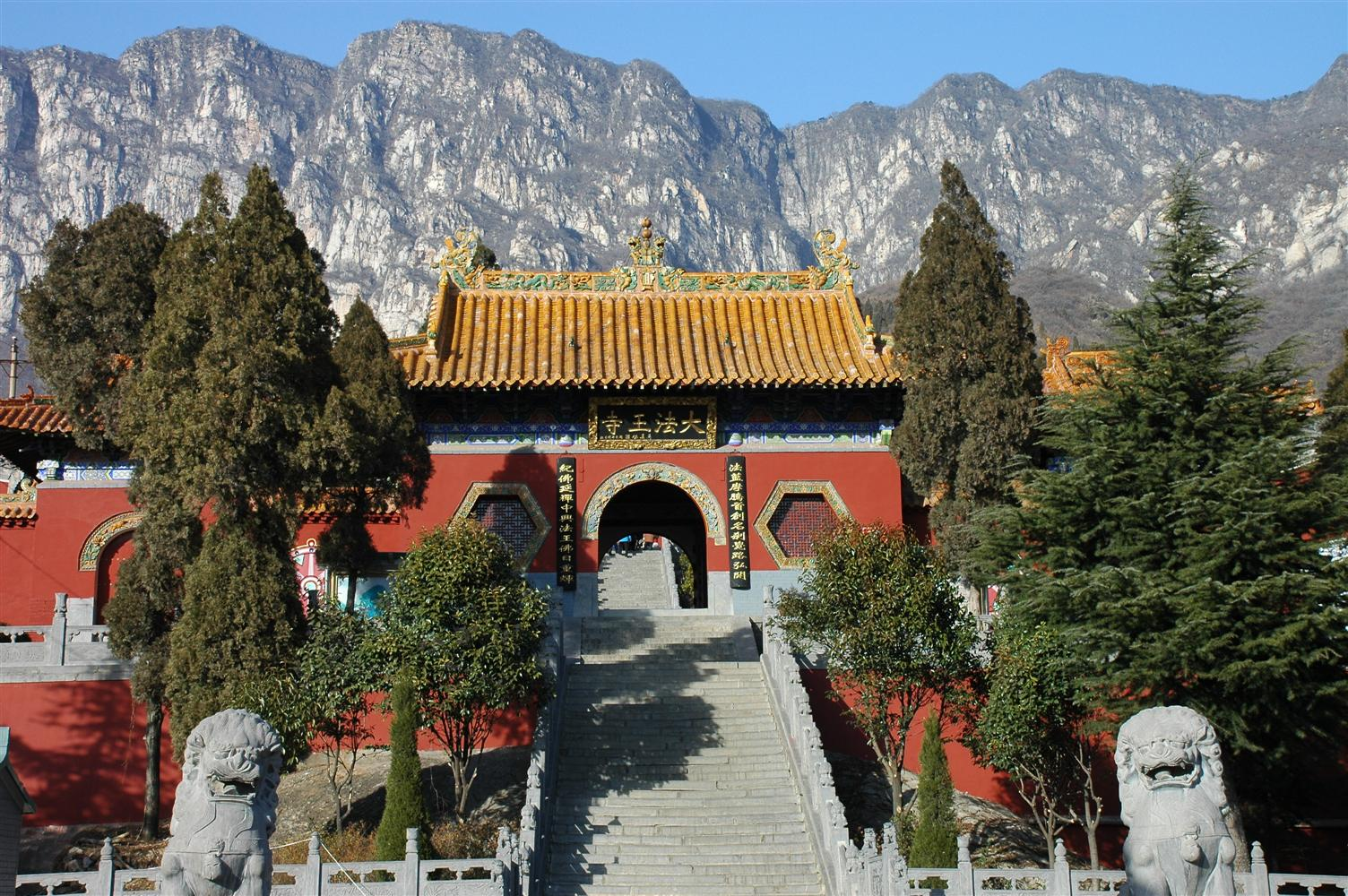
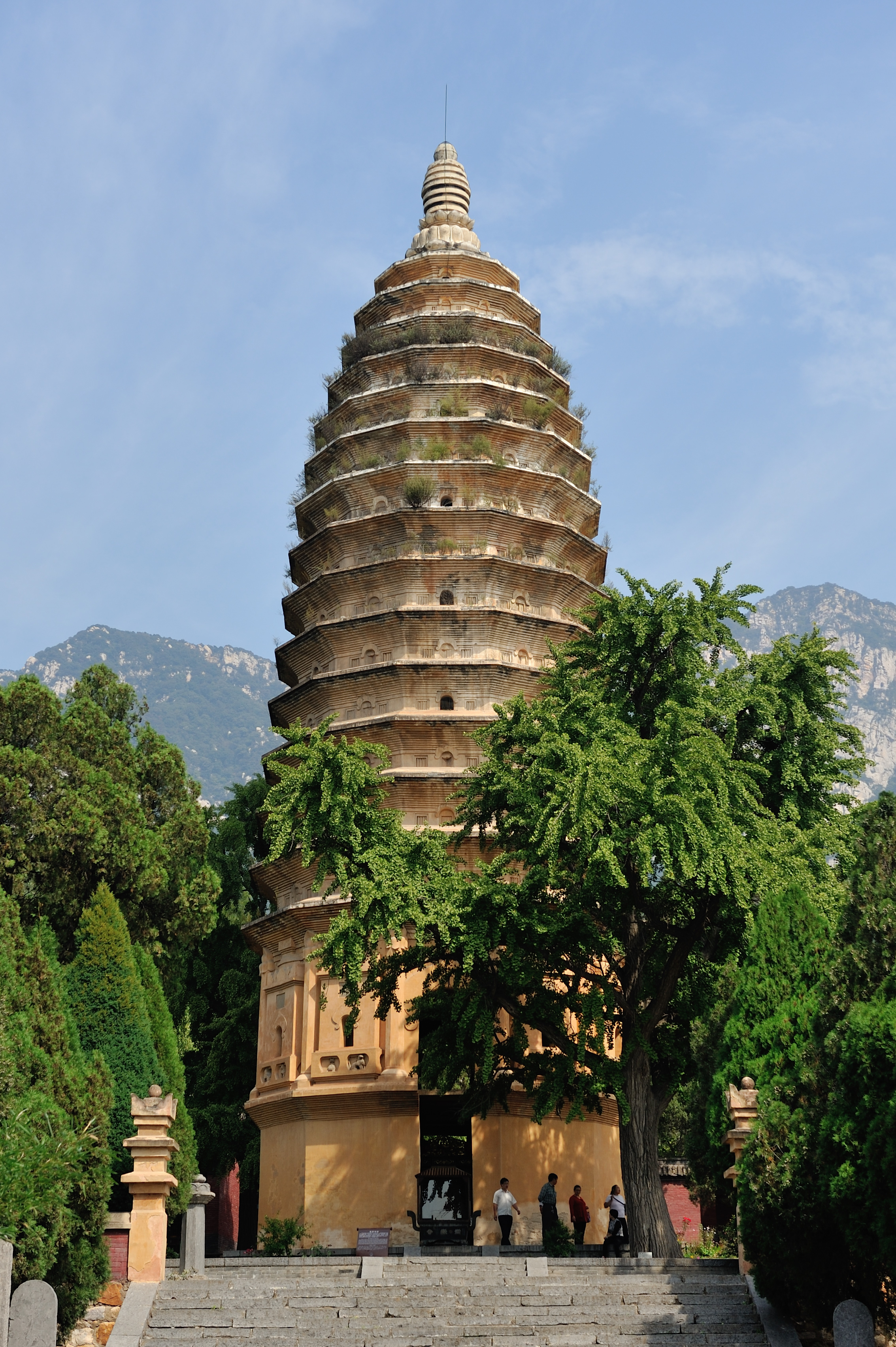
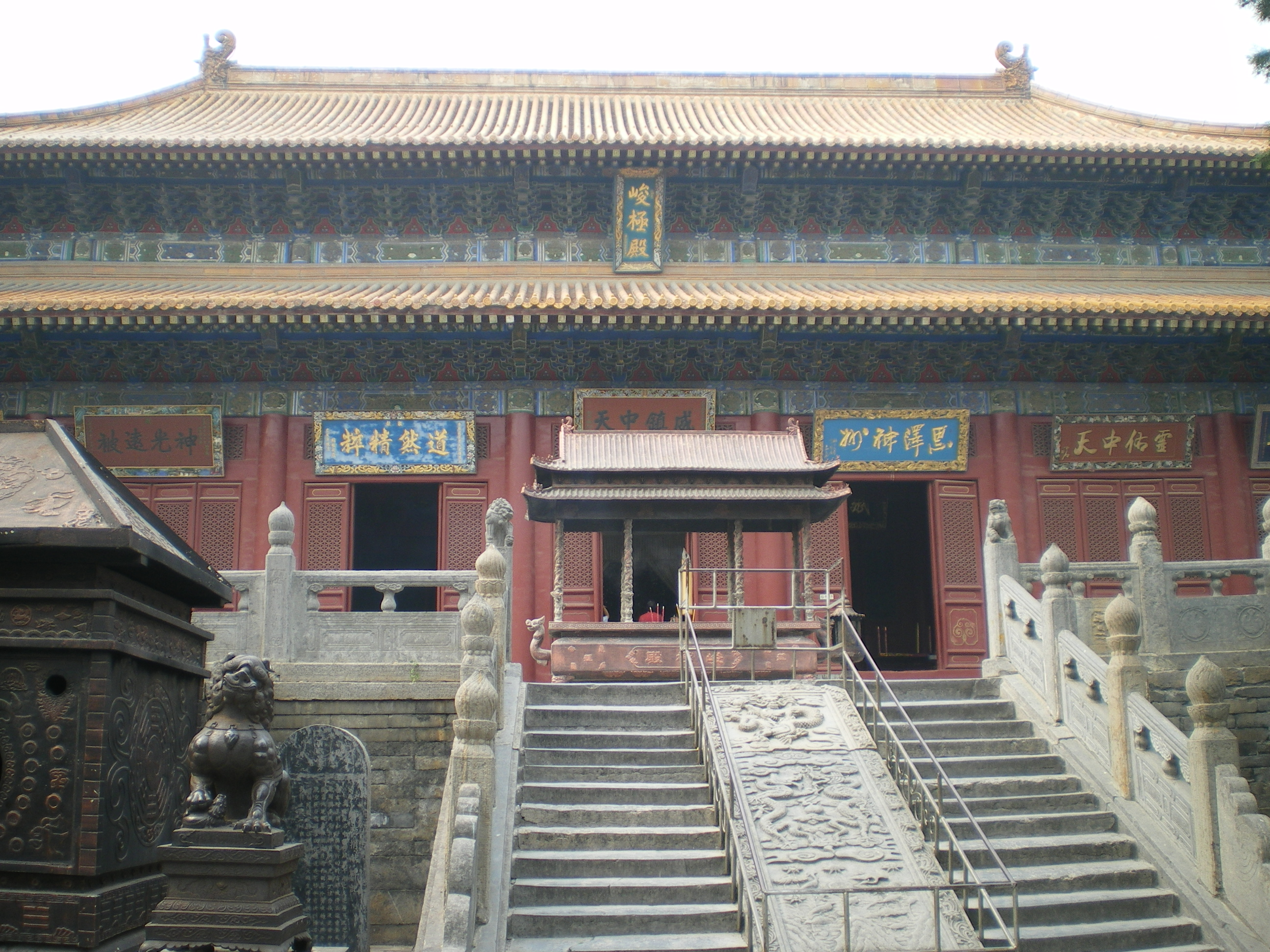
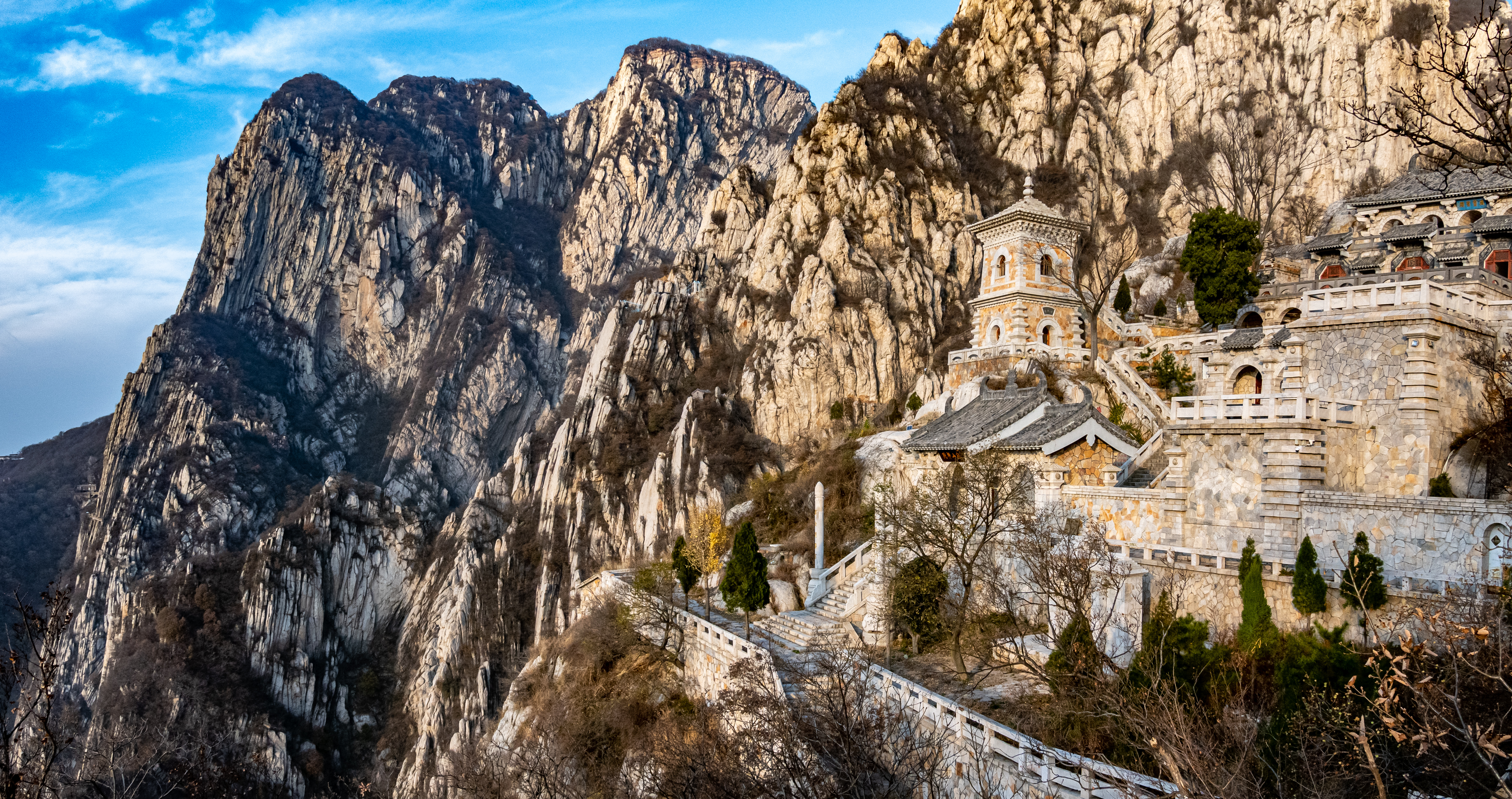
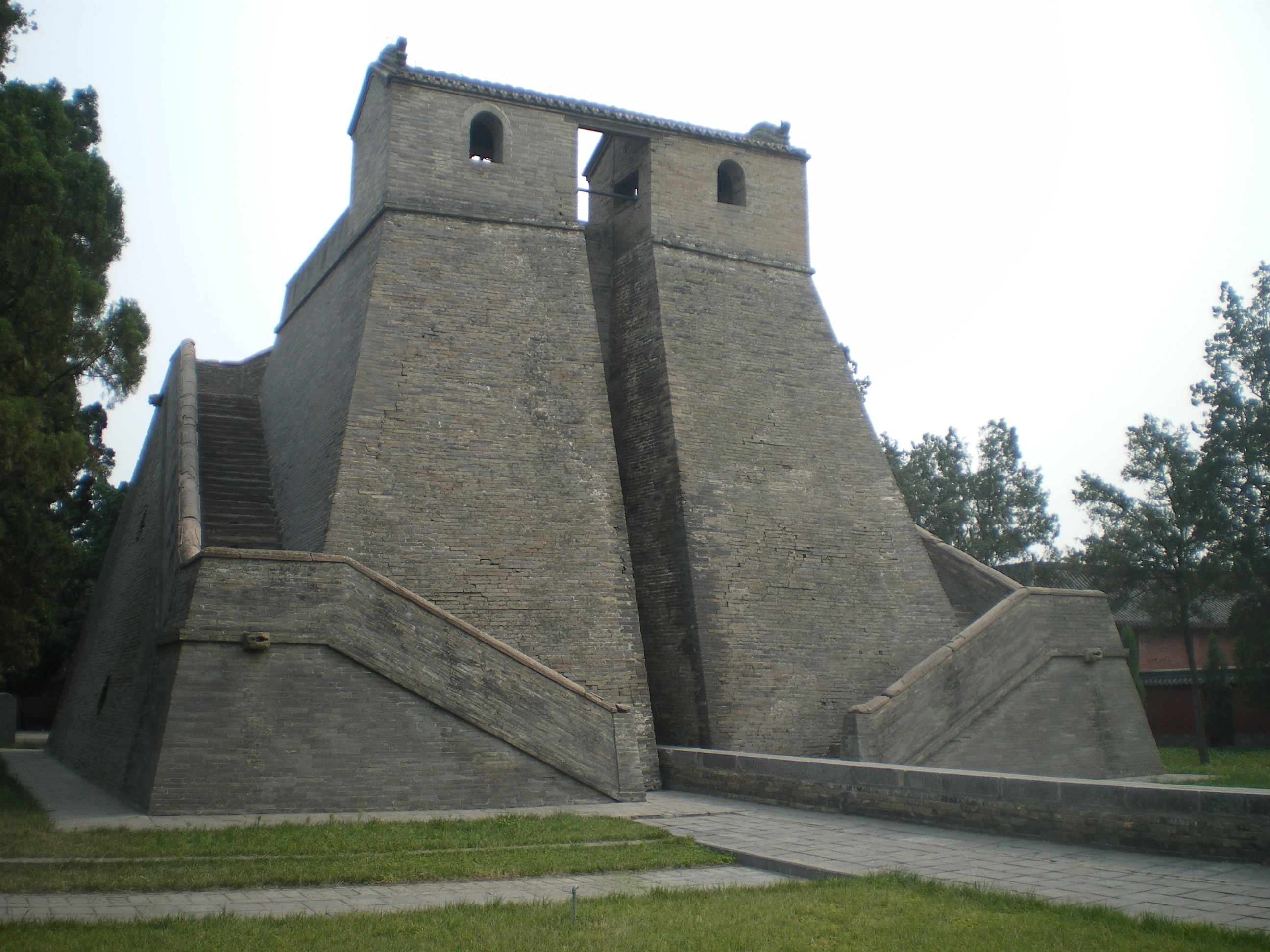
- Shaolin Monastery Gaocheng Astronomical Observatory Fawang Temple Songyue Pagoda Zhongyue Temple Mount Song Dengfeng Observatory

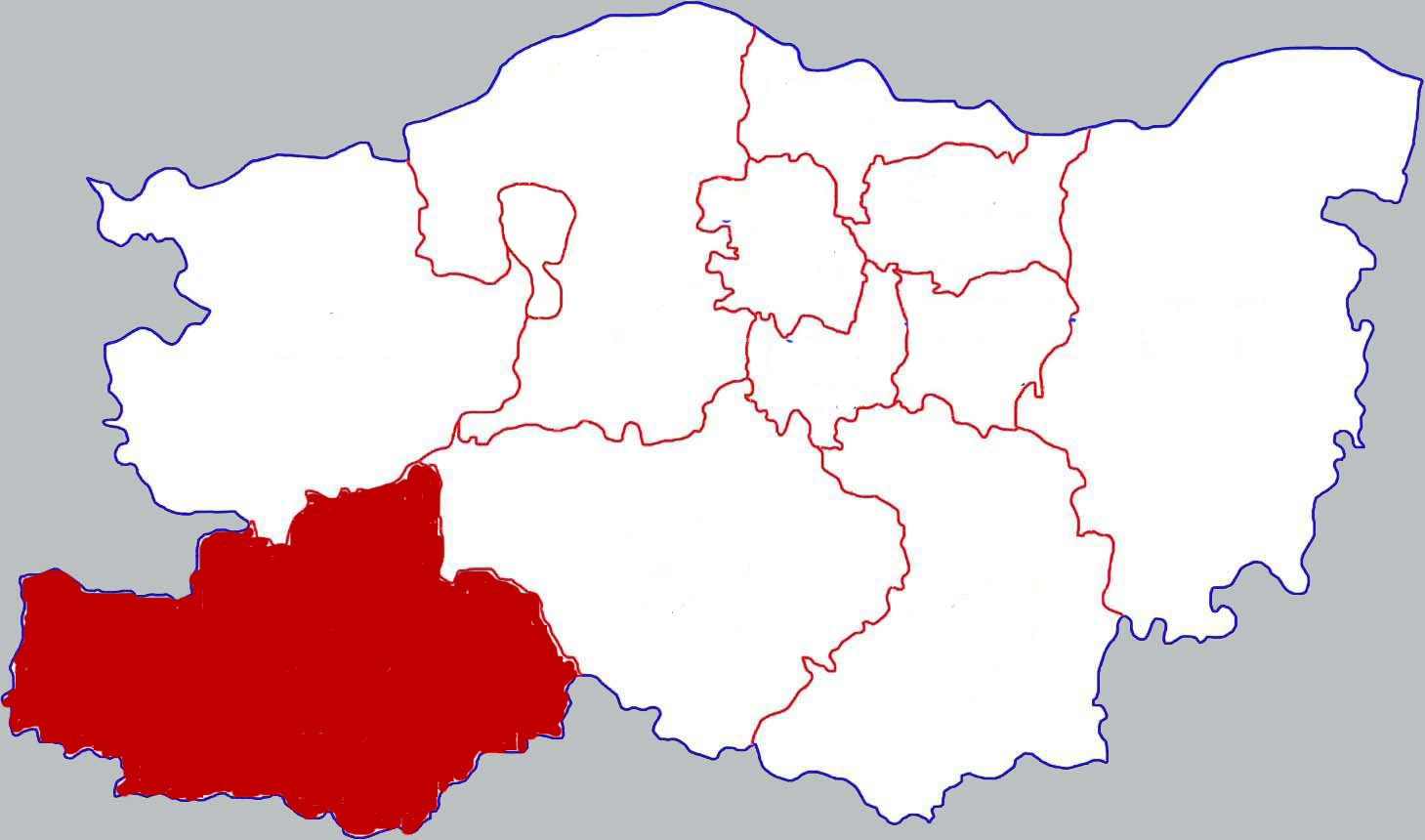
- Location in Zhengzhou

- Location in Henan
- Coordinates: 34°27′19″N 113°1′31″E
- Country: People's Republic of China
- Province: Henan
- Prefecture-level city: Zhengzhou

Area
  - Total: 1,220 km^{2} (470 sq mi)

Population (2019)
  - Total: 717,400
  - Density: 588/km^{2} (1,520/sq mi)
- Time zone: UTC+8 (China Standard)
- Postal code: 452470
- Website: www.dengfeng.gov.cn

UNESCO World Heritage Site
- Official name: Historic Monuments of Dengfeng in "The Center of Heaven and Earth"
- Includes: 1. Taishi Que Gates, Zhongue Temple; 2. Shaoshi Que Gates; 3. Qimu Que Gates; 4. Songye Temple Pagoda; 5. Architectural Complex of Shaolin Temple; Kernel Compound; Chuzu Temple; Pagoda Forest; 6. Huishan Temple; 7. Songyang Academy of Classical Learning; 8. Observatory
- Criteria: Cultural: (iii)(vi)
- Reference: 1305rev
- Inscription: 2010 (34th Session)
- Area: 825 ha (2,040 acres)
- Buffer zone: 3,438.1 ha (8,496 acres)

Dengfeng (Chinese: 登封; pinyin: Dēngfēng; postal: Tengfeng) is a county-level city of Henan Province, China. It is under the administration of the prefecture-level city of Zhengzhou. The name Dengfeng was bestowed upon it by Empress Wu Zetian of the Wu Zhou dynasty. Located in the central-west part of Henan Province, at the southern foot of Songshan Mountain, it borders the provincial capital Zhengzhou to the northeast and the ancient capital Luoyang to the northwest.

Dengfeng has an area of 1,220 km^{2} (470 sq mi) and a population of 630,000. It occupies the southwestern corner of Zhengzhou and is its westernmost county-level division.

Dengfeng is located at the foot of the Mount Song, one of the most sacred mountains in China. The city is one of the most renowned spiritual centers of China, and is home to various religious institutions and famous temples such as the Taoist Zhongyue Temple, the Buddhist Shaolin Temple (a renowned center for martial arts), as well as the Confucian Songyang Academy and the Gaocheng Observatory, hence its poetic expression derived from Chinese literature as the spiritual "center of heaven and earth".Parts of the city were inscribed on the UNESCO World Heritage List in 2010.

== History ==
The first Xia dynasty capital, Yangcheng, was built west of Gaocheng Township on the Ying River under the sacred Mount Song.

The famous Shaolin Monastery, traditionally considered the origin of Zen, is located in Dengfeng where they teach adults as well as children martial arts. It is also a famous tourist attraction.

== Administrative divisions ==
As of 2012, the city is divided to 3 subdistricts, 8 towns and 5 townships.

Subdistricts

- Songyang Subdistrict (嵩阳街道)
- Shaolin Subdistrict (少林街道)
- Zhongyue Subdistrict (中岳街道)

Towns

- Dajindian (大金店镇)
- Yingyang (颖阳镇)
- Ludian (卢店镇)
- Gaocheng (告成镇)
- Yangchengqu (阳城区镇)
- Daye (大冶镇)
- Xuanhua (宣化镇)
- Xuzhuang (徐庄镇)

Townships

- Dongjindian Township (东金店乡)
- Baiping Township (白坪乡)
- Junzhao Township (君召乡)
- Shidao Township (石道乡)
- Tangzhuang Township (唐庄乡)

== UNESCO World Heritage Site ==
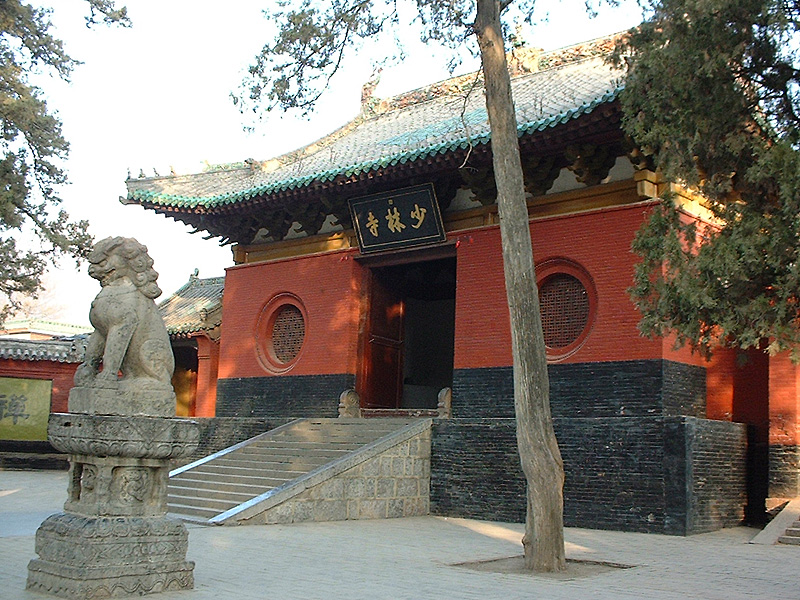
Shaolin Temple

In 2010, UNESCO inscribed several of the most renowned sites of Dengfeng onto its World Heritage List under the title "Historic Monuments of Dengfeng in 'The Center of Heaven and Earth'." The World Heritage Site includes several historic gates, temples, a Confucian academy and the Gaocheng Observatory:

- Taishi Que (太室闕) Gates: Gates built in front of what would become the Zhongyue Temple in 118 AD, with carved reliefs of animals, trees, and spirits.
- Zhongyue Temple: A Taoist temple constructed in the 5th century, during Kou Qianzhi's reforms. Includes Juni Hall, a large hall for sacrificing to the gods, two stone statues built in 118 AD that are the oldest surviving stone statues in China.
- Shaoshi Que Gates: Han dynasty gates (dating to 123 AD), with pictures of horses galloping, a circus, and cuju, and ancient football game.
- Qimu Que Gates: A pair of gates built in 123 AD, with images that depict scenes of cockfights, floods, and visitation by the Roman Empire
- Songyue Temple Pagoda: Built between 508 and 511, it had very innovative architecture and became a template for many future pagodas.
- Shaolin Monastery and its Pagoda Forest: A complex of temples and over 240 pagodas, built over 1300 years starting in the 5th century. A major sacred site for Buddhism.
- Huishan Temple: A wooden temple built in the 12th century on the site of the astronomer Yi Xing's residence.
- Songyang Academy: Created in the Tang dynasty, it was considered one of the four greatest academies of classical learning in China. Contributed to the dissemination of Confucianism across China.
- Gaocheng Astronomical Observatory: an observatory built in the 13th century to accurately measure the world and create precise calendars.

Other notable sites in Dengfeng include the Fawang Temple, a Buddhist temple built in the Tang dynasty.

== Climate ==
Climate data for Dengfeng, elevation 427 m (1,401 ft), (1991–2020 normals, extremes 1981–present)
Month	Jan	Feb	Mar	Apr	May	Jun	Jul	Aug	Sep	Oct	Nov	Dec	Year
Record high °C (°F)	18.8 (65.8)	21.8 (71.2)	31.8 (89.2)	38.5 (101.3)	38.0 (100.4)	40.1 (104.2)	39.4 (102.9)	37.0 (98.6)	37.6 (99.7)	31.2 (88.2)	27.4 (81.3)	21.4 (70.5)	40.1 (104.2)
Mean daily maximum °C (°F)	5.6 (42.1)	9.1 (48.4)	14.8 (58.6)	21.7 (71.1)	26.8 (80.2)	30.7 (87.3)	31.1 (88.0)	29.7 (85.5)	25.7 (78.3)	20.6 (69.1)	13.7 (56.7)	7.7 (45.9)	19.8 (67.6)
Daily mean °C (°F)	1.1 (34.0)	4.1 (39.4)	9.5 (49.1)	16.1 (61.0)	21.5 (70.7)	25.6 (78.1)	26.6 (79.9)	25.3 (77.5)	21.1 (70.0)	15.8 (60.4)	9.0 (48.2)	3.2 (37.8)	14.9 (58.8)
Mean daily minimum °C (°F)	−2.5 (27.5)	0.2 (32.4)	5.0 (41.0)	10.9 (51.6)	16.3 (61.3)	20.6 (69.1)	22.8 (73.0)	21.6 (70.9)	17.1 (62.8)	11.7 (53.1)	5.2 (41.4)	−0.3 (31.5)	10.7 (51.3)
Record low °C (°F)	−9.9 (14.2)	−10.1 (13.8)	−5.4 (22.3)	−0.2 (31.6)	7.2 (45.0)	12.8 (55.0)	17.4 (63.3)	11.3 (52.3)	9.8 (49.6)	0.6 (33.1)	−4.3 (24.3)	−9.3 (15.3)	−10.1 (13.8)
Average precipitation mm (inches)	9.5 (0.37)	11.5 (0.45)	19.8 (0.78)	35.9 (1.41)	57.2 (2.25)	65.6 (2.58)	133.1 (5.24)	102.1 (4.02)	69.6 (2.74)	38.5 (1.52)	24.8 (0.98)	7.4 (0.29)	575 (22.63)
Average precipitation days (≥ 0.1 mm)	4.1	4.2	5.7	6.1	7.5	8.2	11.8	11.0	9.0	6.8	5.3	3.6	83.3
Average snowy days	5.0	4.1	2.2	0.3	0	0	0	0	0	0	1.5	3.6	16.7
Average relative humidity (%)	50	53	52	53	54	58	72	74	67	59	56	49	58
Mean monthly sunshine hours	140.0	143.5	178.8	207.2	219.6	207.1	181.7	177.9	159.4	166.0	151.0	151.5	2,083.7
Percentage possible sunshine	45	46	48	53	51	48	42	43	43	48	49	50	47
Source: China Meteorological Administration

== Transportation ==
- China National Highway 207
- Dengfeng Tourist Railway

== Gallery ==
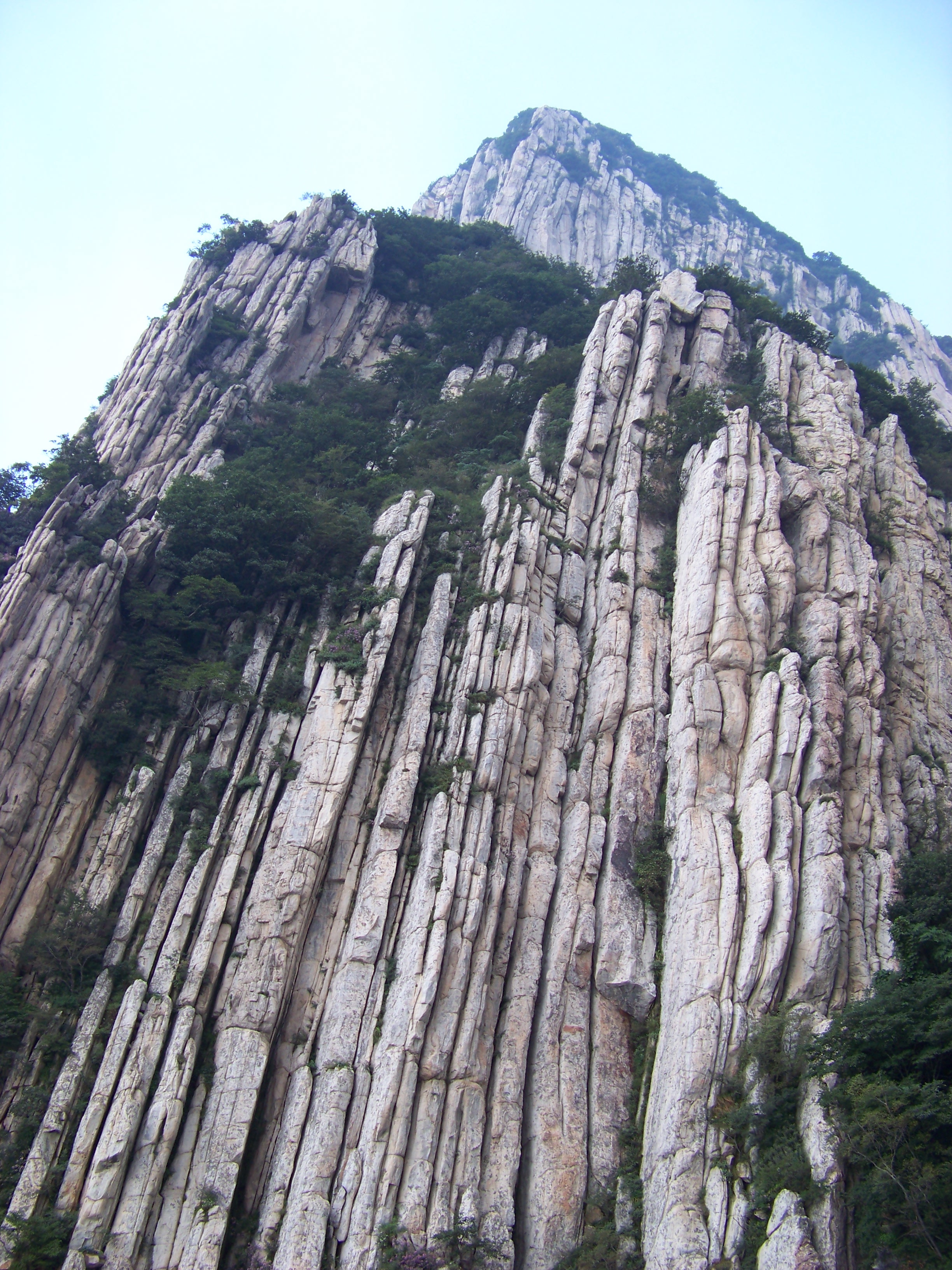
Mt. Shaoshi

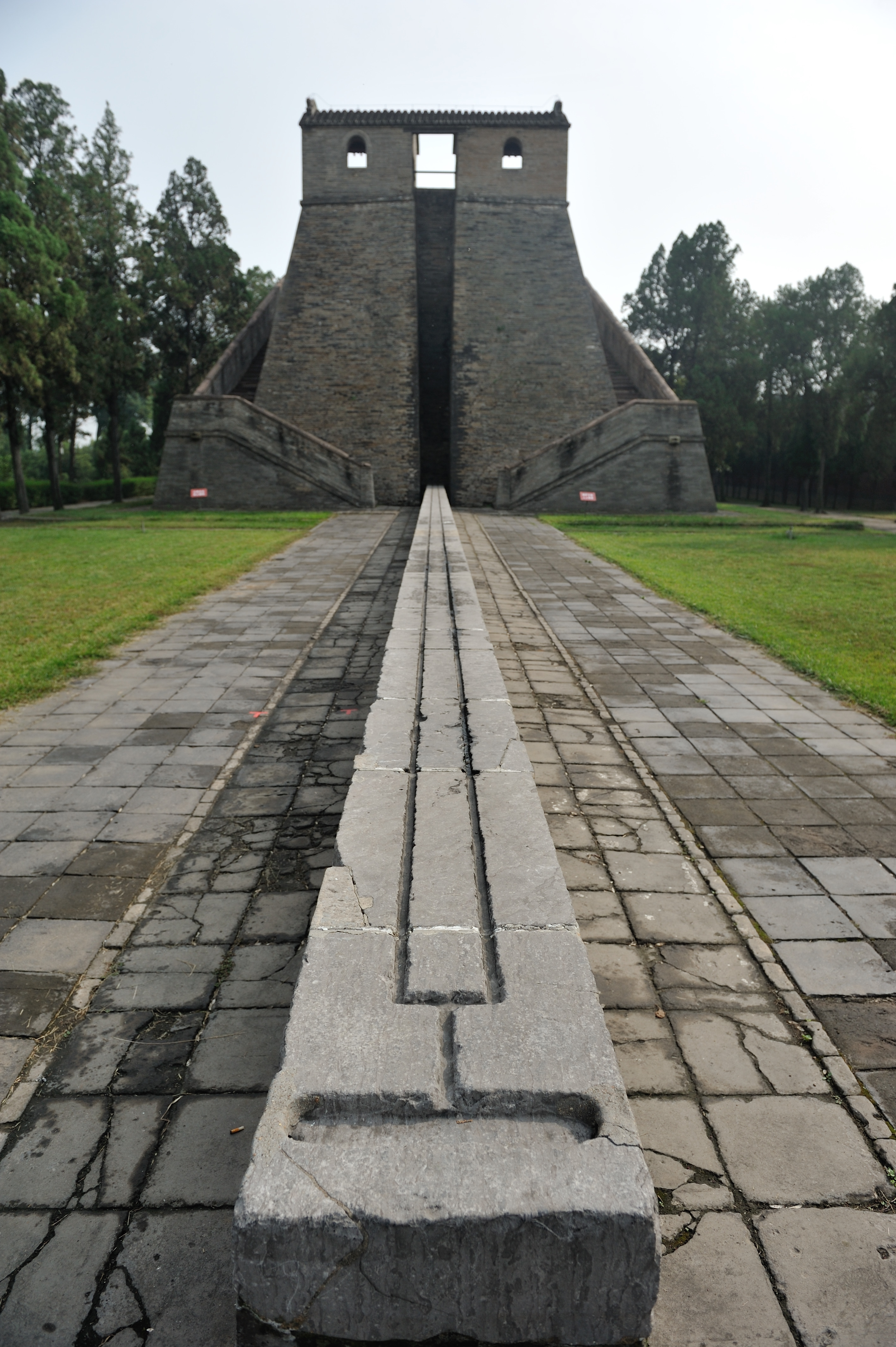
Gaocheng Observatory

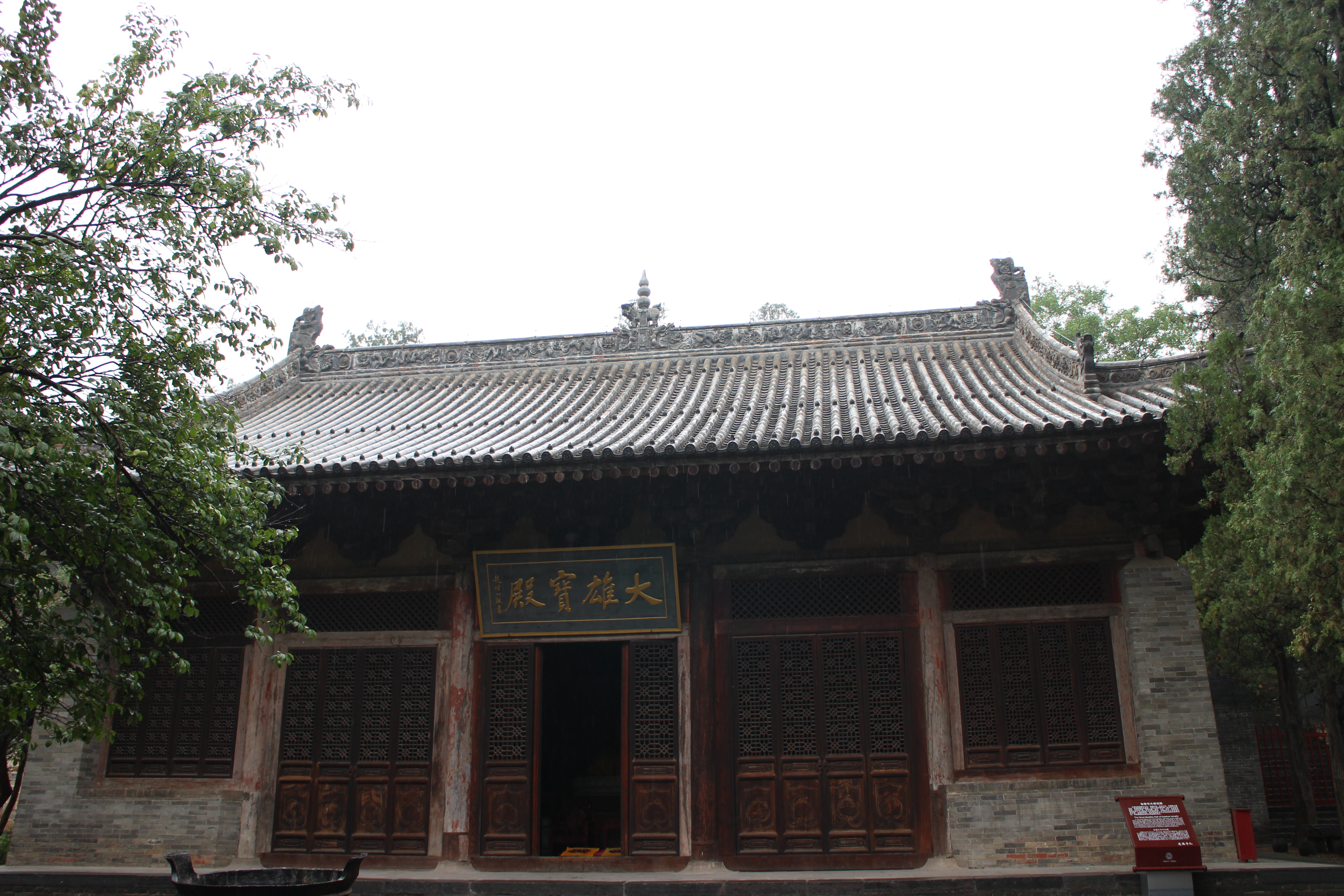
Huishan Temple

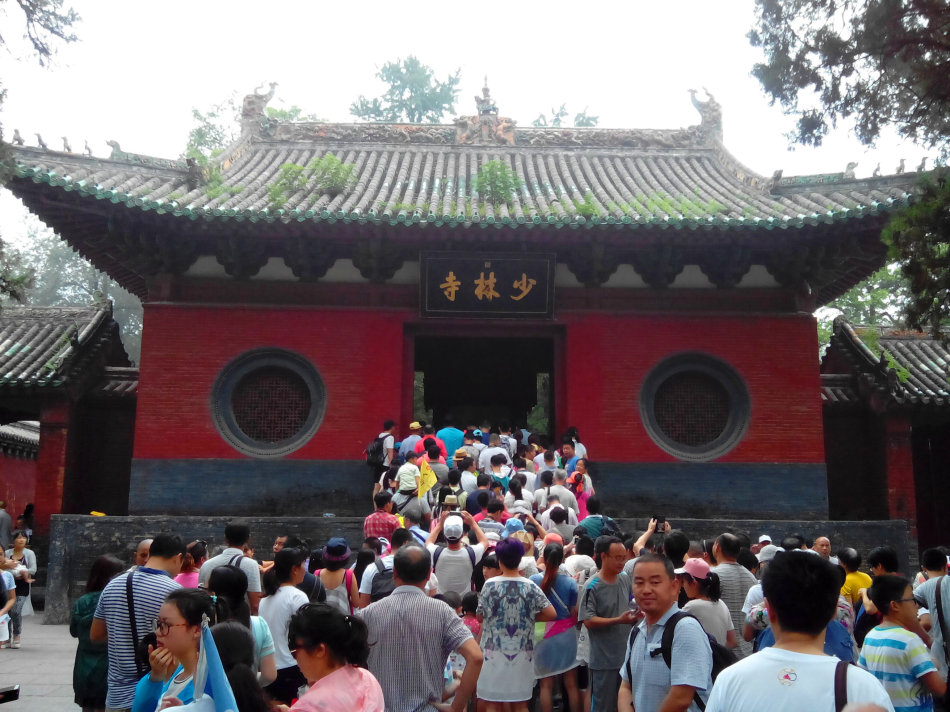
Shaolin Temple

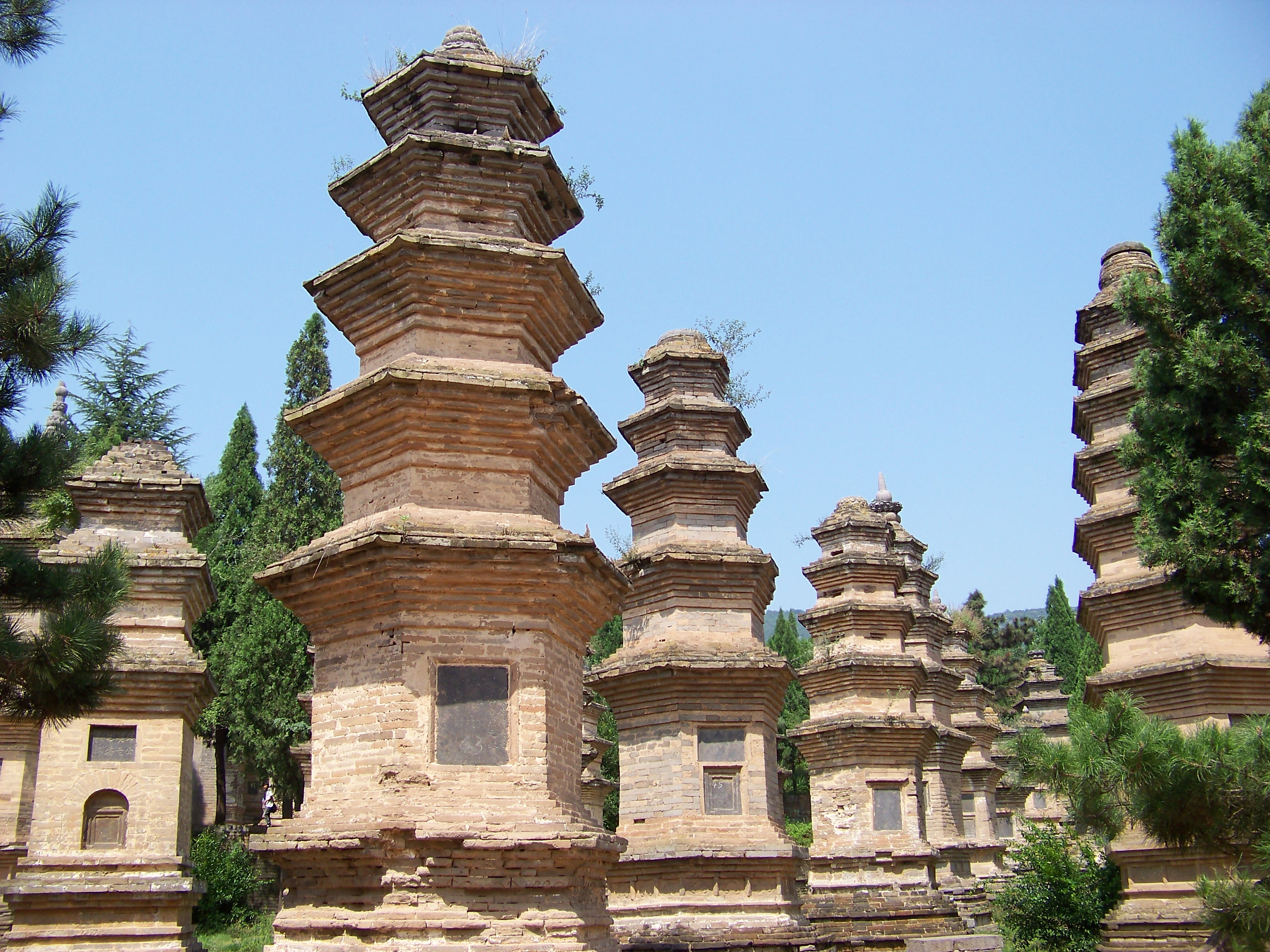
Pagoda Forest, Shaolin temple

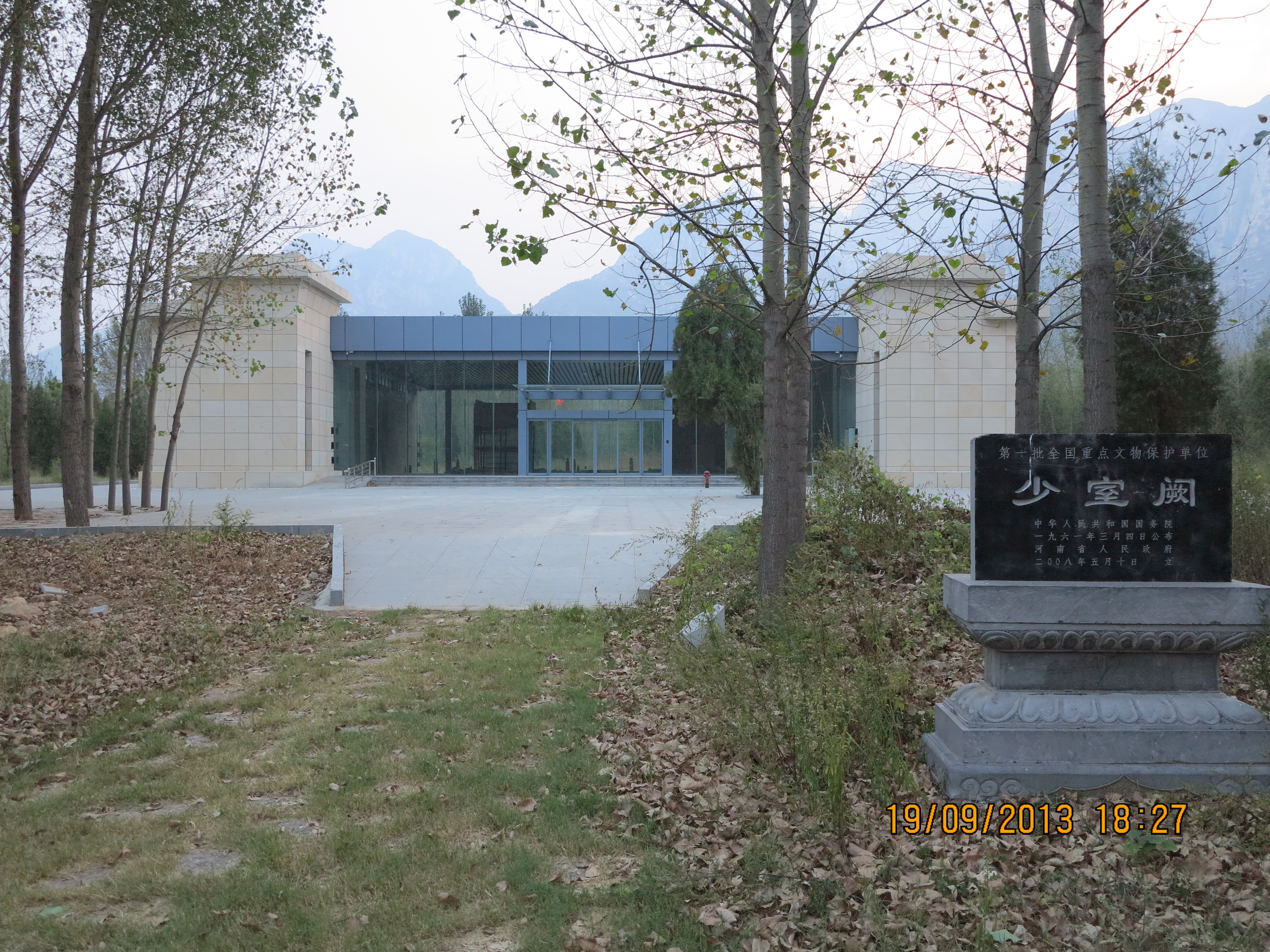
Shaoshi Que

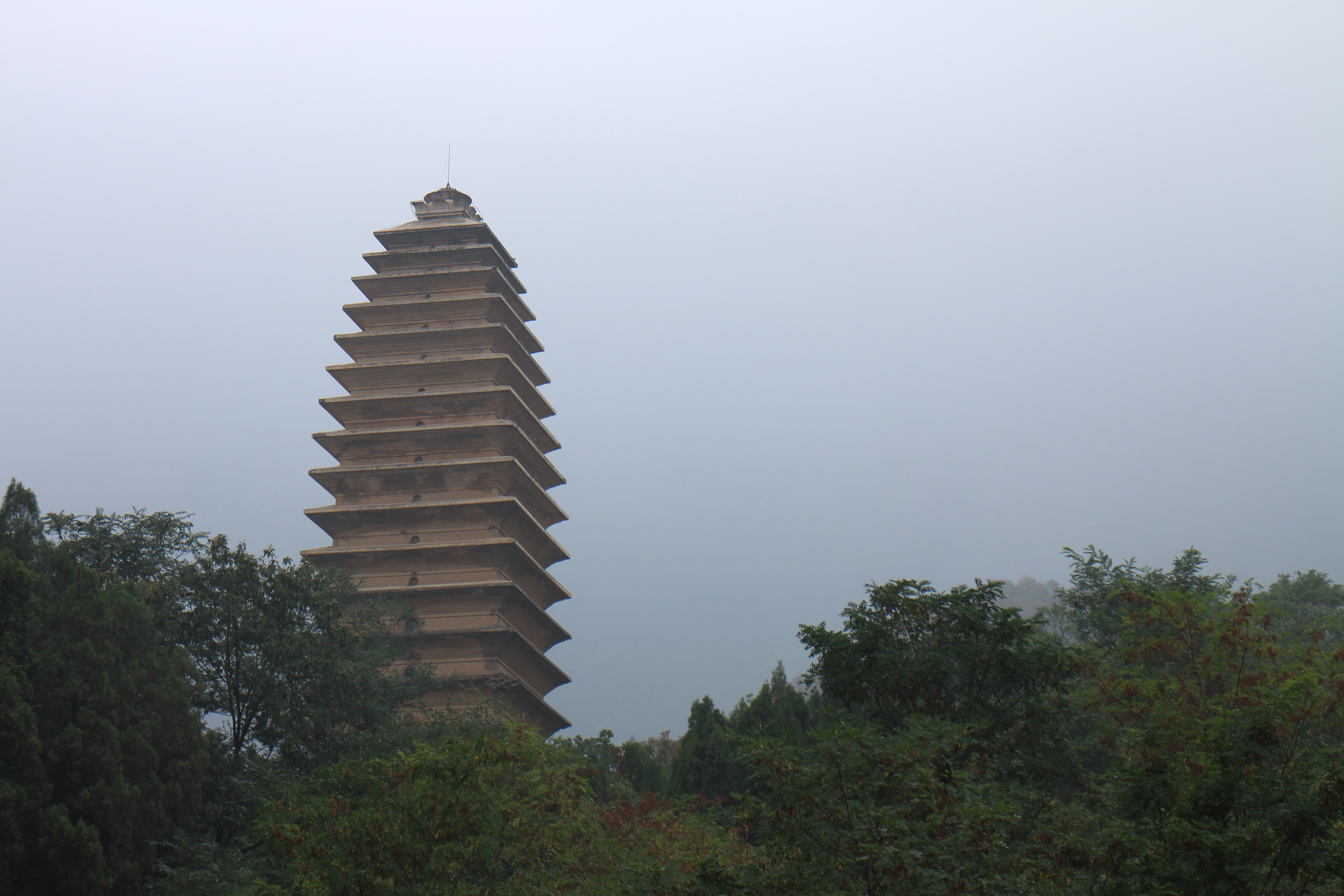
Fawang temple Pagoda

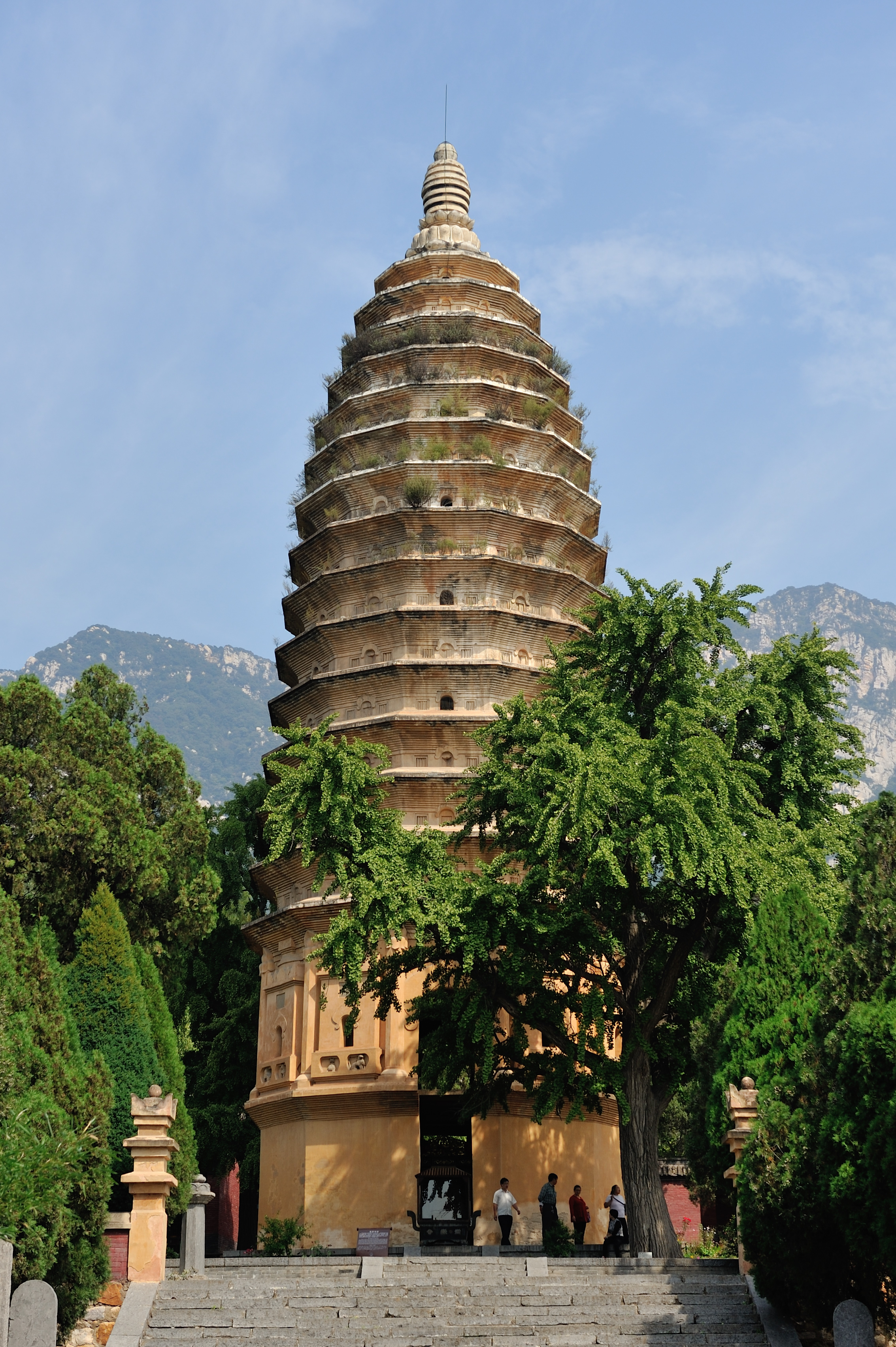
Pagoda of Songyue temple

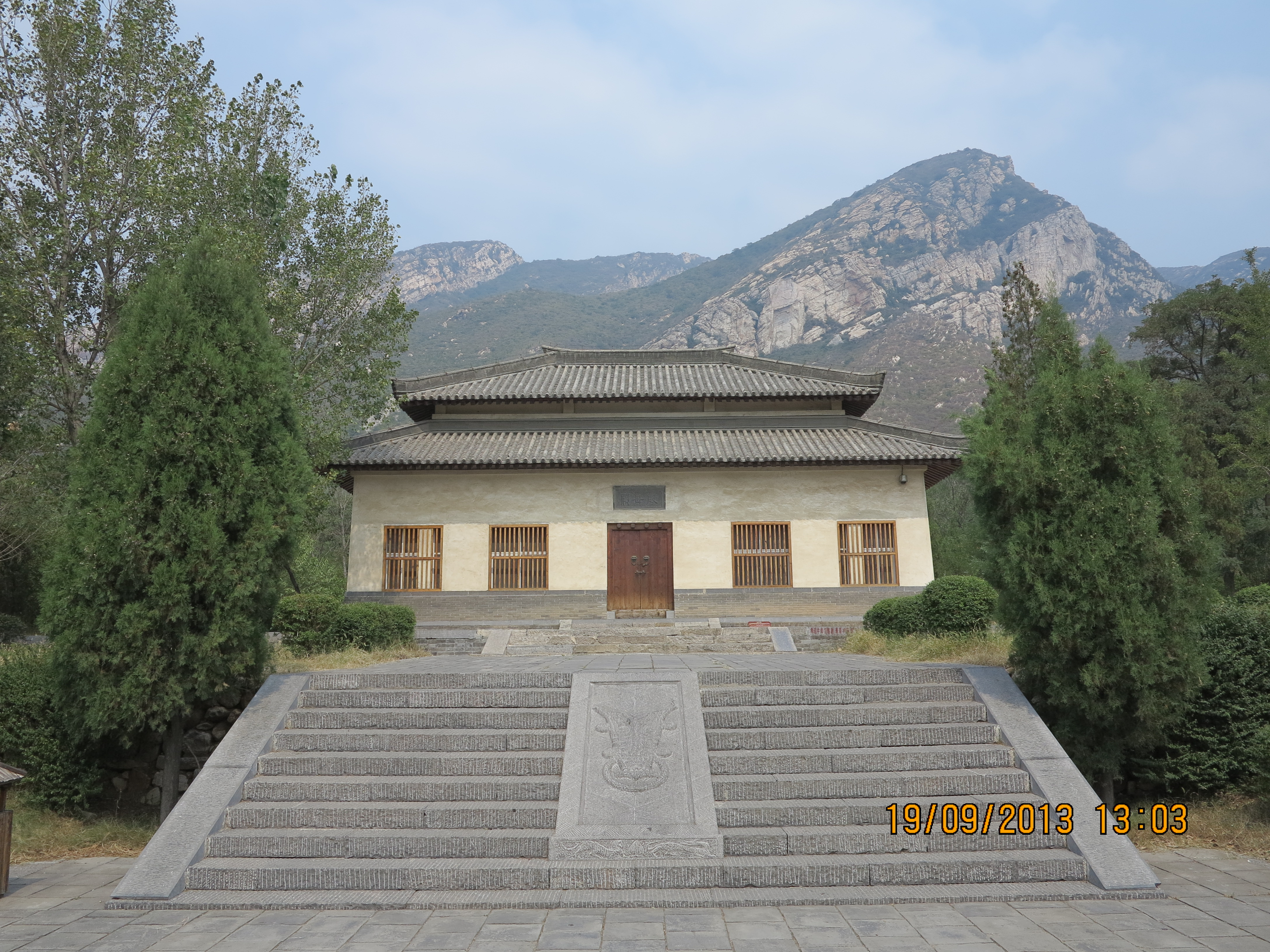
Taishi Que

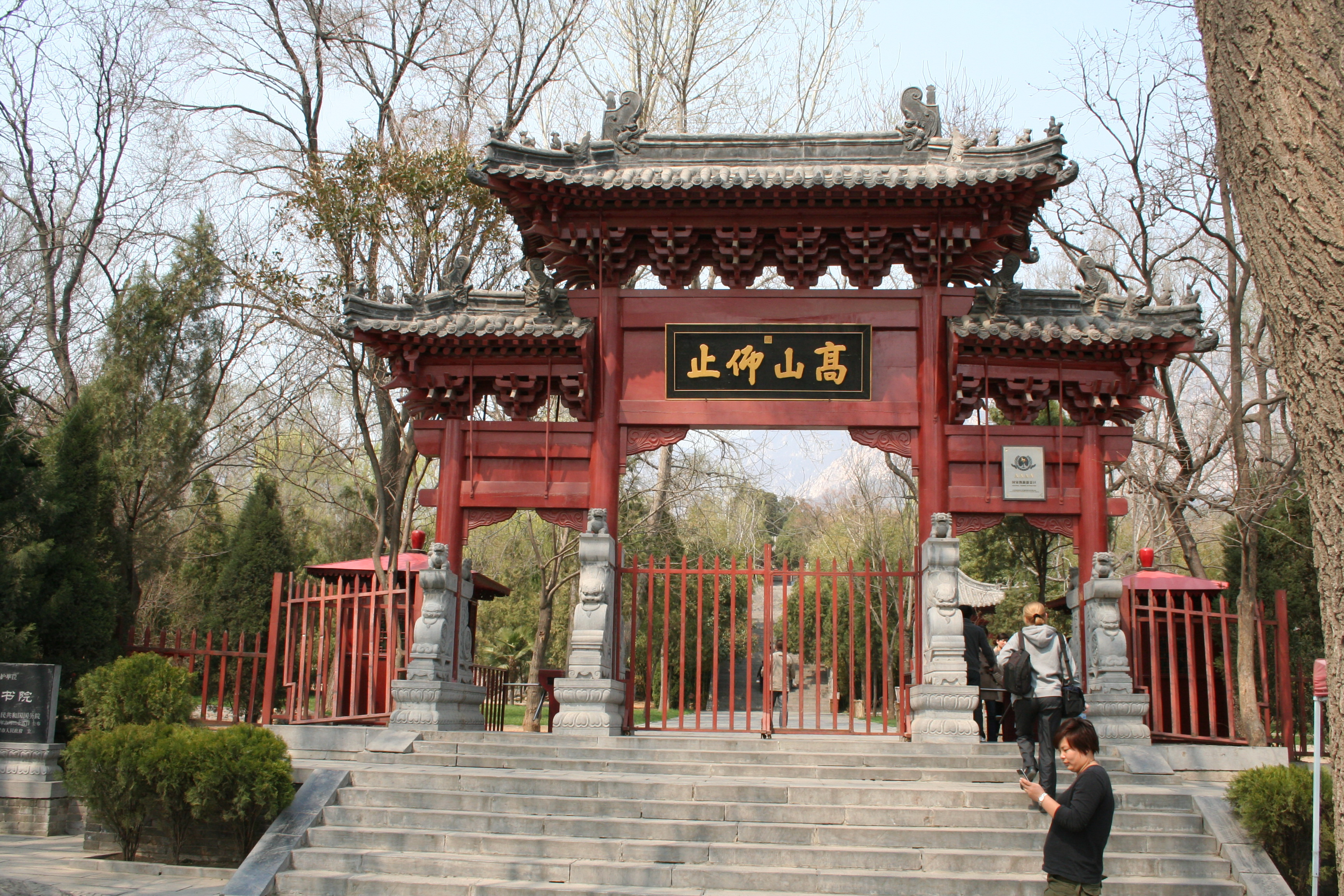
Songyang Academy

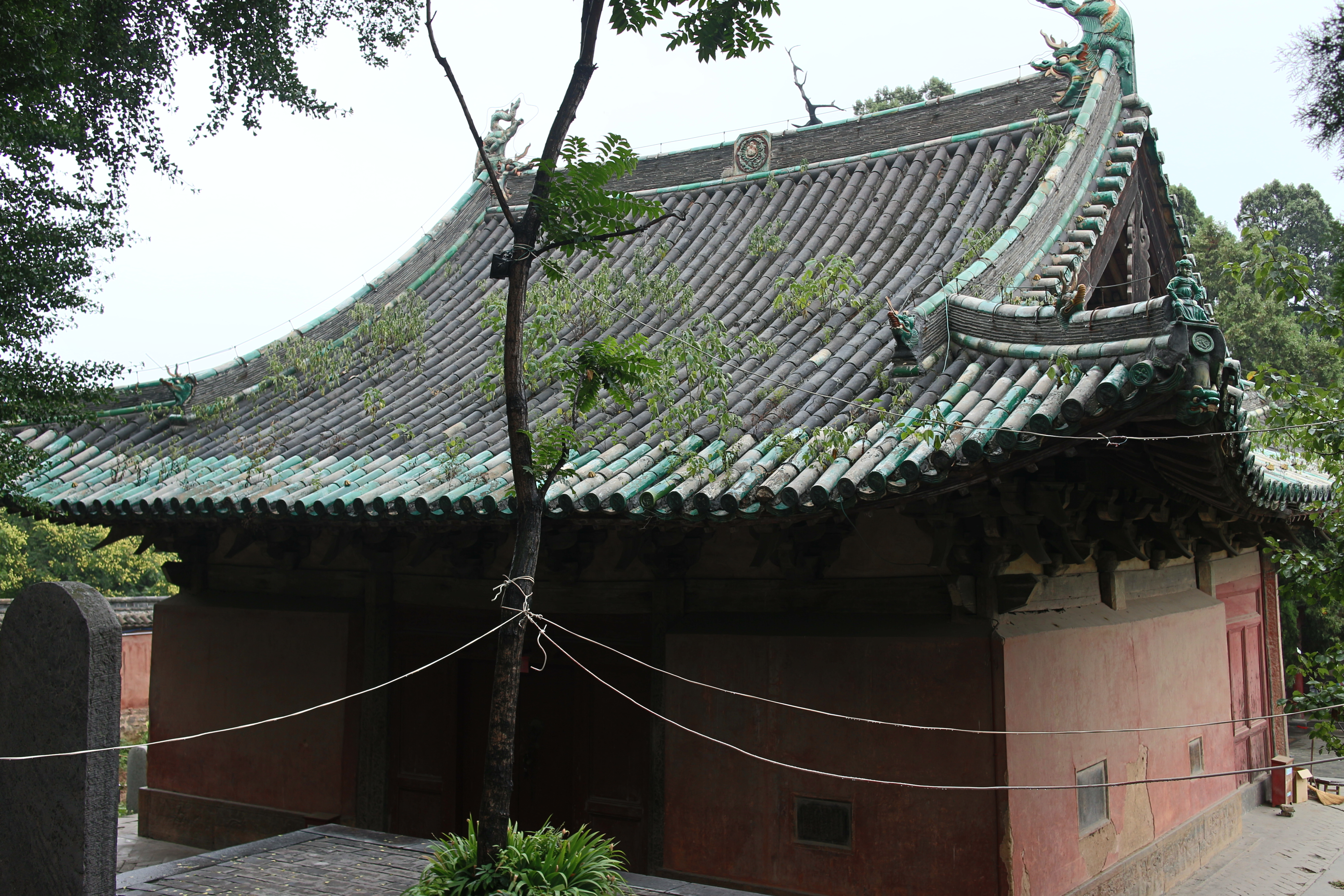
Chuzu Temple

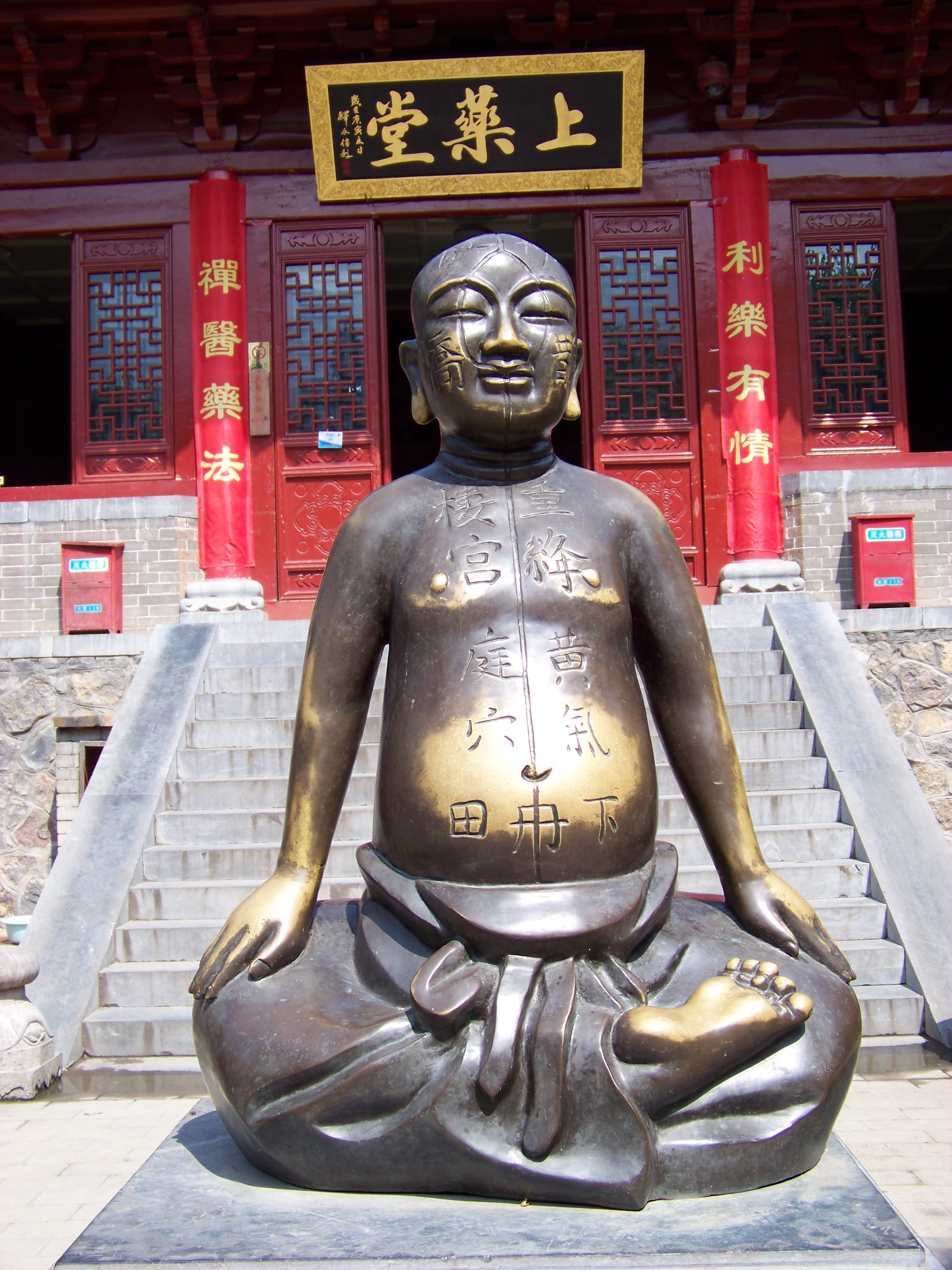
Monk Statue at Shaolin Temple

== See also ==
- Yangcheng (historical city)
