= Gaocheng, Henan =

Gaocheng 告成镇
- Town
- Location in Henan
- Coordinates: 34°24′02″N 113°09′01″E
- Country: People's Republic of China
- Province: Henan
- Prefecture-level city: Zhengzhou
- County-level city: Dengfeng
- Time zone: UTC+8 (China Standard)

Gaocheng (Chinese: 告成; pinyin: Gàochéng) is a town in Dengfeng, Henan province, China. As of 2020, it has 30 villages under its administration.

- Gaocheng Village
- Quhe Village (曲河村)
- Shuangmiao Village (双庙村)
- Beigou Village (北沟村)
- Zhuyuan Village (竹园村)
- Wudu Village (五渡村)
- Jiagou Village (贾沟村)
- Chatinggou Village (茶亭沟村)
- Bafang Village (八方村)
- Senzigou Village (森子沟村)
- Fandian Village (范店村)
- Jietou Village (界头村)
- Wang Village (王村)
- Yanggou Village (杨沟村)
- Baogou Village (豹沟村)
- Weiyuangou Village (苇园沟村)
- Yeshang Village (冶上村)
- Wangyao Village (王窑村)
- Shuiyu Village (水峪村)
- Wangjiamen Village (王家门村)
- Miaozhuang Village (庙庄村)
- Tianjiagou Village (田家沟村)
- Shiyangguan Village (石羊关村)
- Jiangzhuang Village (蒋庄村)
- Nanyanzhuang Village (南烟庄村)
- Lüzhuang Village (铝庄村)
- Gaojietou Village (高界头村)
- Yuanyao Village (袁爻村)
- Beiyanzhuang Village (北烟庄村)
- Wujia Village (吴家村)

== See also ==
- List of township-level divisions of Henan
- Yangcheng (historical city)
