= Dengfeng tourist railway =

Proposed railway line in Dengfeng, China

The Dengfeng tourist railway is a Chinese railway currently under construction in the city of Dengfeng. Created primarily to benefit tourism in and around the city, the railway is intended to be complete by 2026.

== Consortium ==
On 10 September 2018, Raffles Investment and Development Company, a subsidiary of Singapore-based Raffles Infrastructure, signed an agreement with China Railway Construction Corporation (CRRC), 23 Bureau, and Chengdu Tianfu Railtech Valley Technology, to form a consortium to bid for infrastructure-related projects in China. On 19 October 2018, the consortium signed an agreement with the Tourism Board of the government of Dengfeng City, China to build a tourist railway in Dengfeng City at an estimated cost of 6 billion yuan ($US 864.4 million).

== Construction ==
The line is planned to be constructed in four stages, starting in 2018 and ending in 2026. For each stage, a land survey report and environmental report are required.

- Phase one (2018–2020): Songshan Tourist Centre to Shaolin Temple, 15 km (9.3 mi), Yuan 1.3 billion
- Phase two (2020–2022): Songshan Tourist Centre to Songshan Study Courtyard and Zhongyue Temple, 15 km (9.3 mi), Yuan 1.3 billion
- Phase three (2022–2024): Zhongyue Temple to Luya Waterfall and Safari Zoological Park, 15 km (9.3 mi), Yuan 1.3 billion
- Phase four (2024–2026): Safari Zoological Park to Chaoyanggou Xiqu Town, 20 km (12 mi), Yuan 1.7 billion

== Sources ==
- "Raffles Infrastructure to build Chinese tourist line" International Railway Journal, 24 October 2018
- "Raffles signs $865.7m contract for railway construction in China", RAILWAY TECHNOLOGY, retrieved 30 October 2018
- "Raffles Infrastructure to build tourist railway in China for $1.2 bil", The EDGE Singapore, by PC Lee, 22 October 2018
- DengFeng City, Raffles Infrastructure, retrieved 5 June 2022
