= Fawang Temple =

Buddhist temple near Dengfeng, Henan, China

- Chinese: 法王寺 (Chinese)
- The full official name in English letters is da fa wang si, "Dharma King Temple," where da fa wang is the name of the Buddha given by his disciples to Sakyamuni. English usually shortens this to Fa Wang or Fa-Wang or Dafawang and uses monastery for si instead of temple.
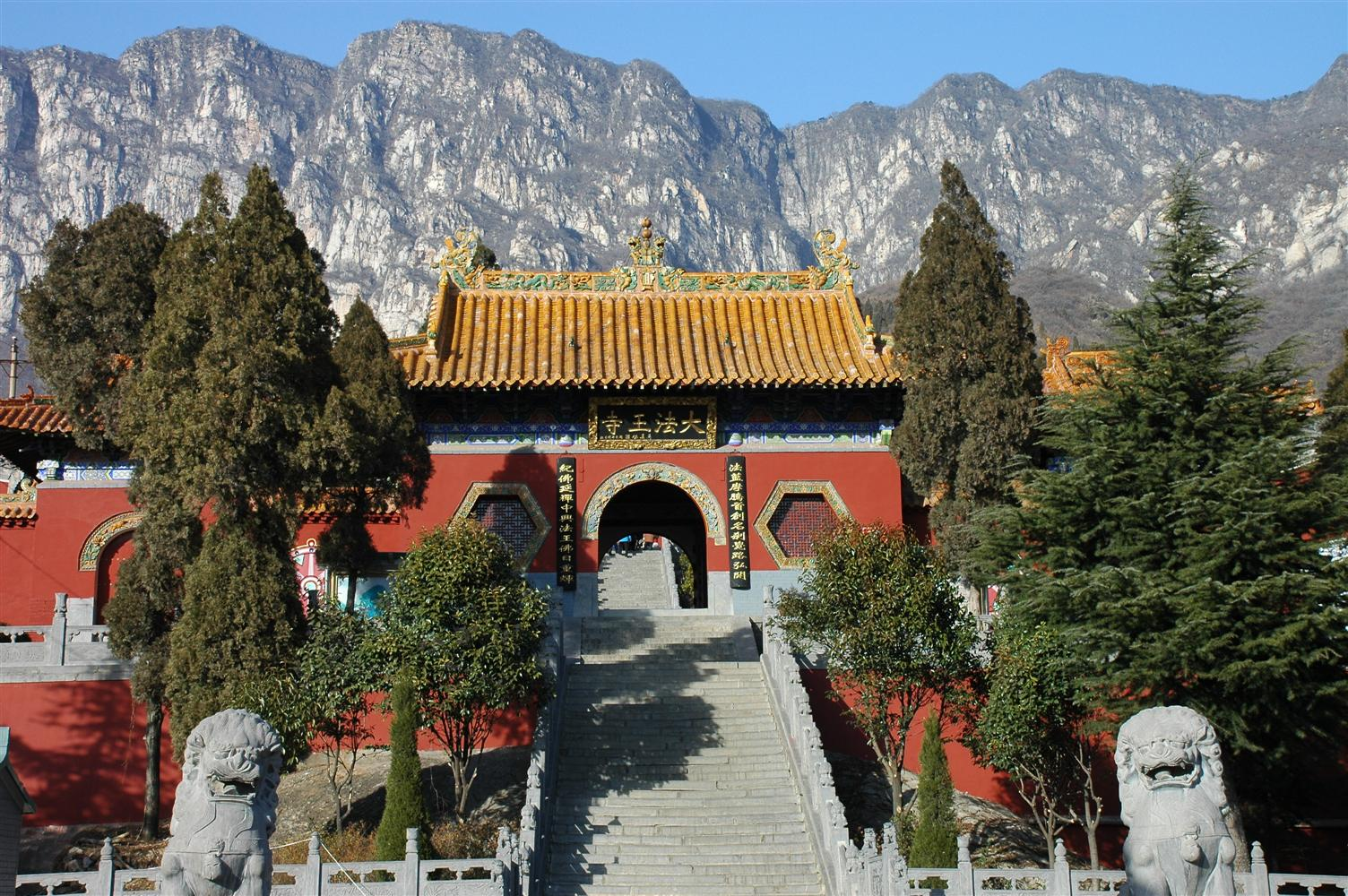
- The temple entrance from the south. In the background is the Taishi range.

- Location of the temple in China
- 34°30′08″N 113°01′36″E
- Location: Mount Song
- Region: Dengfeng, Henan, central China
- Part of: UNESCO global geopark

History
- Built: Constantly repaired and improved since initial construction in 71 AD.

Site notes
- Length: 326 m (357 yd)
- Width: 73 m (80 yd)
- Condition: Restored, improved, updated, secularized.
- Owner: People's Republic of China
- Management: Shaolin Temple Management Committee, of which the Abbott is Director. They are responsible to the National People’s Congress.
- Public access: Paid admission
- Website: https://www.kungfuchina-fawang-temple.com/

Fawang Temple (Chinese: 法王寺) is a modern Chinese Buddhist monastery located 5 km (3.1 mi) northwest of the town of Dengfeng in Henan province, China. Situated at the bottom of the Yuzhu Peak of Mount Song, the monastery claims to be the descendant of the second Buddhist monastery constructed in China. However, the type of Buddhism espoused before the revolution was Chan (ancestor of Japanese Zen), which had not yet evolved in the time of the monastery's legendary founding.

The modern management are careful to use the term "secularized" of the associated martial arts school, defining it to mean "unconstrained by Buddhist precepts." The martial arts school, named the "Shaolin Temple Secular Disciples' Martial Arts School" is international. In the winter off-season it trains a body of permanent students. For the rest of the year it holds training seminars of varying numbers of weeks for students unlimited by nationality or age.

The revolutionary government of the People's Republic of China has varied in its approach to this and other Buddhist monasteries. Mao Zedong ignored kung-fu as a method of serious fighting, advising his soldiers strike solid blows instead. Subsequently Mao made it known that he valued the monasteries as a Chinese tradition, and was seen touring them. However, the Cultural Revolution devalued them. That policy was reversed on Mao's death. Currently the government appears to be supportive to the monasteries as cultural assets.

The Mount Song region has become a major tourist center. Under government jurisdiction since 1949, the monasteries generally receive all the funding they need. In return they generate a large geotourist income. The monks to some degree have become showmen and acrobats. They give special displays and shows dressed in costume or with body paint and evidence considerable acrobatic agility. During the early 21st century Mount Song became a UNESCO global geopark, which requires a commitment to geotourism.

== Local geography ==
=== Temple ===
The monastery occupies a hanging valley on the south slopes of Mount Taishi, one of the peak islands of Mount Song. Yuzhufeng ("Yuzhu peak") (Note: Not to be confused with Yuzhu Peak, a mountain in Tibet.) flanks the east side. It is a ridge of peaks forming a part of the lower ridge system of Taishi, known for its scenic views. Songshan Scenic Spot is officially one of them. The monks report, "there are thousands of cliffs and valleys; the hills and forests are dense."

The valley points at Taishi. The west side of the valley is termed figuratively "the dragon," and the east side "the tiger." They "embrace each other" on the north. The southern end runs over a 300 m (980 ft) drop into the Shuyuen River. Regarding the valley, the monks find such terms as "hidden," "secret," and "secluded" appropriate.

On the east the col between two elevations of Yuzhu is termed "the Song Gate." During the Mid-Autumn Festival, celebrating the equinox, the moon rises in the gate, lighting up the valley. The valley ascends from south to north, giving a view of Taishi.

=== Pagoda forest ===
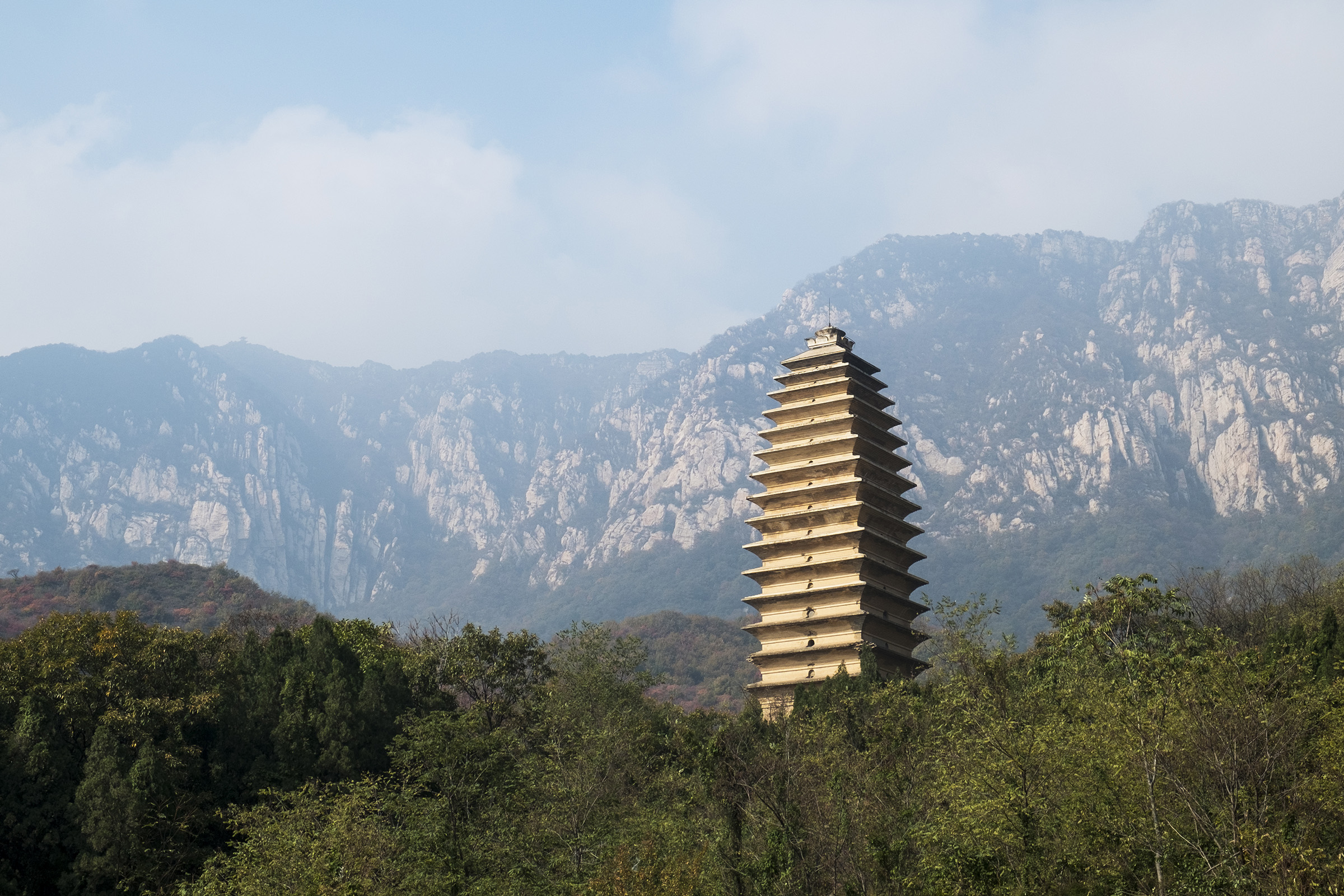
Fawang Temple Pagoda

The temple has its own pagoda forest (distinct from that of the Shaolin Temple) located up the slope to the north at 34°30′26″N 113°1′11″E. The Fawang Temple pagodas were built mainly during the Tang dynasty (618–907), but some are later, in the Yuan dynasty (1271–1368).

The most prominent of these early Tang era pagodas is a 40 m (131 ft) tall square-based stone tower with eaves, its ground floor measuring 7 m (23 ft) on each side with 2 m (6.5 ft) thick walls. Inside this pagoda is a shrine and a jade statue of the Buddha that was presented to the pagoda in 1409 by a member of the royal family stationed in Luoyang during the Ming dynasty. This pagoda follows the similar design style of other Tang pagodas, such as multi-eaved, square-based Xumi Pagoda and Small Wild Goose Pagoda. Other Tang pagodas include three one-story pavilion style brick pagodas, each about 10 m (32 ft) high. Each one of these is capped with a conical roof with arc eaves.

== History of the institution ==
Despite the many refurbishments and improvements remnants of the ancient structures remain, such as the southern gate with its hexagonal windows, Roman arch doorway (though not built under any western influence), ornate roof, and grand staircase guarded by stone mythical creatures. The similarity of this gate to a parallel gate in the nearby Shaolin Monastery suggests a common architecture and common period of foundation. The bundling together of these two temples with two others, the Songyue and Huishan, under the historical name "the Four Temples of Mount Songshan" is believed to indicate they were all formed in the same period, and further, they represent the introduction of Chan Buddhism to the area. The introduction of the name into history, however, is not dated.

The pagodas in the cemetery are studied as Tang dynasty architecture. The pagodas have a history; the temple does not. While it is often true in archaeology that cemeteries can be used to date habitations mainly unavailable because currently inhabited, a conclusion that Chan Buddhism, Kung Fu, a common temple architecture, and fully developed pagodas appeared suddenly at the beginning of the Tang Dynasty strains the credibility. There are literary sources portraying an earlier development probably obliterated by the later.

In one source of the legend, (Note: "Book of the Later Han: Biography of King Chu Born Liu Yang.) Emperor Ming of Han, ruler of the Eastern Han Dynasty had a dream that a man emitting golden light flew into his palace and landed in the courtyard. Consulting his courtiers he was told of an Indian legend of Buddha exercising special powers of glowing and flying. The dream would signify the Buddha bringing enlightenment to Ming's court. He did not wait, but sent two emissaries to India, Cai Yin and Qin Jing, to investigate the religion. The year was 64. They returned to Ming's capital, Luoyang, in 68 carrying saddlebags of Buddhist scriptures and statuettes on two white horses, accompanied by two instructors, She Moteng and Zhu Felan.

The Indian disciples were lodged in the state guest house, Honglu Temple. Their first task was to translate the scriptures, for which purpose the emperor gave them the guest house, renaming it to pai ma si, White Horse Temple, after the horses that had ported the scriptures. Some consider this the first Buddhist temple in China. Meanwhile the emperor's court began convert, notably Liu Jun, the Marquis Yangshen. Decreeing that he was allowed to convert, in 71 the emperor built a monastery for him in Mount Songshan, the initial Fawang Temple. Some consider this to be the first Chinese Buddhist temple, others the second.

== See also ==
- Mount Song

== Reference bibliography ==
- Ren, Wei; He, Yan (2021). Historic Monuments of Mount Songshan. Shanghai: Shanghai Far East Publisher.
