= Yangcheng (historical city) =

First capital of the Xia Dynasty of China

- Chinese: 陽城
- Traditional Chinese: 陽城
- Simplified Chinese: 阳城
Transcriptions
Standard Mandarin
- Hanyu Pinyin: Yángchéng
- IPA: [jǎŋ.ʈʂʰə̌ŋ]
Yue: Cantonese
- Jyutping: joeng4 sing4
- IPA: [yœŋ˩.sɪŋ˩]
Middle Chinese
- Middle Chinese: Yang Dzyeng
Old Chinese
- Baxter–Sagart (2014): *laŋ [d]eŋ
- Zhengzhang: /*laŋ djeŋ/

Yangcheng (阳城; 陽城; Yángchéng) was the first capital of the Xia dynasty (c. 2070–1600 BC) of China. In ancient texts, the city was founded by Yu the Great (founder of the Xia), or was his residence. In the Bamboo Annals and Shiben, Yangcheng was located near Mount Song and the Wudu and Ying rivers (close to modern Gaocheng, Henan).

== Archeology ==
Yangcheng may be located at the Wangchenggang (王城岗) site in Gaocheng, Henan. In 1977, An Jinhuai (安金槐) excavated a small east-west oriented walled city at Wangchenggang; it is dated to the second period of the Longshan era, or approaching the start of the Xia. In 2002–2005, a larger walled city was discovered and radiocarbon dated as the earliest and largest Xia-period site at Wangchenggang.

An and Sun Zuoyun (孙作云) believed the small city to be Yangcheng, and this interpretation remained popular through the rest of the 20th century. One criticism was that the city was too small to be a capital of a major state.

Since its discovery, the larger city has been associated with Yangcheng. The smaller city has been attributed to Gun, Yu's predecessor, although Liu and Chen note that the 100 year difference between the two cities makes this unlikely.
