= Songyue Pagoda =

Pagoda on Mount Song, Henan, China

- 嵩岳寺塔
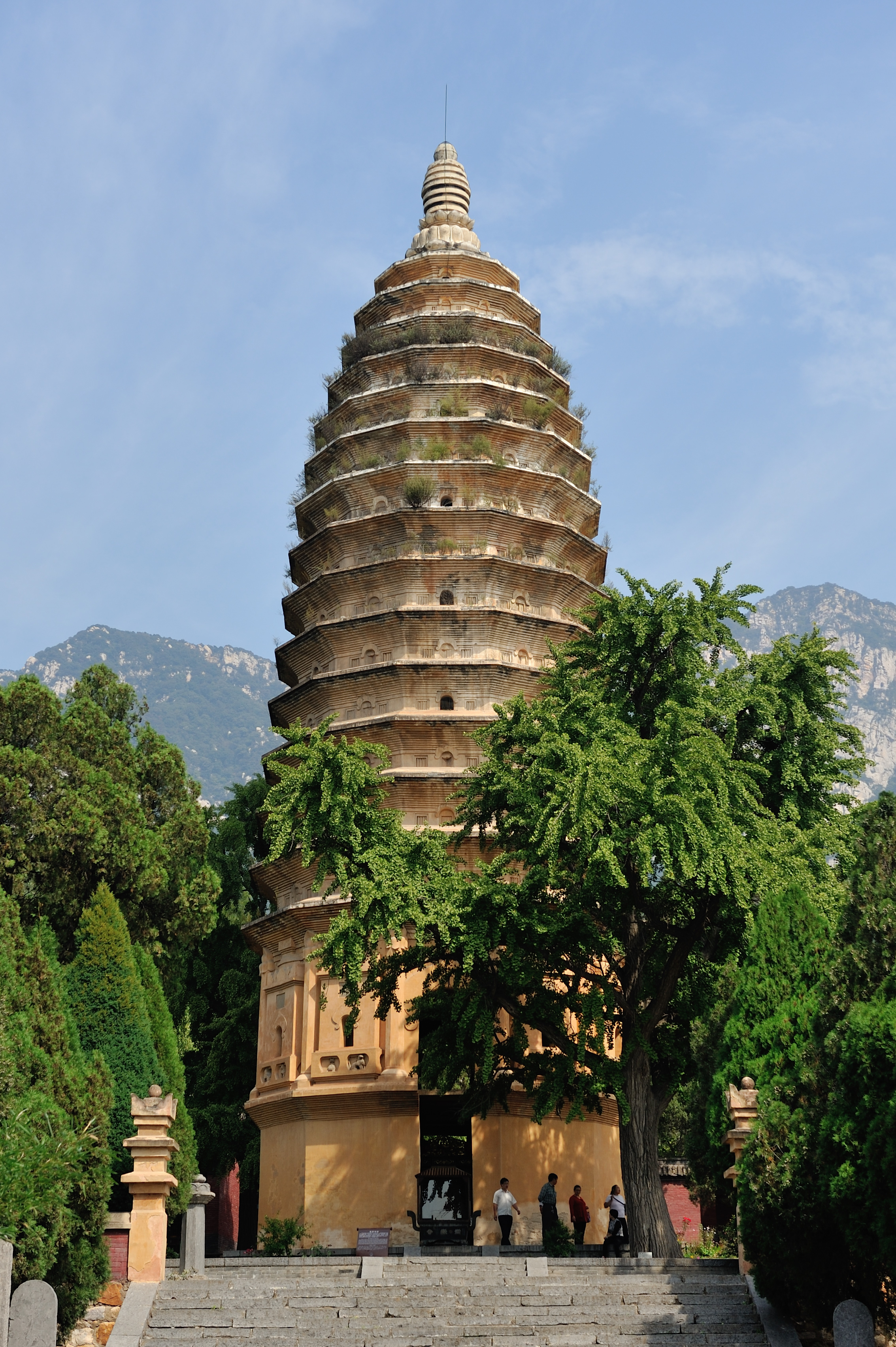
- The Pagoda in 2015

- Location in Henan

Religion
- Affiliation: Buddhism

Location
- Country: Dengfeng, Zhengzhou, Henan
- Coordinates: 34°30′06″N 113°00′57″E

The Songyue Pagoda (Chinese: 嵩岳寺塔; pinyin: Sōngyuè sìtǎ), constructed in 523 CE, is located at the Songyue Monastery on Mount Song, in Henan province, China. Built during the Northern Wei Dynasty, this pagoda is one of the few intact sixth-century pagodas in China and is also the earliest known Chinese brick pagoda. In 2010, the Pagoda was inscribed on the UNESCO World Heritage List along with other nearby monuments as part of the Historic Monuments of Dengfeng in "The Centre of Heaven and Earth" site.

== Background ==
The spread of Buddhism dramatically influenced Chinese architecture. By the sixth century, Buddhism had spread with tremendous momentum throughout China: Chinese culture was adjusting and adapting its traditions to include Buddhism worship. The Chinese transformed the rounded earthen mound of the South Asian stupa into the towering pagoda to house the sacred buried relics of Buddha at its core. Built in 523 at the Songyue Monastery of Mount Song in Henan province during the Northern dynasties period, the Songyue Pagoda is the earliest surviving pagoda in China constructed with brick. Most structures from that period were made of wood and have not survived, although ruins of rammed earth fortifications still exist, as do stone structures such as que gate towers dating back to the Han dynasty (202 BC – 220 AD) that have decorative features imitating wooden architectural components. Brick and stone Chinese pagodas also typically have decorative elements that imitate wooden features such as interlocking brackets.

== Style and shape ==
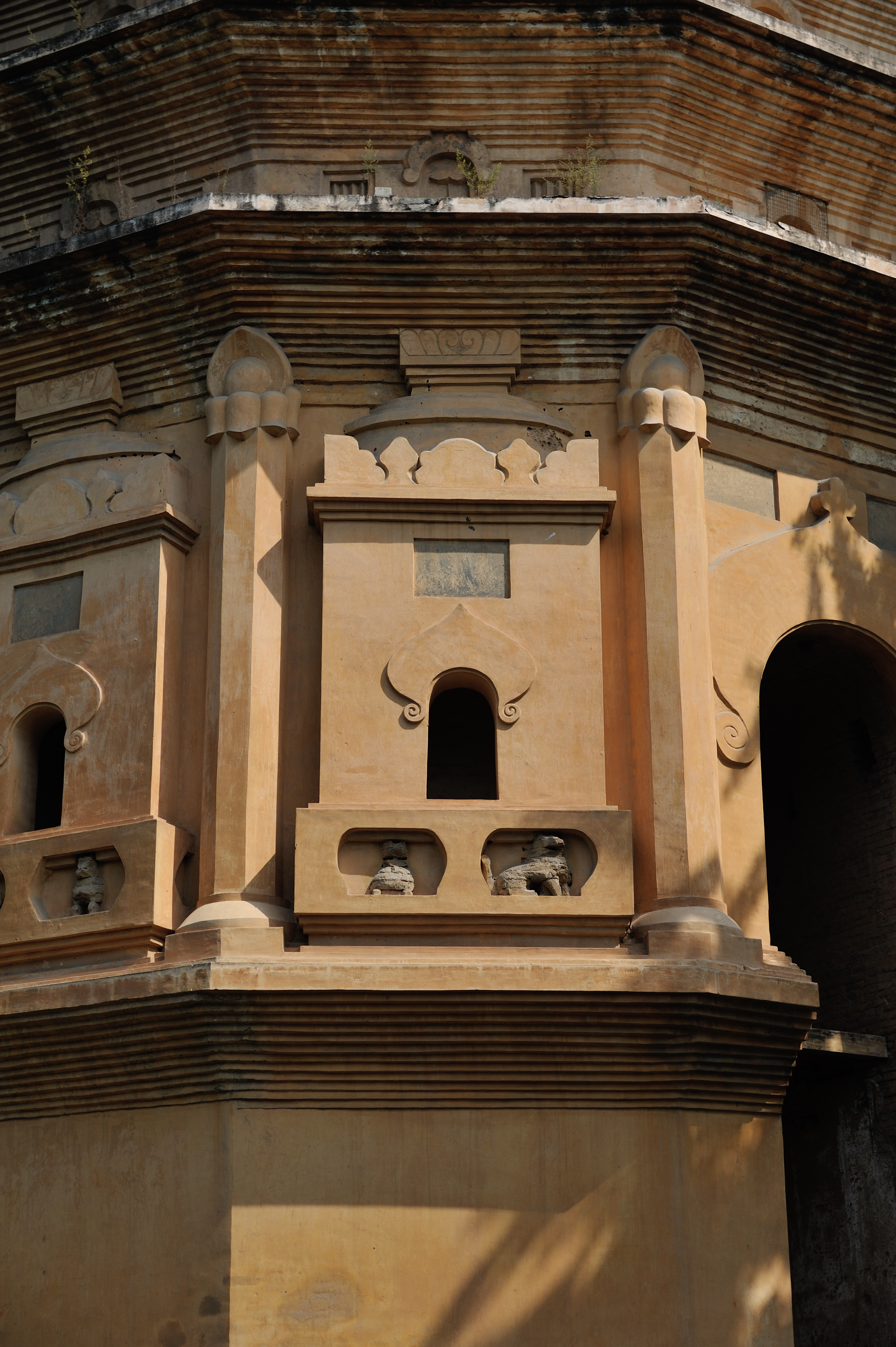
Detail of the pagoda

The pagoda has had a changing shape over time from its Indian Buddhist origins to its form in China. The unique many-sided shape of the Songyue Pagoda suggests that it represents an early attempt to merge the Chinese architecture of straight edges with the circular style of Buddhism from the Indian subcontinent. The perimeter of the pagoda decreases as it rises, as this is seen in Indian and Central Asian Buddhist cave temple pillars and the later round pagodas in China.

The Songyue Pagoda is unique in form, being twelve-sided. The tower is 40 m (131 ft) high and built of yellowish brick held together with clay mortar. It is the oldest surviving pagoda and was built at a time when, according to records, almost all pagodas were composed of wood.

The pagoda has a low, plain brick pedestal or base, and a very high first story characteristic of pagodas with multiple eaves, with balconies dividing the first story into two layers and doors connecting the two parts. The ornamented arch doors and decorative apses or niches are intricately carved into teapots or lions. At the base of the door pillars are carvings shaped as lotus flowers and the pillar capitals have carved pearls and lotus flowers. After the first story there are fifteen closely spaced roofs lined with eaves and small lattice windows. The pagoda features densely clustered ornamental bracked eaves in the dougong style ornamenting each story. Inside the pagoda, the wall is cylindrical with eight levels of projecting stone supports for what was probably wooden flooring originally. Beneath the pagoda is an underground series of burial rooms to preserve cultural objects buried with the dead. The inner most chamber contained Buddhist relics, transcripts of Buddhist scriptures and statues of Buddha.

== See also ==
- Chinese pagoda
- Dhamek Stupa
