= Pagoda Forest at Shaolin Temple =

Buddhist cemetery under Mount Song, Henan, China

- 塔林, Ta Lin (Chinese)
- Tower Forest
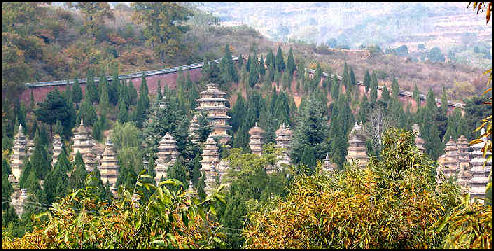
- Pagoda Forest

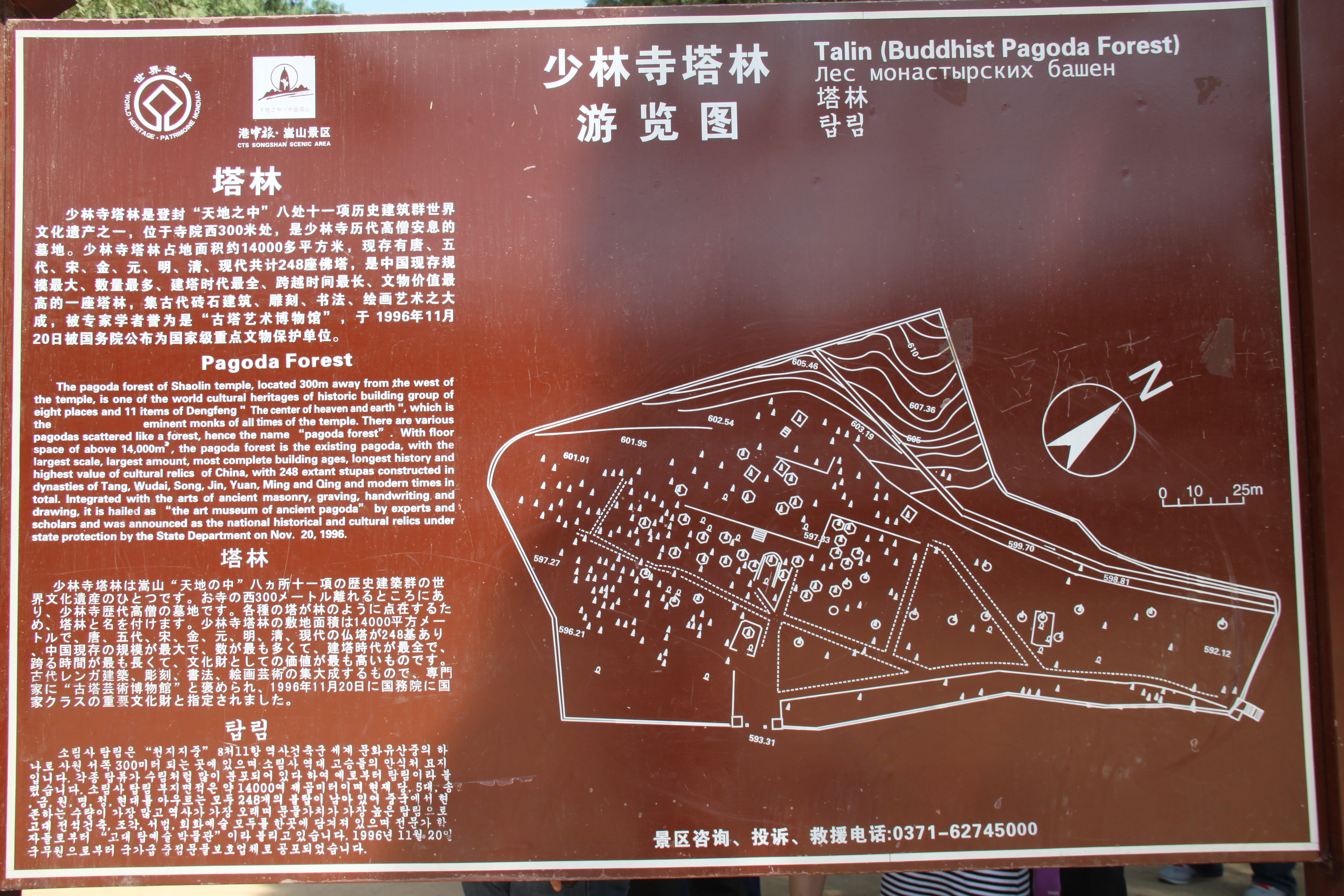

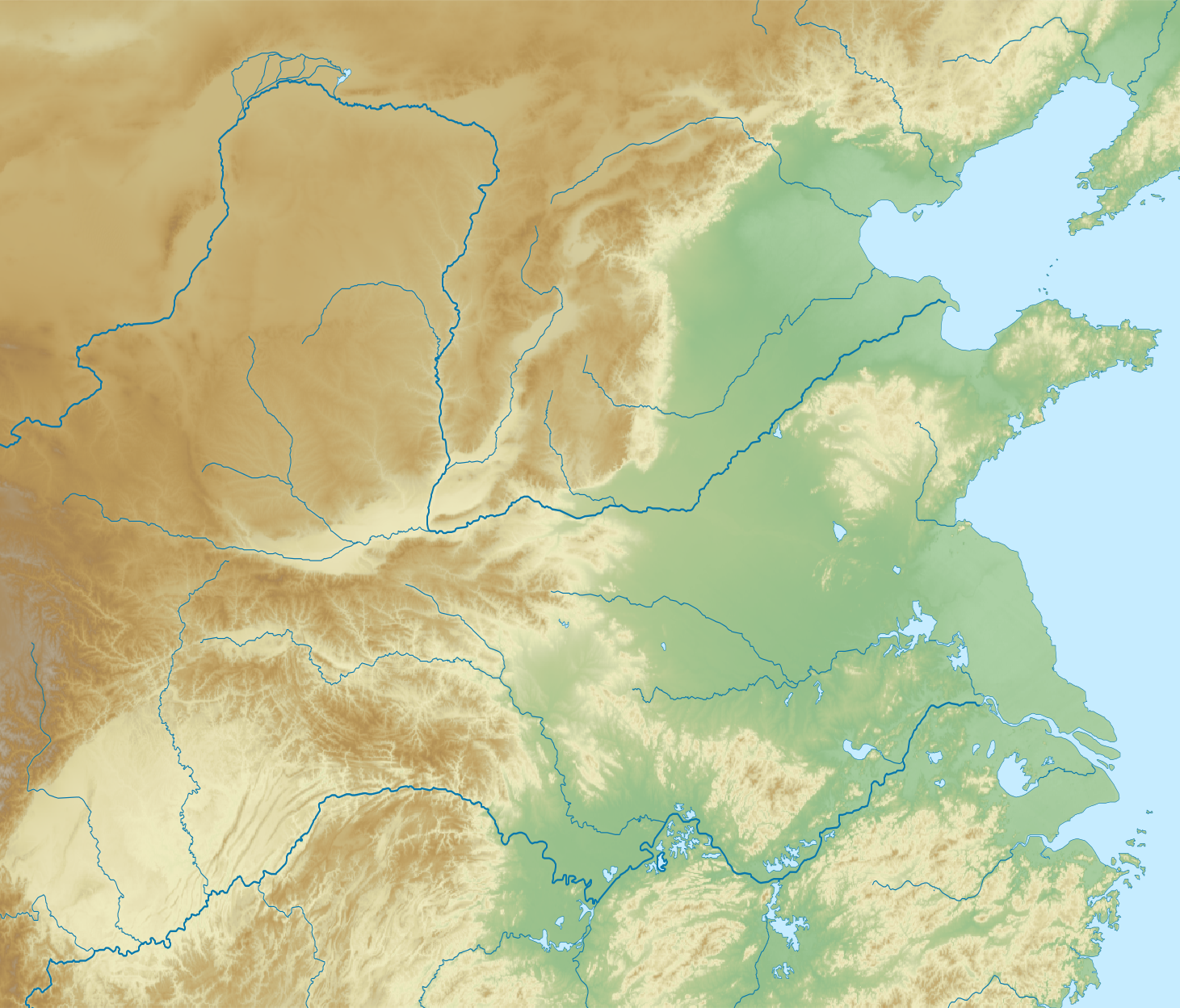
- Location of the site in China's Northern Plain
- Interactive map of Pagoda Forest at Shaolin Temple
- 34°30′19″N 112°56′19″E
- Type: Buddhist cemetery
- Location: Shaolin Temple, Mount Song, Henan Province, Northern Plain, China

Site notes
- Area: 21,000 m^{2} (5.2 acres)
- Architectural style: Various
- Condition: Well preserved, some pagodas partially restored
- Owner: People's Republic of China
- Public access: Yes; with admission ticket (barring special circumstances)
- Note: the specifications in this box are or are based on the definition of the site given in the official sign displayed above. Some specifications by other authors may be stated in the text or the notes.

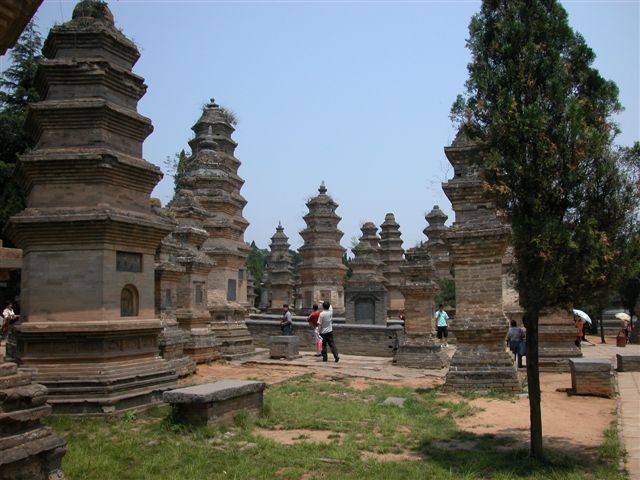
The Pagoda forest, wide view

The Pagoda Forest at Shaolin Temple is the main cemetery for Buddhist monks at the Shaolin Temple under Mount Song. Consisting of about 250 memorial pagodas beneath or in which the ashes of the deceased were placed, the cemetery covers about 21,000 m^{2} (5.2 acres). The cemetery is forested. Its name, "tower forest" (Chinese 塔林, Ta Lin) (Note: The full article title in Chinese is 少林寺塔林, Shaolin si ta lin, "Shaolin Temple Tower Forest.") reflects that fact, whether because the pagodas are like a forest, or are in a forest. (Note: The English-speaking world frequently uses "Forest Cemetery" in no context that has to do with forests, just because it is a restful name.) The usual English translation is "Pagoda Forest." Its center is about 250 m (270 yd) from monastery grounds.

These memorial "pagodas" are not real ones, which are inhabitable buildings of one or more stories with roofs bearing upturned eaves. Symbolically the memorial imitations are habitations of the dead, representing real towers. In English the upturned roofs are often termed "tiers." The number of tiers in the memorial tower are compatible with the former status of the deceased.

The continuity covers more than 1,200 years, but usage continues at a slow rate. Not every monk can be interred there; for the most part they are illustrious in some way. Apart from two pagodas representing groups of monks, the ordinary monks not in leadership positions were interred outside the Pagoda Forest in the graves of ordinary men.

During their 1,200 years, the monastic facilities have undergone many changes, ending up as the complex martial arts and geotourism centers they are now. The original monastery was founded as the first chan center specializing in Kung Foo and related martial arts. The monks always maintained an affectionate respect for the masters, who are still known by name. The tombs are generally well kept and are in a protected location.

Although the cemetery is the largest, not all the commemorative pagodas are located there. Other monasteries in the vicinity have pagodas as well. Pagodas also are not the only form of commemorative architecture. Steles may be found at various locations. The more famous historical figures warrant statuary or wall painting.

== Time window of the Pagoda Forest ==
The pagodas are dated by many methods. Each memorial bears an inscription—name and date—on stone or on an inscribed plaque. Each surviving inscription is thus a historical document. However, the plaques didn't always survive on the memorial. They were torn off or broken open to give access to the chamber inside, presumably an act of robbery, since it vandalized the pagoda. Political destruction would have done more damage to the structure. The surviving inscriptions are works of art. The calligraphy is in the style of the period, providing another means of period identification. A pagoda can be dated archaeologically by size, shape, material of the bricks and the content of the cement; architecturally by the ornamental features.

The first pagoda in the cemetery is that of Master Faru, which is dated to 689. As he had a long career at the monastery, it must be presumed to have begun much earlier. The date is in the Tang dynasty. All subsequent dynasties through the Qing dynasty are represented, covering a span of 618–1911. However, pagodas continue to be erected up to the present moment.

Some foreign monks are attested in the inscriptions: a Japanese monk dated 1339, an Indian monk dated 1564.

== Architecture of the pagodas ==
Distribution studies of the pagodas conclude that the great majority were constructed during the Ming dynasty (1368–1644) and the Qing dynasty (1644–1911). However, exact numbers depend on the acreage accepted as the size of the cemetery. There were never any permanent, fixed borders of the tract; rather, the monks simply decided to inter the master in some scenic land overlooking a stream to the west. Consequently, there is an area of highest concentration surrounded by circles of lower concentration, although some have chosen to see a pattern, such as a Chinese fan. Geosites, however, often require definite borders, which have been imposed upon the scene.

Official borders have been set by the Management Committee of the geopark and are published in an informational sign on-site. According to the sign, Pagoda Forest passed under state control on November 20, 1996. It comprises 14,000 m^{2} (3.5 acres) containing 248 markers, most pagodas. Its cemetery is 300 m from the west of the temple. For time periods it gives Tang, Wudai, Song, Jin, Yuan, Ming, Qing, and modern. Other sources give other figures. No matter what borders are considered, however, some pagodas will not be within them. (Note: Wang, using the Denfeng municipal records, agrees with the official acreage but counts 230 pagodas, 2 in Tang, 3 in Song, 10 in Jin, 20 in Juan, and the remaining 195 in Ming and Qing. In his choice of borders the earliest dates to 791.)

The pagodas are constructed of stone or brick.

== Membership in parks ==
The pagoda forest in Shaolin stands at the foot of Shaoshi Mountain and is one of the largest pagoda forests in China. It was named a National Scenic Spot in 1996.

Both the Shaolin Monastery and the Pagoda Forest were inscribed as a UNESCO World Heritage Site in 2010 as part of the "Historic Monuments of Dengfeng."

== See also ==
- Mount Song

== Reference bibliography ==
- Ren, Wei; He, Yan (2021). Historic Monuments of Mount Songshan. Shanghai: Shanghai Far East Publisher.
- Wang, Fang (2016). Geo-Architecture and Landscape in China's Geographic and Historic Context. Vol. 2: Geo-Architecture Inhabiting the Universe. Singapore: Springer Science+Business Media.
