= Futuci Pagoda =

Pagoda in China

Futuci Pagoda is a wooden pagoda that was built in Xuzhou during the Three Kingdoms period (220-280) in China.
