= Vieska =

Vieska is the name of two municipalities in Slovakia:

- Vieska, Dunajská Streda District
- Vieska, Veľký Krtíš District

== See also ==
- Alavieska, or Lower Vieska
- Ylivieska, or Upper Vieska
