= Veľké Zlievce =

Veľké Zlievce Felsőzellő
- Municipality
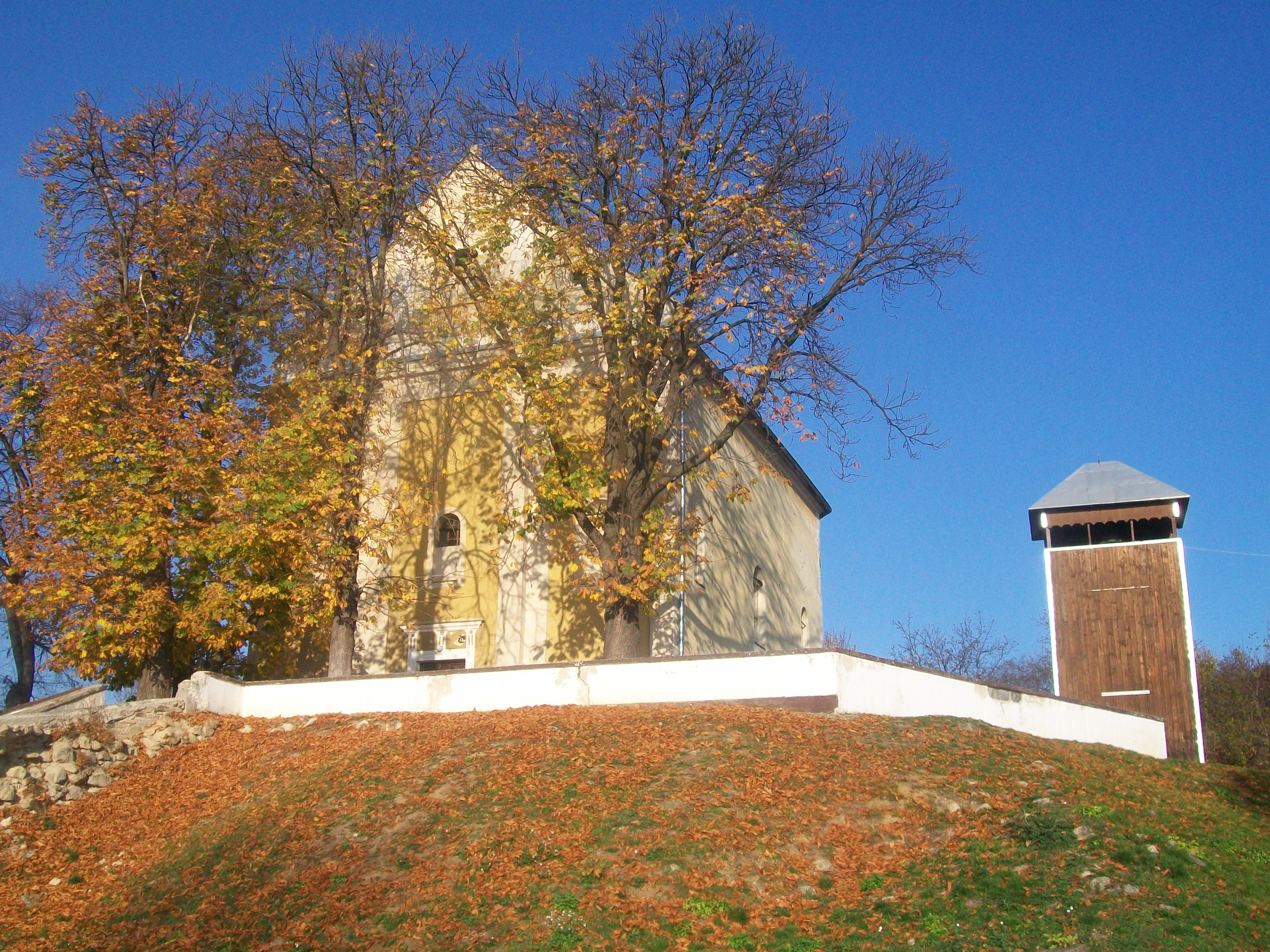
- Saint Nicholas Church

- Flag

- Location of Veľké Zlievce in the Banská Bystrica Region Location of Veľké Zlievce in Slovakia
- Coordinates: 48.20°N 19.45°E
- Country: Slovakia
- Region: Banská Bystrica Region
- District: Veľký Krtíš District
- First mentioned: 1248

Area
  - Total: 16.30 km^{2} (6.29 sq mi)
- Elevation: 210 m (690 ft)

Population (2025)
  - Total: 463
- Time zone: UTC+1 (CET)
  - Summer (DST): UTC+2 (CEST)
- Postal code: 991 23
- Area code: +421 47
- Vehicle registration plate (until 2022): VK
- Website: www.velkezlievce.sk

Veľké Zlievce (Hungarian: Felsőzellő) is a village and municipality in the Veľký Krtíš District of the Banská Bystrica Region of southern Slovakia.

== Geography ==
The municipality lies at an altitude of 210 metres (690 ft) and covers an area of 16.30 km^{2} (6.29 sq mi) (2025).

== Population ==
Population statistic (10 years)
Year	1995	2005	2015	2025
Count	474	517	507	463
Difference		+9.07%	−1.93%	−8.67%

Population statistic
Year	2024	2025
Count	470	463
Difference		−1.48%

It has a population of 463 people (31 December 2025).

=== Ethnicity ===
Census 2021 (1+ %)
Ethnicity	Number	Fraction
Slovak	446	89.55%
Hungarian	50	10.04%
Not found out	11	2.2%
Romani	8	1.6%
Total	498	

In year 2021 was 498 people by ethnicity 446 as Slovak, 50 as Hungarian, 11 as Not found out, 8 as Romani, 2 as Czech, 1 as Polish and 1 as Other.

Note on population: The difference values of population numbers in the table "Population statistic" and in the sections "Ethnicity" & "Religion" is caused by the use of various statistical methods.

=== Religion ===
Census 2021 (1+ %)
Religion	Number	Fraction
Roman Catholic Church	390	78.31%
None	73	14.66%
Evangelical Church	20	4.02%
Not found out	7	1.41%
Total	498	

In year 2021 was 498 people by religion 390 from Roman Catholic Church, 73 from None, 20 from Evangelical Church, 7 from Not found out, 3 from Greek Catholic Church, 2 from Calvinist Church, 1 from Christian Congregations in Slovakia, 1 from Other and 1 from United Methodist Church.
