= Bátorová =

Bátorová Bátorfalu
- Municipality
- Flag

- Location of Bátorová in the Banská Bystrica Region Location of Bátorová in Slovakia
- Coordinates: 48.13°N 19.28°E
- Country: Slovakia
- Region: Banská Bystrica Region
- District: Veľký Krtíš District
- First mentioned: 1478

Area
  - Total: 5.94 km^{2} (2.29 sq mi)
- Elevation: 159 m (522 ft)

Population (2025)
  - Total: 321
- Time zone: UTC+1 (CET)
  - Summer (DST): UTC+2 (CEST)
- Postal code: 991 26
- Area code: +421 47
- Vehicle registration plate (until 2022): VK
- Website: www.batorova.sk

Bátorová (Hungarian: Bátorfalu) is a village and municipality in the Veľký Krtíš District of the Banská Bystrica Region of southern Slovakia.

== Geography ==
The municipality lies at an altitude of 159 metres (522 ft) and covers an area of 5.94 km^{2} (2.29 sq mi) (2025).

== History ==
The village was first mentioned in 1478 (Bathor). It belonged to landowners Balogh, Koháry and Kubinyi. From 1938 to 1944 it belonged to Hungary.

== Genealogical resources ==
The records for genealogical research are available at the state archive "Statny Archiv in Banska Bystrica, Slovakia"

- Roman Catholic church records (births/marriages/deaths): 1699-1897 (parish B)
- Lutheran church records (births/marriages/deaths): 1728-1897 (parish B)

== Population ==
Population statistic (10 years)
Year	1995	2005	2015	2025
Count	406	377	384	321
Difference		−7.14%	+1.85%	−16.40%

Population statistic
Year	2024	2025
Count	328	321
Difference		−2.13%

It has a population of 321 people (31 December 2025).

=== Ethnicity ===
Census 2021 (1+ %)
Ethnicity	Number	Fraction
Slovak	311	88.1%
Hungarian	65	18.41%
Not found out	7	1.98%
Total	353	

In year 2021 was 353 people by ethnicity 311 as Slovak, 65 as Hungarian, 7 as Not found out, 1 as German, 1 as Other and 1 as Greek.

Note on population: The difference values of population numbers in the table "Population statistic" and in the sections "Ethnicity" & "Religion" is caused by the use of various statistical methods.

=== Religion ===
Census 2021 (1+ %)
Religion	Number	Fraction
Roman Catholic Church	294	83.29%
None	22	6.23%
Evangelical Church	16	4.53%
Not found out	5	1.42%
Christian Congregations in Slovakia	5	1.42%
Jehovah's Witnesses	4	1.13%
Total	353	

In year 2021 was 353 people by religion 294 from Roman Catholic Church, 22 from None, 16 from Evangelical Church, 5 from Not found out, 5 from Christian Congregations in Slovakia, 4 from Jehovah's Witnesses, 3 from Greek Catholic Church, 2 from Seventh-day Adventist Church, 1 from Calvinist Church and 1 from Other and not ascertained christian church.

== See also ==
- List of municipalities and towns in Slovakia
