= Závada, Veľký Krtíš District =

Závada Érújfalu
- Municipality
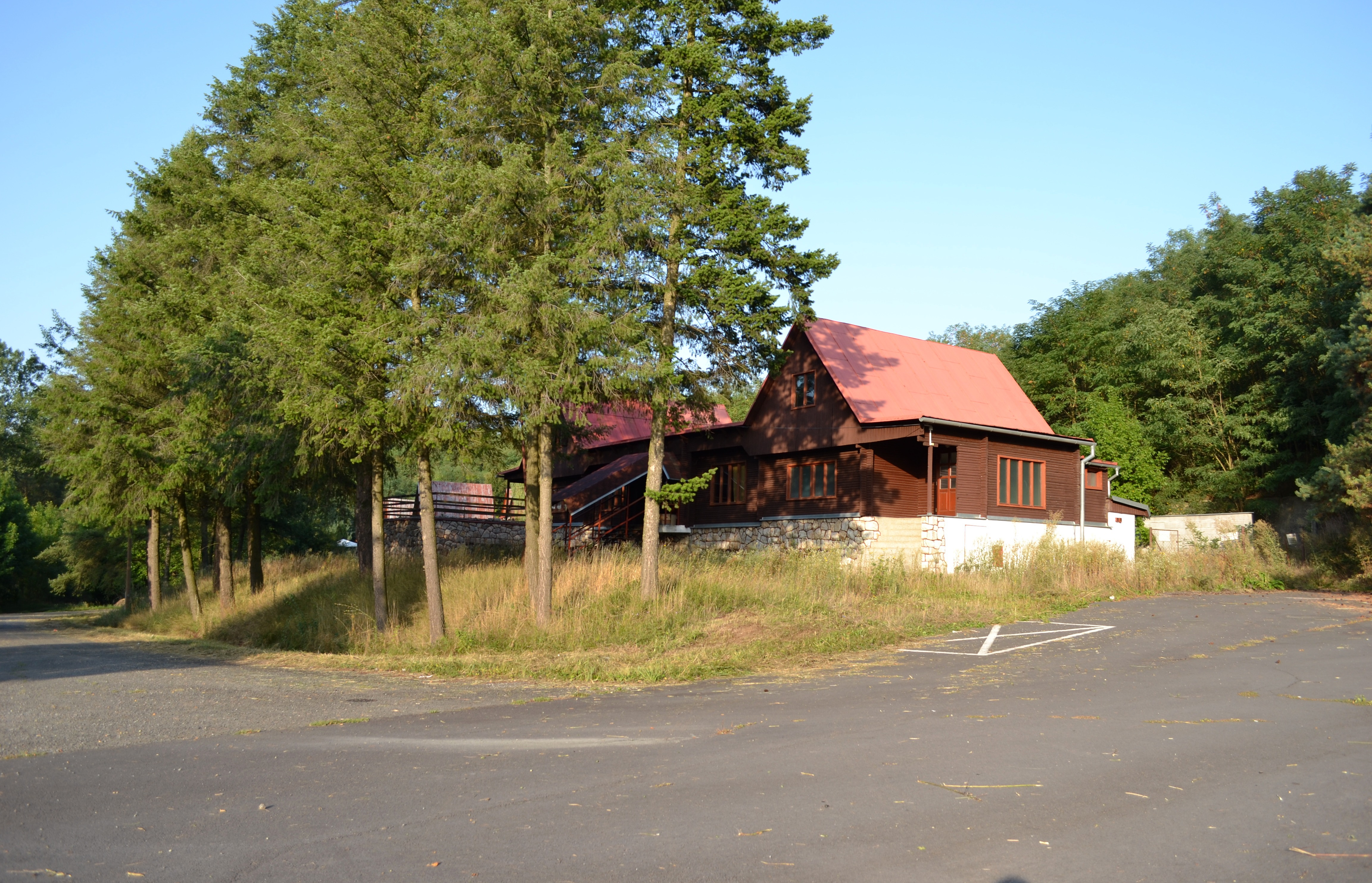

- Flag

- Location of Závada in the Banská Bystrica Region Location of Závada in Slovakia
- Coordinates: 48.30°N 19.49°E
- Country: Slovakia
- Region: Banská Bystrica Region
- District: Veľký Krtíš District
- First mentioned: 1393

Area
  - Total: 9.60 km^{2} (3.71 sq mi)
- Elevation: 218 m (715 ft)

Population (2025)
  - Total: 389
- Time zone: UTC+1 (CET)
  - Summer (DST): UTC+2 (CEST)
- Postal code: 991 21
- Area code: +421 47
- Vehicle registration plate (until 2022): VK
- Website: www.obeczavada.sk

Závada (Hungarian: Érújfalu) is a village and municipality in the Veľký Krtíš District of the Banská Bystrica Region of southern Slovakia.

== Population ==
Population statistic (10 years)
Year	1995	2005	2015	2025
Count	503	527	500	389
Difference		+4.77%	−5.12%	−22.2%

Population statistic
Year	2024	2025
Count	392	389
Difference		−0.76%

It has a population of 389 people (31 December 2025).

=== Ethnicity ===
Census 2021 (1+ %)
Ethnicity	Number	Fraction
Slovak	404	91.81%
Not found out	26	5.9%
Czech	6	1.36%
Ukrainian	5	1.13%
Total	440	

In year 2021 was 440 people by ethnicity 404 as Slovak, 26 as Not found out, 6 as Czech, 5 as Ukrainian, 2 as Romani, 2 as Hungarian, 1 as Italian, 1 as Polish and 1 as German.

Note on population: The difference values of population numbers in the table "Population statistic" and in the sections "Ethnicity" & "Religion" is caused by the use of various statistical methods.

=== Religion ===
Census 2021 (1+ %)
Religion	Number	Fraction
Roman Catholic Church	146	33.18%
Evangelical Church	144	32.73%
None	101	22.95%
Not found out	40	9.09%
Total	440	

In year 2021 was 440 people by religion 146 from Roman Catholic Church, 144 from Evangelical Church, 101 from None, 40 from Not found out, 4 from Greek Catholic Church, 2 from Other and not ascertained christian church, 1 from Paganism and natural spirituality, 1 from Other and 1 from Ad hoc movements.
