= Malá Čalomija =

Malá Čalomija Kiscsalomja
- Municipality
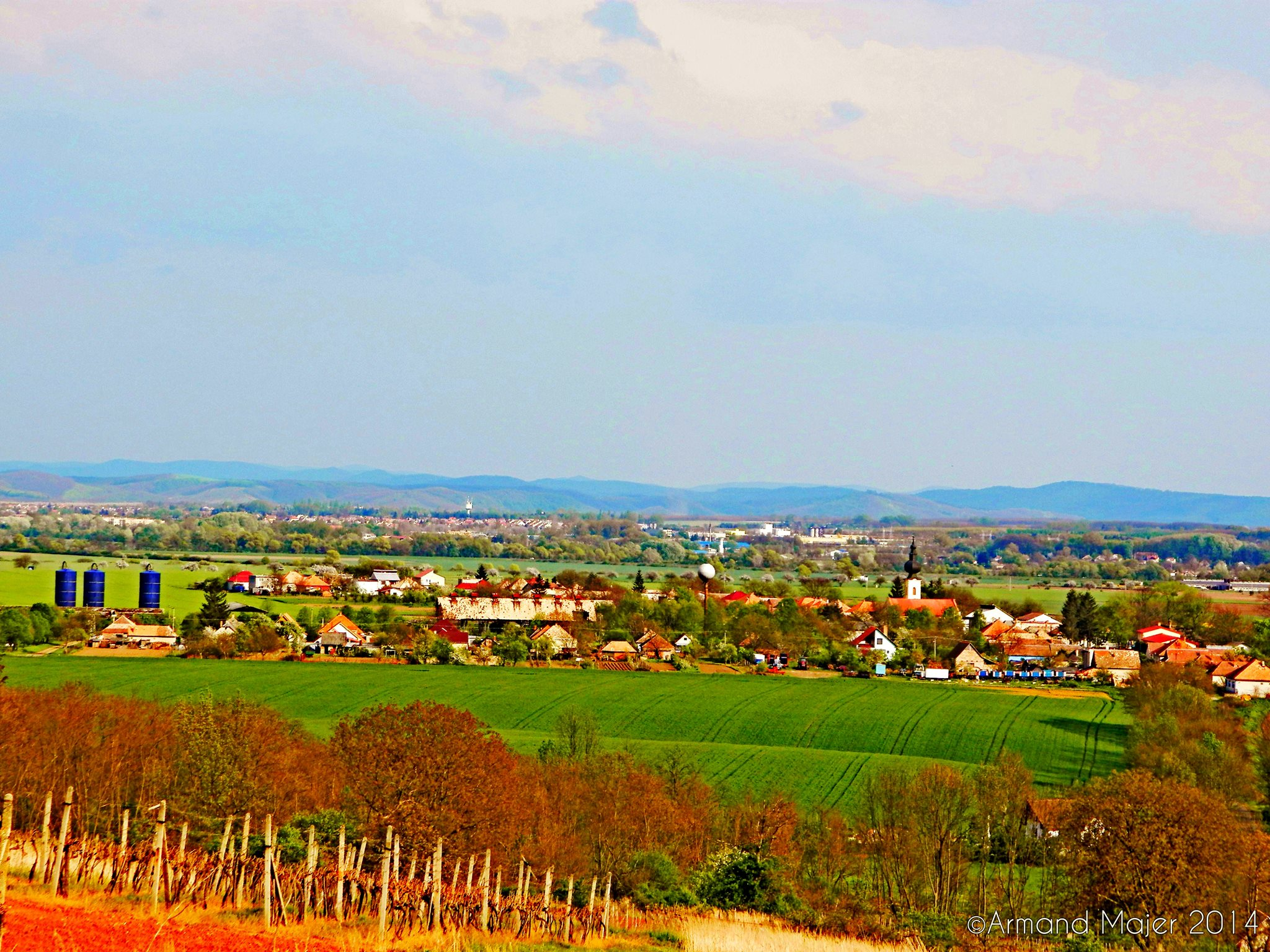

- Flag Coat of arms

- Location of Malá Čalomija in the Banská Bystrica Region Location of Malá Čalomija in Slovakia
- Coordinates: 48.08°N 19.23°E
- Country: Slovakia
- Region: Banská Bystrica Region
- District: Veľký Krtíš District
- First mentioned: 1342

Area
  - Total: 6.38 km^{2} (2.46 sq mi)
- Elevation: 151 m (495 ft)

Population (2025)
  - Total: 200
- Time zone: UTC+1 (CET)
  - Summer (DST): UTC+2 (CEST)
- Postal code: 991 08
- Area code: +421 47
- Vehicle registration plate (until 2022): VK
- Website: www.malacalomija.sk

Malá Čalomija (Hungarian: Kiscsalomja) is a village and municipality in the Veľký Krtíš District of the Banská Bystrica Region of southern Slovakia. Before 1919, when it was included in the newly formed nation of Czechoslovakia, the village was part of Hungary, where it was known as Kis Čalomija.

== Geography ==
The municipality lies at an altitude of 151 metres (495 ft) and covers an area of 6.38 km^{2} (2.46 sq mi) (2025).

== Population ==
Population statistic (10 years)
Year	1995	2005	2015	2025
Count	251	245	209	200
Difference		−2.39%	−14.69%	−4.30%

Population statistic
Year	2024	2025
Count	194	200
Difference		+3.09%

It has a population of 200 people (31 December 2025).

=== Ethnicity ===
Census 2021 (1+ %)
Ethnicity	Number	Fraction
Slovak	170	88.08%
Hungarian	28	14.5%
Not found out	7	3.62%
Total	193	

In year 2021 was 193 people by ethnicity 170 as Slovak, 28 as Hungarian, 7 as Not found out, 1 as Czech and 1 as Polish.

Note on population: The difference values of population numbers in the table "Population statistic" and in the sections "Ethnicity" & "Religion" is caused by the use of various statistical methods.

=== Religion ===
Census 2021 (1+ %)
Religion	Number	Fraction
Evangelical Church	94	48.7%
Roman Catholic Church	75	38.86%
None	10	5.18%
Not found out	6	3.11%
Seventh-day Adventist Church	6	3.11%
Total	193	

In year 2021 was 193 people by religion 94 from Evangelical Church, 75 from Roman Catholic Church, 10 from None, 6 from Not found out, 6 from Seventh-day Adventist Church, 1 from Greek Catholic Church and 1 from Ad hoc movements.
