= Kiarov =

Kiarov Ipolykér
- Municipality
- Flag

- Location of Kiarov in the Banská Bystrica Region Location of Kiarov in Slovakia
- Coordinates: 48.12°N 19.42°E
- Country: Slovakia
- Region: Banská Bystrica Region
- District: Veľký Krtíš District
- First mentioned: 1271

Area
  - Total: 9.00 km^{2} (3.47 sq mi)
- Elevation: 182 m (597 ft)

Population (2025)
  - Total: 256
- Time zone: UTC+1 (CET)
  - Summer (DST): UTC+2 (CEST)
- Postal code: 991 31
- Area code: +421 47
- Vehicle registration plate (until 2022): VK
- Website: www.kiarov.sk

Kiarov (Hungarian: Ipolykér) is both a village and municipality in the Veľký Krtíš District of the Banská Bystrica Region of southern Slovakia.

== Geography ==
The municipality lies at an altitude of 182 metres (597 ft) and covers an area of 9.00 km^{2} (3.47 sq mi) (2025).

== Population ==
Population statistic (10 years)
Year	1995	2005	2015	2025
Count	335	319	308	256
Difference		−4.77%	−3.44%	−16.88%

Population statistic
Year	2024	2025
Count	255	256
Difference		+0.39%

It has a population of 256 people (31 December 2025).

=== Ethnicity ===
Census 2021 (1+ %)
Ethnicity	Number	Fraction
Hungarian	170	62.27%
Slovak	122	44.68%
Romani	3	1.09%
Not found out	3	1.09%
Total	273	

In year 2021 was 273 people by ethnicity 170 as Hungarian, 122 as Slovak, 3 as Romani and 3 as Not found out.

Note on population: The difference values of population numbers in the table "Population statistic" and in the sections "Ethnicity" & "Religion" is caused by the use of various statistical methods.

=== Religion ===
Census 2021 (1+ %)
Religion	Number	Fraction
Roman Catholic Church	226	82.78%
None	26	9.52%
Evangelical Church	12	4.4%
Jehovah's Witnesses	4	1.47%
Not found out	3	1.1%
Total	273	

In year 2021 was 273 people by religion 226 from Roman Catholic Church, 26 from None, 12 from Evangelical Church, 4 from Jehovah's Witnesses, 3 from Not found out and 2 from Greek Catholic Church.

== Genealogical resources ==
The records for genealogical research are available at the state archive "Statny Archiv in Banska Bystrica, Slovakia"

- Roman Catholic church records (births/marriages/deaths): 1748-1919 (parish B)
- Lutheran church records (births/marriages/deaths): 1745-1931 (parish B)

== See also ==
- List of municipalities and towns in Slovakia
