= Záhorce =

Záhorce Erdőmeg
- Municipality
- Flag

- Location of Záhorce in the Banská Bystrica Region Location of Záhorce in Slovakia
- Coordinates: 48.12°N 19.35°E
- Country: Slovakia
- Region: Banská Bystrica Region
- District: Veľký Krtíš District
- First mentioned: 1236

Area
  - Total: 17.97 km^{2} (6.94 sq mi)
- Elevation: 154 m (505 ft)

Population (2025)
  - Total: 624
- Time zone: UTC+1 (CET)
  - Summer (DST): UTC+2 (CEST)
- Postal code: 991 06
- Area code: +421 47
- Vehicle registration plate (until 2022): VK
- Website: www.zahorce.sk

Záhorce (Hungarian: Erdőmeg) is a village and municipality in the Veľký Krtíš District of the Banská Bystrica Region of southern Slovakia.

Záhorce lies on the right bank of the river Ipeľ in the Krtíš valley . At present, the municipality of Záhorce includes in its territorial division also two former independent villages of Selešťany and Podlužany.

== Geography ==
The municipality lies at an altitude of 154 metres (505 ft) and covers an area of 17.97 km^{2} (6.94 sq mi) (2025).

== Population ==
Population statistic (10 years)
Year	1995	2005	2015	2025
Count	759	707	674	624
Difference		−6.85%	−4.66%	−7.41%

Population statistic
Year	2024	2025
Count	633	624
Difference		−1.42%

It has a population of 624 people (31 December 2025).

=== Ethnicity ===
Census 2021 (1+ %)
Ethnicity	Number	Fraction
Slovak	643	96.11%
Hungarian	22	3.28%
Not found out	13	1.94%
Total	669	

In year 2021 was 669 people by ethnicity 643 as Slovak, 22 as Hungarian, 13 as Not found out, 4 as Italian, 2 as Czech, 2 as Russian, 1 as Romani, 1 as Romanian and 1 as Other.

Note on population: The difference values of population numbers in the table "Population statistic" and in the sections "Ethnicity" & "Religion" is caused by the use of various statistical methods.

=== Religion ===
Census 2021 (1+ %)
Religion	Number	Fraction
Roman Catholic Church	287	42.9%
Evangelical Church	277	41.41%
None	79	11.81%
Not found out	10	1.49%
Greek Catholic Church	7	1.05%
Total	669	

In year 2021 was 669 people by religion 287 from Roman Catholic Church, 277 from Evangelical Church, 79 from None, 10 from Not found out, 7 from Greek Catholic Church, 3 from Other, 3 from Ad hoc movements, 1 from Calvinist Church, 1 from Other and not ascertained christian church and 1 from Czechoslovak Hussite Church.

== Monuments ==
The Evangelical church, a simple one-aisle tolerance building with a semi-circularly finished presbytery and a tower of 1781. After a fire in 1831, the church was restored, similarly in 1846. The interior is flat-ceilinged with a fabion. The altar is a simple Baroque column architecture from the 18th century. The church facades are smooth, the windows have a semi-circular finish. The tower, divided by pilasters, is finished with a bell helmet.
