= Pôtor =

Pôtor Nógrádszentpéter
- Municipality
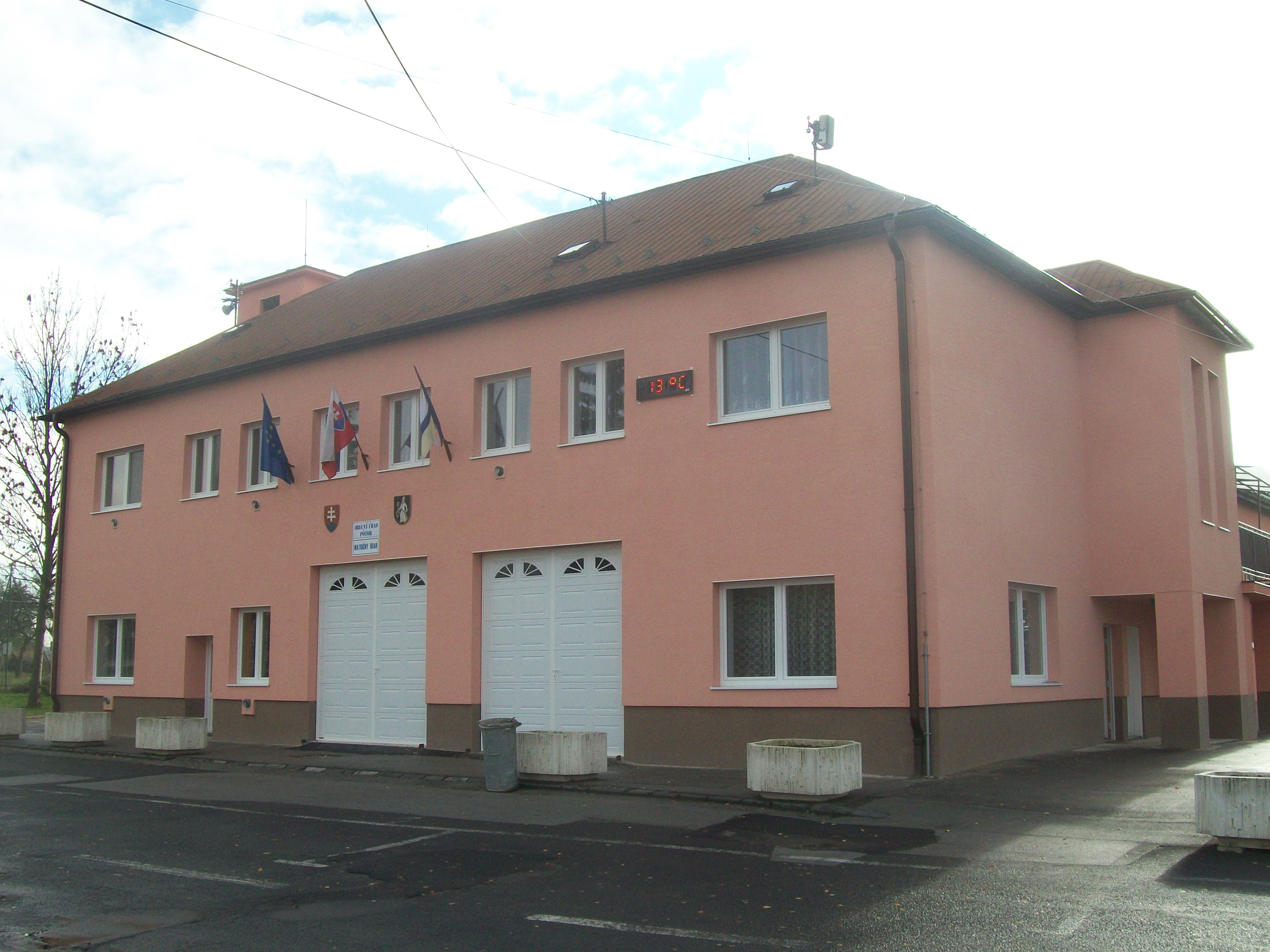
- Municipal Office in Pôtor

- Flag

- Location of Pôtor in the Banská Bystrica Region Location of Pôtor in Slovakia
- Coordinates: 48.23°N 19.43°E
- Country: Slovakia
- Region: Banská Bystrica Region
- District: Veľký Krtíš District
- First mentioned: 1332

Area
  - Total: 19.28 km^{2} (7.44 sq mi)
- Elevation: 206 m (676 ft)

Population (2025)
  - Total: 748
- Time zone: UTC+1 (CET)
  - Summer (DST): UTC+2 (CEST)
- Postal code: 991 03
- Area code: +421 47
- Vehicle registration plate (until 2022): VK
- Website: www.obecpotor.sk

Pôtor (Hungarian: Nógrádszentpéter) is a village and municipality in the Veľký Krtíš District of the Banská Bystrica Region of southern Slovakia.

== Geography ==
The municipality lies at an altitude of 206 metres (676 ft) and covers an area of 19.28 km^{2} (7.44 sq mi) (2025).

== Population ==
Population statistic (10 years)
Year	1995	2005	2015	2025
Count	778	831	827	748
Difference		+6.81%	−0.48%	−9.55%

Population statistic
Year	2024	2025
Count	747	748
Difference		+0.13%

It has a population of 748 people (31 December 2025).

=== Ethnicity ===
Census 2021 (1+ %)
Ethnicity	Number	Fraction
Slovak	733	96.57%
Not found out	15	1.97%
Romani	14	1.84%
Hungarian	11	1.44%
Total	759	

In year 2021 was 759 people by ethnicity 733 as Slovak, 15 as Not found out, 14 as Romani, 11 as Hungarian, 6 as Romanian, 4 as Russian, 3 as Other, 2 as Czech, 1 as Austrian, 1 as French and 1 as Bulgarian.

Note on population: The difference values of population numbers in the table "Population statistic" and in the sections "Ethnicity" & "Religion" is caused by the use of various statistical methods.

=== Religion ===
Census 2021 (1+ %)
Religion	Number	Fraction
Roman Catholic Church	329	43.35%
None	261	34.39%
Evangelical Church	143	18.84%
Not found out	10	1.32%
Total	759	

In year 2021 was 759 people by religion 329 from Roman Catholic Church, 261 from None, 143 from Evangelical Church, 10 from Not found out, 7 from Greek Catholic Church, 2 from Islam, 1 from Old Catholic Church, 1 from Calvinist Church, 1 from Eastern Orthodox Church, 1 from Christian Congregations in Slovakia, 1 from Other, 1 from Buddhism and 1 from Ad hoc movements.
