= Veľká Čalomija =

Veľká Čalomija Nagycsalomja
- Municipality
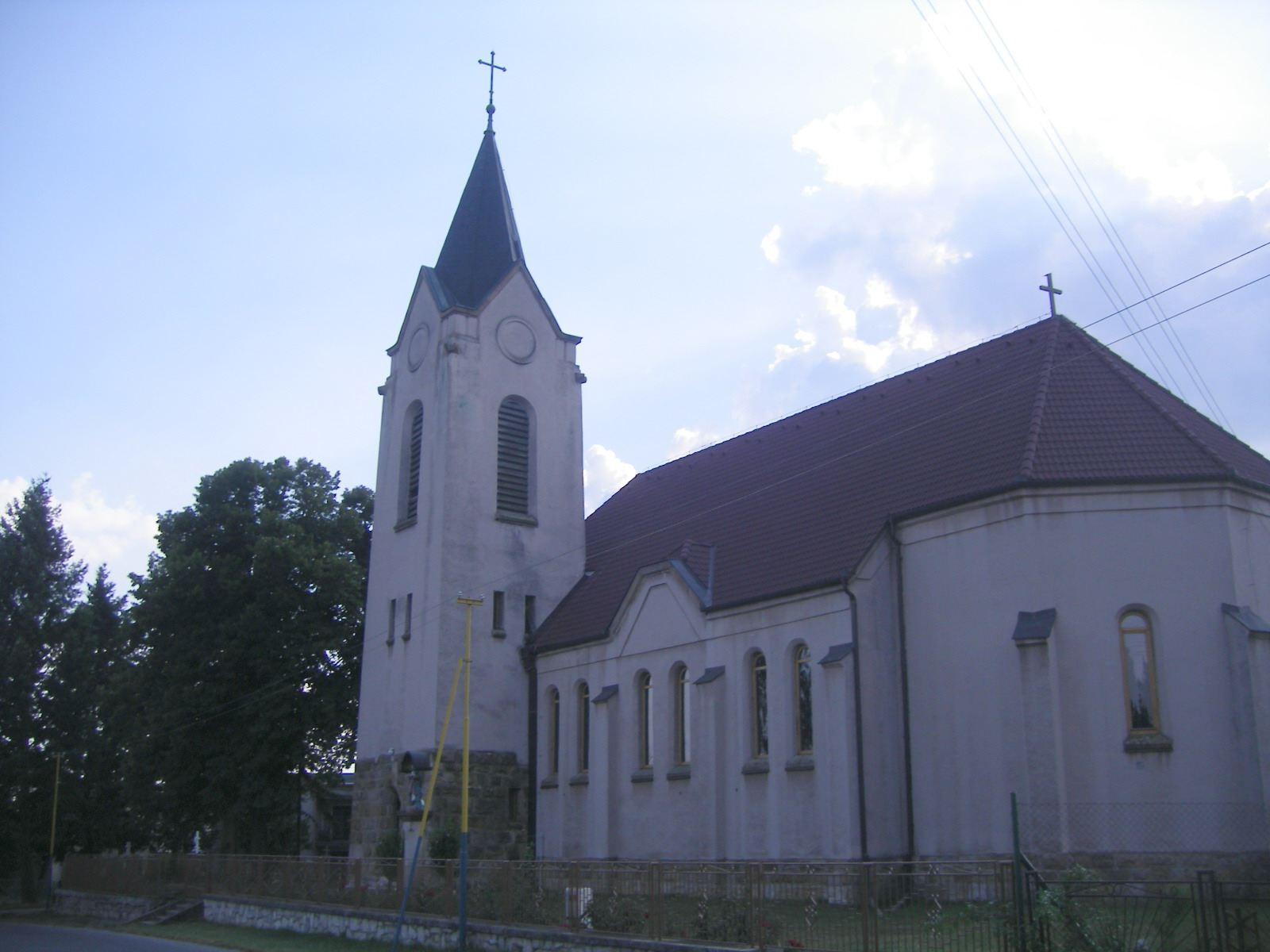

- Flag

- Location of Veľká Čalomija in the Banská Bystrica Region Location of Veľká Čalomija in Slovakia
- Coordinates: 48.07°N 19.20°E
- Country: Slovakia
- Region: Banská Bystrica Region
- District: Veľký Krtíš District
- First mentioned: 1244

Area
  - Total: 8.85 km^{2} (3.42 sq mi)
- Elevation: 140 m (460 ft)

Population (2025)
  - Total: 563
- Time zone: UTC+1 (CET)
  - Summer (DST): UTC+2 (CEST)
- Postal code: 991 09
- Area code: +421 47
- Vehicle registration plate (until 2022): VK
- Website: velkacalomija.sk/sk/home/

Veľká Čalomija (Hungarian: Nagycsalomja) is a village and municipality in the Veľký Krtíš District of the Banská Bystrica Region of southern Slovakia.

== Geography ==
The municipality lies at an altitude of 140 metres (460 ft) and covers an area of 8.85 km^{2} (3.42 sq mi) (2025).

== Population ==
Population statistic (10 years)
Year	1995	2005	2015	2025
Count	660	606	602	563
Difference		−8.18%	−0.66%	−6.47%

Population statistic
Year	2024	2025
Count	579	563
Difference		−2.76%

It has a population of 563 people (31 December 2025).

=== Ethnicity ===
Census 2021 (1+ %)
Ethnicity	Number	Fraction
Hungarian	357	62.85%
Slovak	238	41.9%
Not found out	25	4.4%
Total	568	

In year 2021 was 568 people by ethnicity 357 as Hungarian, 238 as Slovak, 25 as Not found out, 2 as Czech and 2 as Other.

Note on population: The difference values of population numbers in the table "Population statistic" and in the sections "Ethnicity" & "Religion" is caused by the use of various statistical methods.

=== Religion ===
Census 2021 (1+ %)
Religion	Number	Fraction
Roman Catholic Church	446	78.52%
None	55	9.68%
Evangelical Church	41	7.22%
Not found out	14	2.46%
Total	568	

In year 2021 was 568 people by religion 446 from Roman Catholic Church, 55 from None, 41 from Evangelical Church, 14 from Not found out, 3 from Calvinist Church, 3 from Seventh-day Adventist Church, 2 from Other, 2 from Greek Catholic Church, 1 from Jehovah's Witnesses and 1 from United Methodist Church.
