= Pravica =

Pravica Paróca
- Municipality
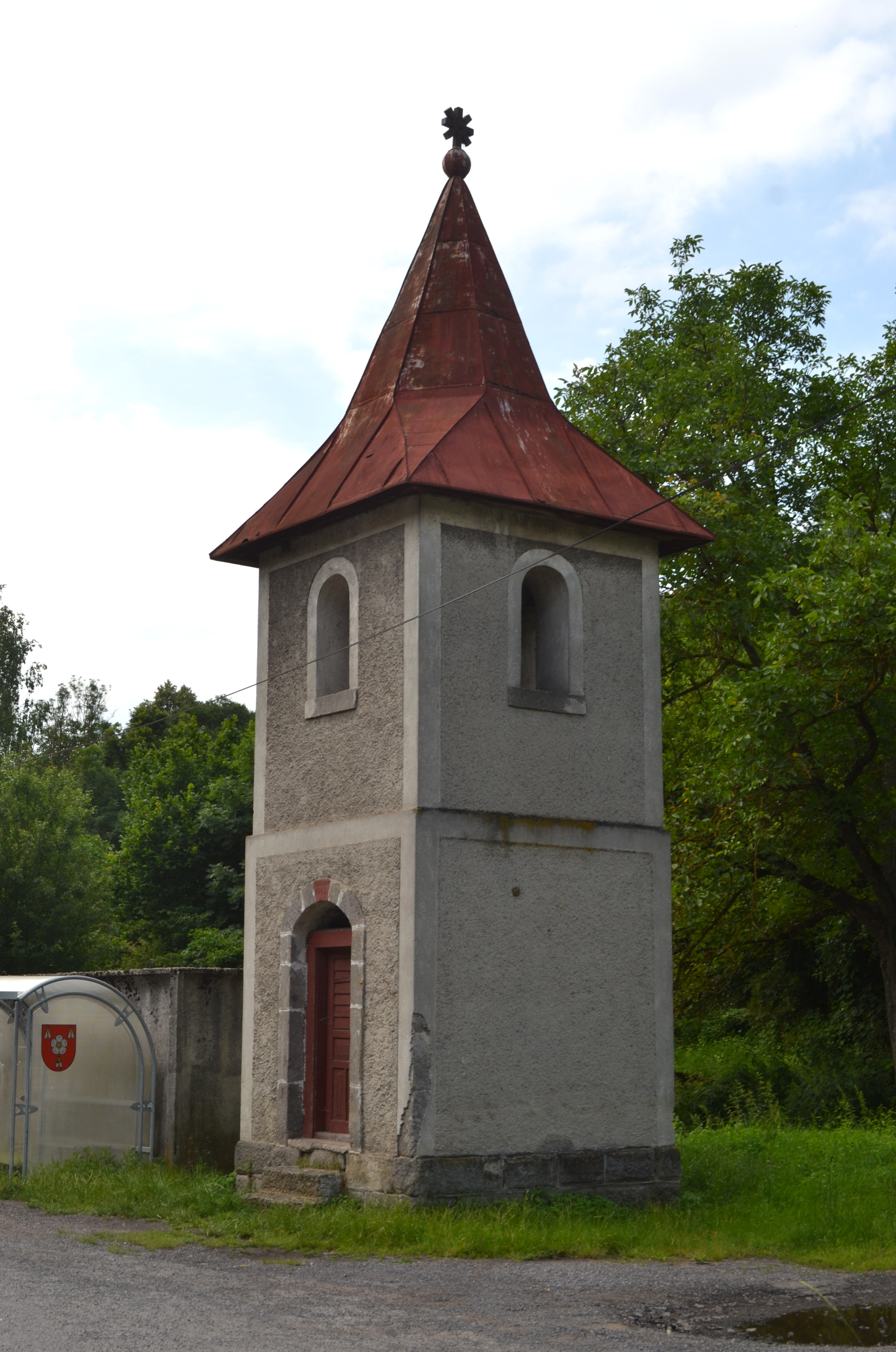

- Flag

- Location of Pravica in the Banská Bystrica Region Location of Pravica in Slovakia
- Coordinates: 48.32°N 19.47°E
- Country: Slovakia
- Region: Banská Bystrica Region
- District: Veľký Krtíš District
- First mentioned: 1271

Area
  - Total: 9.09 km^{2} (3.51 sq mi)
- Elevation: 356 m (1,168 ft)

Population (2025)
  - Total: 115
- Time zone: UTC+1 (CET)
  - Summer (DST): UTC+2 (CEST)
- Postal code: 991 21
- Area code: +421 47
- Vehicle registration plate (until 2022): VK

Pravica (Hungarian: Paróca) is a village and municipality in the Veľký Krtíš District of the Banská Bystrica Region of southern Slovakia.

== Geography ==
The municipality lies at an altitude of 356 metres (1,168 ft) and covers an area of 9.09 km^{2} (3.51 sq mi) (2025).

== Population ==
Population statistic (10 years)
Year	1995	2005	2015	2025
Count	95	102	117	115
Difference		+7.36%	+14.70%	−1.70%

Population statistic
Year	2024	2025
Count	117	115
Difference		−1.70%

It has a population of 115 people (31 December 2025).

=== Ethnicity ===
Census 2021 (1+ %)
Ethnicity	Number	Fraction
Slovak	116	98.3%
Romani	30	25.42%
Not found out	4	3.38%
Hungarian	3	2.54%
Total	118	

In year 2021 was 118 people by ethnicity 116 as Slovak, 30 as Romani, 4 as Not found out, 3 as Hungarian and 1 as German.

Note on population: The difference values of population numbers in the table "Population statistic" and in the sections "Ethnicity" & "Religion" is caused by the use of various statistical methods.

=== Religion ===
Census 2021 (1+ %)
Religion	Number	Fraction
Roman Catholic Church	48	40.68%
None	43	36.44%
Evangelical Church	24	20.34%
Total	118	

In year 2021 was 118 people by religion 48 from Roman Catholic Church, 43 from None, 24 from Evangelical Church, 1 from Paganism and natural spirituality, 1 from Not found out and 1 from Greek Catholic Church.
