= Veľké Straciny =

Veľké Straciny Nagyhalom
- Municipality
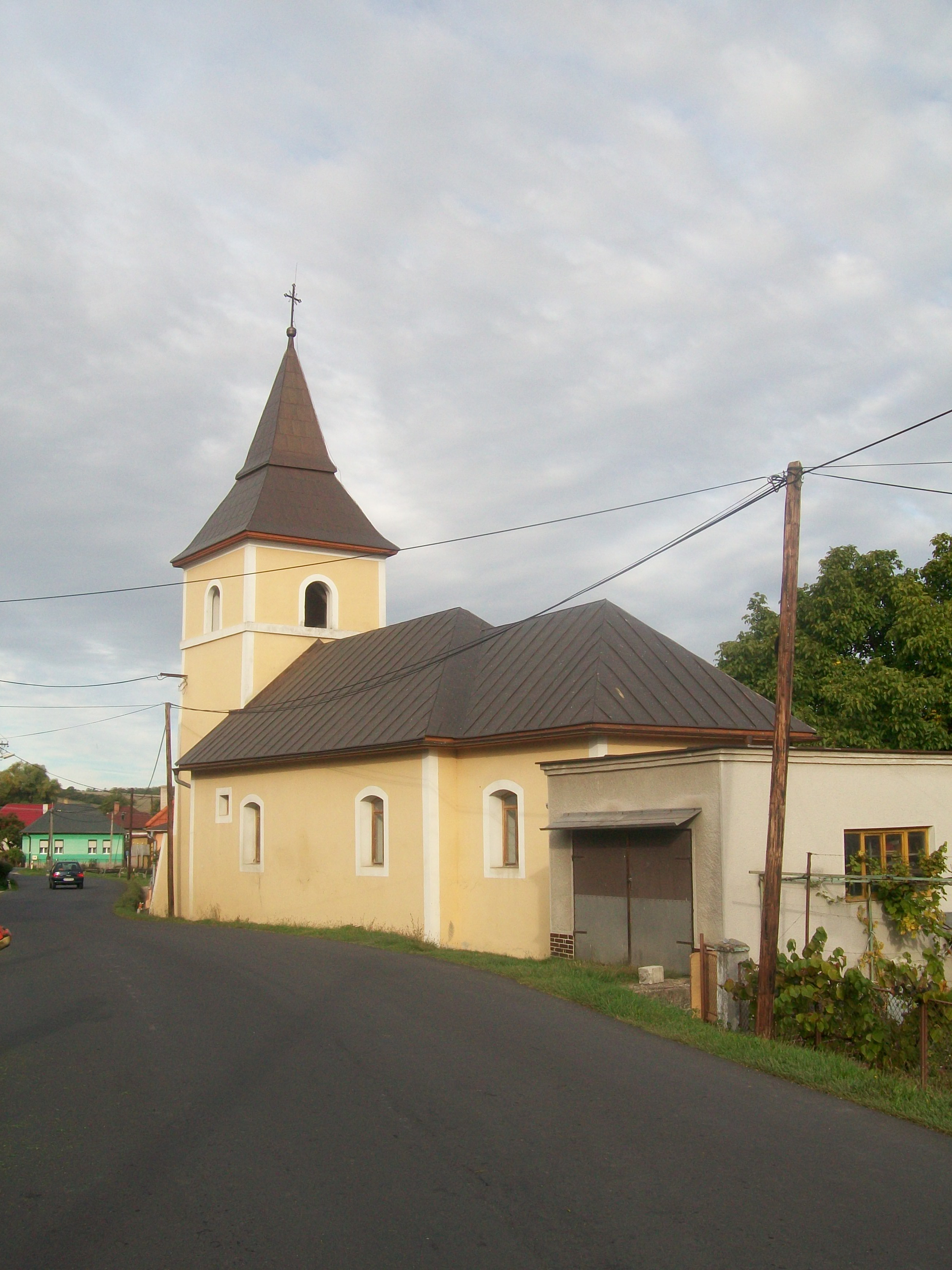
- Lutheran church in Veľké Straciny

- Flag

- Location of Veľké Straciny in the Banská Bystrica Region Location of Veľké Straciny in Slovakia
- Coordinates: 48.20°N 19.40°E
- Country: Slovakia
- Region: Banská Bystrica Region
- District: Veľký Krtíš District
- First mentioned: 1236

Area
  - Total: 6.27 km^{2} (2.42 sq mi)
- Elevation: 210 m (690 ft)

Population (2025)
  - Total: 173
- Time zone: UTC+1 (CET)
  - Summer (DST): UTC+2 (CEST)
- Postal code: 991 03
- Area code: +421 47
- Vehicle registration plate (until 2022): VK
- Website: www.velkestraciny.sk

Veľké Straciny (Hungarian: Nagyhalom) is a village and municipality in the Veľký Krtíš District of the Banská Bystrica Region of southern Slovakia. As of 31 December 2004, the municipality has an area of 6 km^{2} and a population density of 24 persons per km^{2}.

== Geography ==
The municipality lies at an altitude of 210 metres (690 ft) and covers an area of 6.27 km^{2} (2.42 sq mi) (2025).

== Population ==
Population statistic (10 years)
Year	1995	2005	2015	2025
Count	170	154	174	173
Difference		−9.41%	+12.98%	−0.57%

Population statistic
Year	2024	2025
Count	173	173
Difference		+0%

It has a population of 173 people (31 December 2025).

=== Ethnicity ===
Census 2021 (1+ %)
Ethnicity	Number	Fraction
Slovak	160	95.23%
Hungarian	4	2.38%
Not found out	3	1.78%
German	2	1.19%
Total	168	

In year 2021 was 168 people by ethnicity 160 as Slovak, 4 as Hungarian, 3 as Not found out, 2 as German and 1 as Russian.

Note on population: The difference values of population numbers in the table "Population statistic" and in the sections "Ethnicity" & "Religion" is caused by the use of various statistical methods.

=== Religion ===
Census 2021 (1+ %)
Religion	Number	Fraction
Evangelical Church	61	36.31%
None	51	30.36%
Roman Catholic Church	47	27.98%
Not found out	3	1.79%
Calvinist Church	2	1.19%
Other	2	1.19%
Total	168	

In year 2021 was 168 people by religion 61 from Evangelical Church, 51 from None, 47 from Roman Catholic Church, 3 from Not found out, 2 from Calvinist Church, 2 from Other, 1 from Greek Catholic Church and 1 from Ad hoc movements.
