= Slovenské Kľačany =

Slovenské Kľačany Tótkelecsény
- Municipality
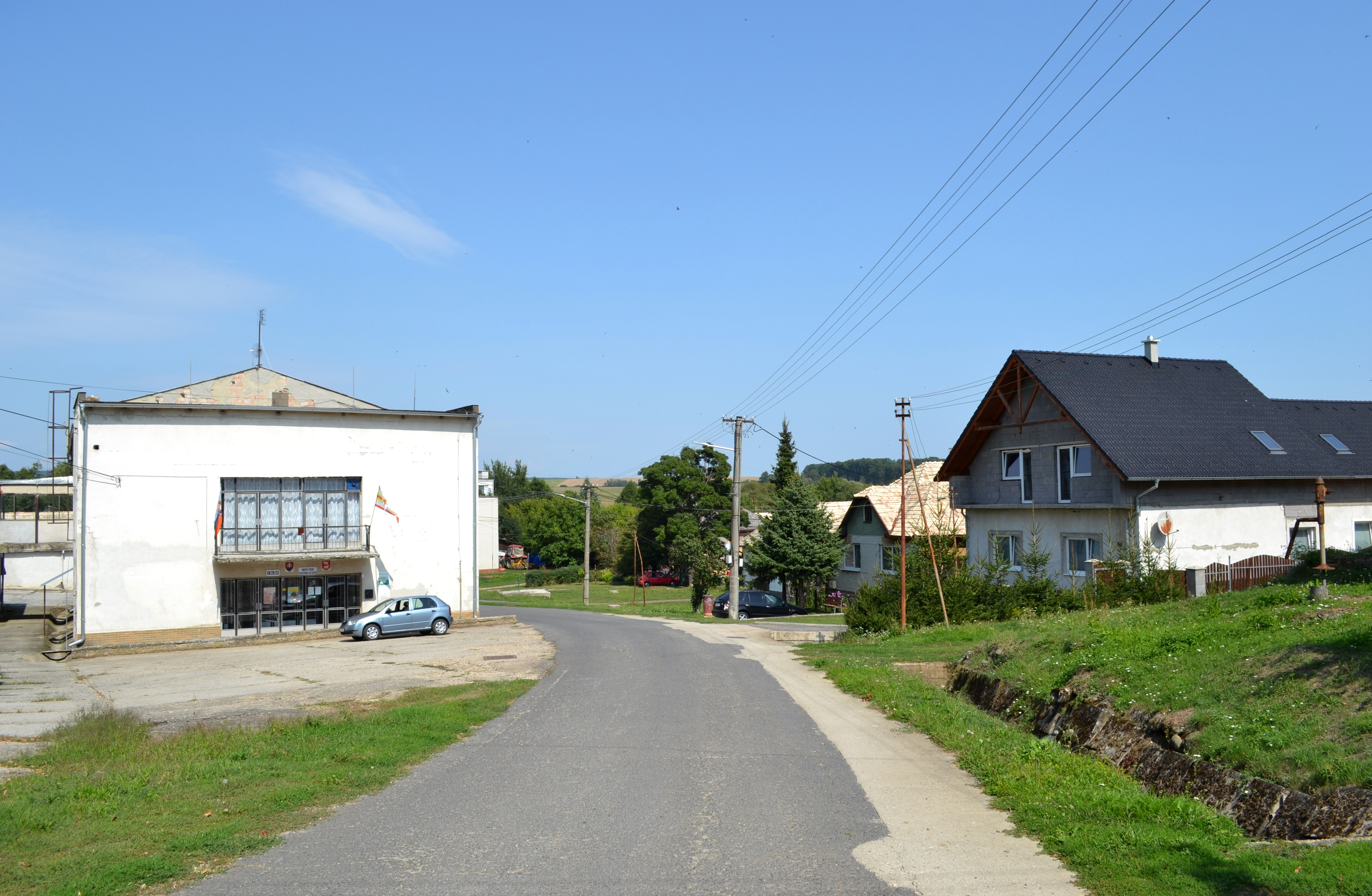

- Flag

- Location of Slovenské Kľačany in the Banská Bystrica Region Location of Slovenské Kľačany in Slovakia
- Coordinates: 48.27°N 19.45°E
- Country: Slovakia
- Region: Banská Bystrica Region
- District: Veľký Krtíš District
- First mentioned: 1379

Area
  - Total: 9.13 km^{2} (3.53 sq mi)
- Elevation: 200 m (660 ft)

Population (2025)
  - Total: 178
- Time zone: UTC+1 (CET)
  - Summer (DST): UTC+2 (CEST)
- Postal code: 991 02
- Area code: +421 47
- Vehicle registration plate (until 2022): VK
- Website: www.slovenskeklacany.sk

Slovenské Kľačany (Hungarian: Tótkelecsény) is a village and municipality in the Veľký Krtíš District of the Banská Bystrica Region of southern Slovakia.

== Geography ==
The municipality lies at an altitude of 200 metres (660 ft) and covers an area of 9.13 km^{2} (3.53 sq mi) (2025).

== Population ==
Population statistic (10 years)
Year	1995	2005	2015	2025
Count	170	165	161	178
Difference		−2.94%	−2.42%	+10.55%

Population statistic
Year	2024	2025
Count	176	178
Difference		+1.13%

It has a population of 178 people (31 December 2025).

=== Ethnicity ===
Census 2021 (1+ %)
Ethnicity	Number	Fraction
Slovak	162	95.29%
Romani	7	4.11%
Hungarian	3	1.76%
Total	170	

In year 2021 was 170 people by ethnicity 162 as Slovak, 7 as Romani, 3 as Hungarian and 1 as Czech.

Note on population: The difference values of population numbers in the table "Population statistic" and in the sections "Ethnicity" & "Religion" is caused by the use of various statistical methods.

=== Religion ===
Census 2021 (1+ %)
Religion	Number	Fraction
Roman Catholic Church	85	50%
None	46	27.06%
Evangelical Church	26	15.29%
Not found out	7	4.12%
Greek Catholic Church	6	3.53%
Total	170	

In year 2021 was 170 people by religion 85 from Roman Catholic Church, 46 from None, 26 from Evangelical Church, 7 from Not found out and 6 from Greek Catholic Church.
