= Obeckov =

Obeckov Ebeck
- Municipality
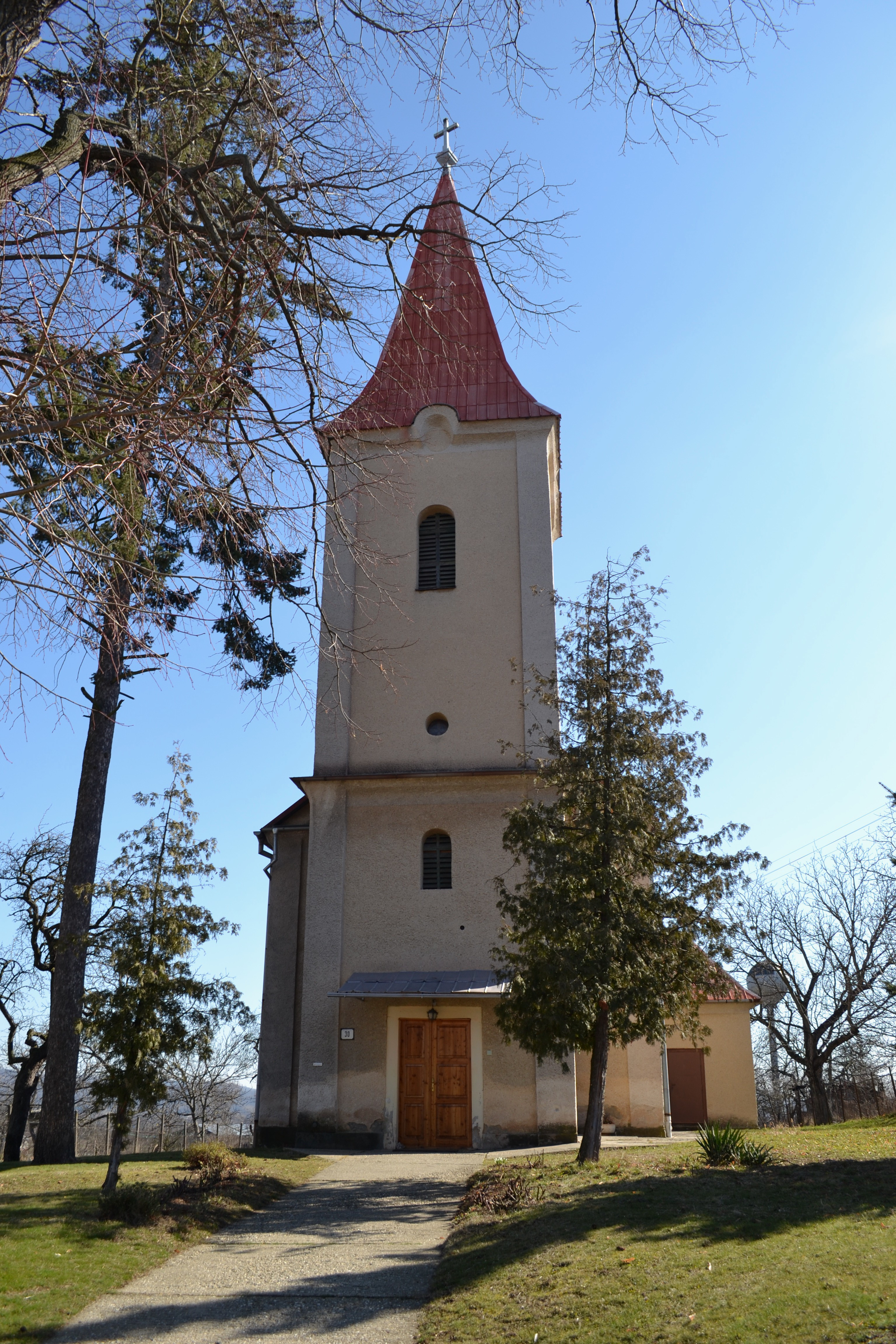
- Church of St. John the Baptist

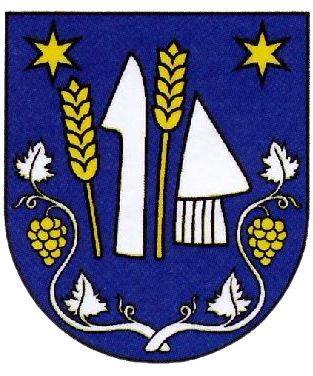
- Flag Coat of arms

- Location of Obeckov in the Banská Bystrica Region Location of Obeckov in Slovakia
- Coordinates: 48.17°N 19.33°E
- Country: Slovakia
- Region: Banská Bystrica Region
- District: Veľký Krtíš District
- First mentioned: 1323

Area
  - Total: 10.79 km^{2} (4.17 sq mi)
- Elevation: 170 m (560 ft)

Population (2025)
  - Total: 442
- Time zone: UTC+1 (CET)
  - Summer (DST): UTC+2 (CEST)
- Postal code: 991 05
- Area code: +421 47
- Vehicle registration plate (until 2022): VK
- Website: www.obeckov.sk

Obeckov (Hungarian: Ebeck) is a village and municipality in the Veľký Krtíš District of the Banská Bystrica Region of southern Slovakia.

== Geography ==
The municipality lies at an altitude of 170 metres (560 ft) and covers an area of 10.79 km^{2} (4.17 sq mi) (2025).

== Population ==
Population statistic (10 years)
Year	1995	2005	2015	2025
Count	428	474	482	442
Difference		+10.74%	+1.68%	−8.29%

Population statistic
Year	2024	2025
Count	433	442
Difference		+2.07%

It has a population of 442 people (31 December 2025).

=== Ethnicity ===
Census 2021 (1+ %)
Ethnicity	Number	Fraction
Slovak	422	95.04%
Not found out	20	4.5%
Hungarian	8	1.8%
Total	444	

In year 2021 was 444 people by ethnicity 422 as Slovak, 20 as Not found out, 8 as Hungarian, 4 as Romani, 2 as Czech, 1 as Rusyn, 1 as Other and 1 as Croatian.

Note on population: The difference values of population numbers in the table "Population statistic" and in the sections "Ethnicity" & "Religion" is caused by the use of various statistical methods.

=== Religion ===
Census 2021 (1+ %)
Religion	Number	Fraction
Roman Catholic Church	348	78.38%
Evangelical Church	32	7.21%
None	26	5.86%
Not found out	16	3.6%
Christian Congregations in Slovakia	13	2.93%
Total	444	

In year 2021 was 444 people by religion 348 from Roman Catholic Church, 32 from Evangelical Church, 26 from None, 16 from Not found out, 13 from Christian Congregations in Slovakia, 3 from Eastern Orthodox Church, 3 from Greek Catholic Church, 1 from Calvinist Church, 1 from United Methodist Church and 1 from Baptists Church.
