= Veľký Lom =

Veľký Lom Nagylám
- Municipality
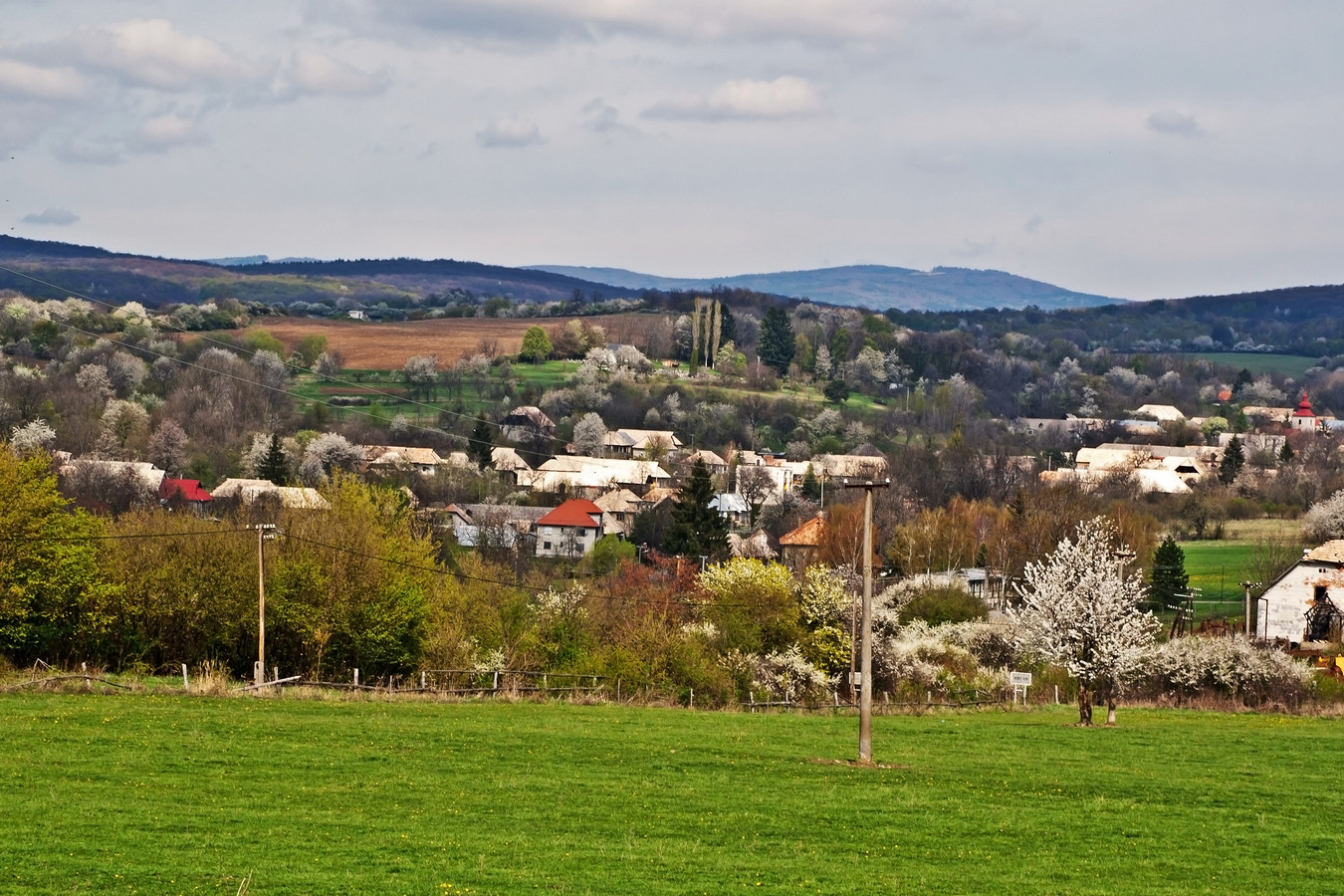

- Flag Coat of arms

- Location of Veľký Lom in the Banská Bystrica Region Location of Veľký Lom in Slovakia
- Coordinates: 48.33°N 19.38°E
- Country: Slovakia
- Region: Banská Bystrica Region
- District: Veľký Krtíš District
- First mentioned: 1573

Area
  - Total: 10.63 km^{2} (4.10 sq mi)
- Elevation: 418 m (1,371 ft)

Population (2025)
  - Total: 128
- Time zone: UTC+1 (CET)
  - Summer (DST): UTC+2 (CEST)
- Postal code: 991 01
- Area code: +421 47
- Vehicle registration plate (until 2022): VK
- Website: www.velkylom.sk

Veľký Lom (Hungarian: Nagylám) is a village and municipality in the Veľký Krtíš District of the Banská Bystrica Region of southern Slovakia.

== Geography ==
The municipality lies at an altitude of 418 metres (1,371 ft) and covers an area of 10.63 km^{2} (4.10 sq mi) (2025).

== Population ==
Population statistic (10 years)
Year	1995	2005	2015	2025
Count	242	214	185	128
Difference		−11.57%	−13.55%	−30.81%

Population statistic
Year	2024	2025
Count	132	128
Difference		−3.03%

It has a population of 128 people (31 December 2025).

=== Ethnicity ===
Census 2021 (1+ %)
Ethnicity	Number	Fraction
Slovak	124	89.85%
Not found out	10	7.24%
Ukrainian	5	3.62%
Total	138	

In year 2021 was 138 people by ethnicity 124 as Slovak, 10 as Not found out, 5 as Ukrainian and 1 as Romani.

Note on population: The difference values of population numbers in the table "Population statistic" and in the sections "Ethnicity" & "Religion" is caused by the use of various statistical methods.

=== Religion ===
Census 2021 (1+ %)
Religion	Number	Fraction
Evangelical Church	64	46.38%
Roman Catholic Church	40	28.99%
None	16	11.59%
Not found out	8	5.8%
Eastern Orthodox Church	5	3.62%
Other	3	2.17%
Total	138	

In year 2021 was 138 people by religion 64 from Evangelical Church, 40 from Roman Catholic Church, 16 from None, 8 from Not found out, 5 from Eastern Orthodox Church, 3 from Other, 1 from Seventh-day Adventist Church and 1 from Baptists Church.
