= Ďurkovce =

Ďurkovce Gyürki
- Municipality
- Flag

- Location of Ďurkovce in the Banská Bystrica Region Location of Ďurkovce in Slovakia
- Coordinates: 48.13°N 19.18°E
- Country: Slovakia
- Region: Banská Bystrica Region
- District: Veľký Krtíš District
- First mentioned: 1262

Area
  - Total: 4.93 km^{2} (1.90 sq mi)
- Elevation: 184 m (604 ft)

Population (2025)
  - Total: 109
- Time zone: UTC+1 (CET)
  - Summer (DST): UTC+2 (CEST)
- Postal code: 991 27
- Area code: +421 47
- Vehicle registration plate (until 2022): VK
- Website: www.durkovce.sk

Ďurkovce (Hungarian: Gyürki) is a village and municipality in the Veľký Krtíš District of the Banská Bystrica Region of southern Slovakia.

== Geography ==
The municipality lies at an altitude of 184 metres (604 ft) and covers an area of 4.93 km^{2} (1.90 sq mi) (2025).

== History ==
In historical records, the village was first mentioned in 1262 (1262 Gurky, 1351 Gyiörk, 1381 Gyurk, Gyurki). In 1351, it belonged to Vinica town and, successively, to nobles Gyürkiy, a local feudatory family, Teleky and Majthény. In the 16th century, it was destroyed by Turks. From 1938 to 1945, it belonged to Hungary.

== Genealogical resources ==
The records for genealogical research are available at the state archive "Statny Archiv in Banska Bystrica, Slovakia"

- Roman Catholic church records (births/marriages/deaths): 1735-1904 (parish B)

== Population ==
Population statistic (10 years)
Year	1995	2005	2015	2025
Count	146	125	142	109
Difference		−14.38%	+13.6%	−23.23%

Population statistic
Year	2024	2025
Count	112	109
Difference		−2.67%

It has a population of 109 people (31 December 2025).

=== Ethnicity ===
Census 2021 (1+ %)
Ethnicity	Number	Fraction
Slovak	71	56.34%
Hungarian	53	42.06%
Romani	8	6.34%
Not found out	3	2.38%
Total	126	

In year 2021 was 126 people by ethnicity 71 as Slovak, 53 as Hungarian, 8 as Romani, 3 as Not found out and 1 as Romanian.

Note on population: The difference values of population numbers in the table "Population statistic" and in the sections "Ethnicity" & "Religion" is caused by the use of various statistical methods.

=== Religion ===
Census 2021 (1+ %)
Religion	Number	Fraction
Roman Catholic Church	95	75.4%
None	18	14.29%
Greek Catholic Church	3	2.38%
Evangelical Church	3	2.38%
Not found out	2	1.59%
Christian Congregations in Slovakia	2	1.59%
Total	126	

In year 2021 was 126 people by religion 95 from Roman Catholic Church, 18 from None, 3 from Greek Catholic Church, 3 from Evangelical Church, 2 from Not found out, 2 from Christian Congregations in Slovakia, 1 from Calvinist Church, 1 from Other and not ascertained christian church and 1 from United Methodist Church.

== See also ==
- List of municipalities and towns in Slovakia
