= Malý Krtíš =

Malý Krtíš Kiskürtös
- Municipality
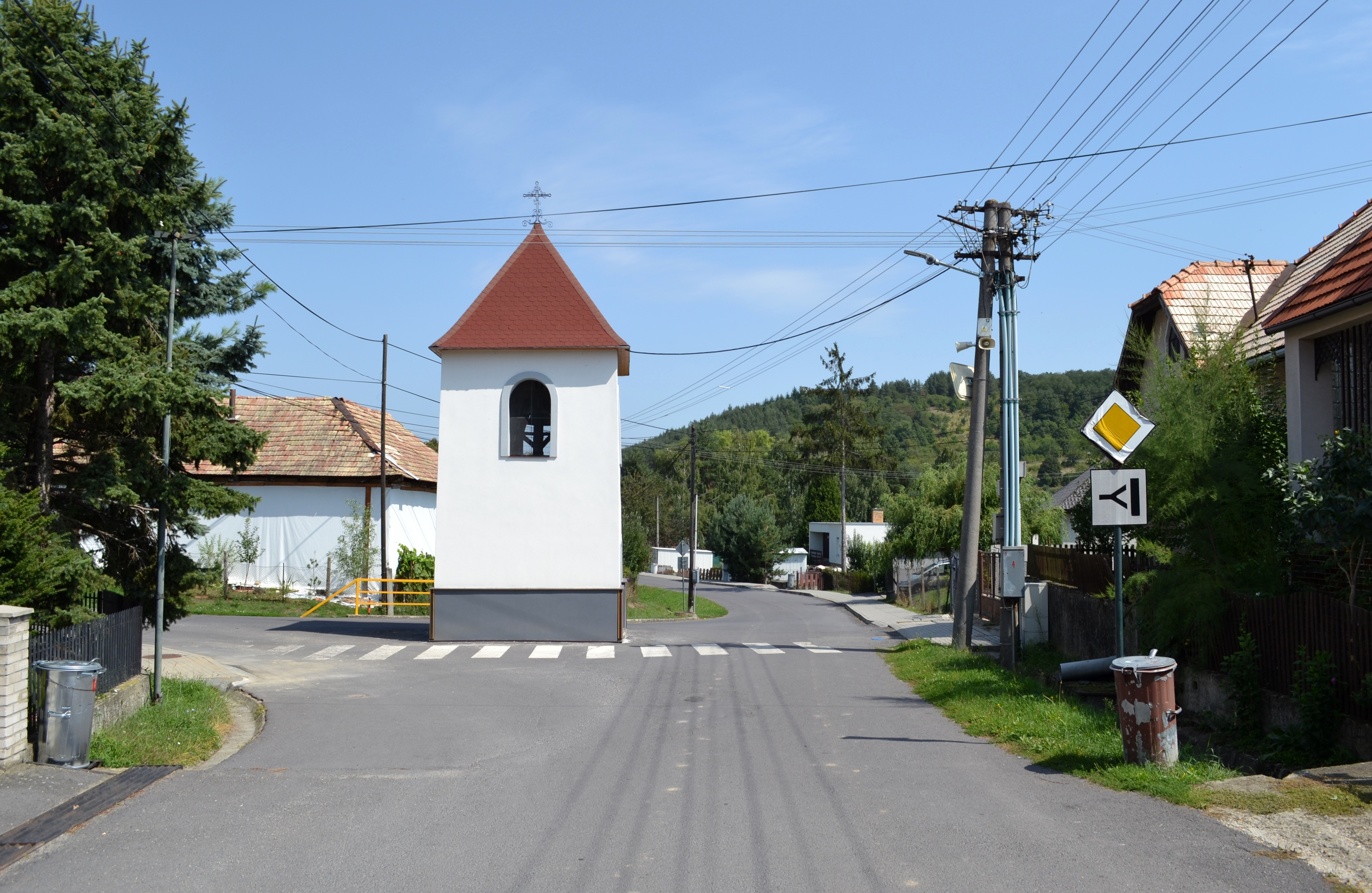

- Flag

- Location of Malý Krtíš in the Banská Bystrica Region Location of Malý Krtíš in Slovakia
- Coordinates: 48.18°N 19.37°E
- Country: Slovakia
- Region: Banská Bystrica Region
- District: Veľký Krtíš District
- First mentioned: 1251

Area
  - Total: 5.40 km^{2} (2.08 sq mi)
- Elevation: 173 m (568 ft)

Population (2025)
  - Total: 455
- Time zone: UTC+1 (CET)
  - Summer (DST): UTC+2 (CEST)
- Postal code: 990 01
- Area code: +421 47
- Vehicle registration plate (until 2022): VK
- Website: www.malykrtis.sk

Malý Krtíš (Hungarian: Kiskürtös) is a village and municipality in the Veľký Krtíš District of the Banská Bystrica Region of southern Slovakia.

== Geography ==
The municipality lies at an altitude of 173 metres (568 ft) and covers an area of 5.40 km^{2} (2.08 sq mi) (2025).

== Population ==
Population statistic (10 years)
Year	1995	2005	2015	2025
Count	437	449	532	455
Difference		+2.74%	+18.48%	−14.47%

Population statistic
Year	2024	2025
Count	465	455
Difference		−2.15%

It has a population of 455 people (31 December 2025).

=== Ethnicity ===
Census 2021 (1+ %)
Ethnicity	Number	Fraction
Slovak	470	95.91%
Not found out	15	3.06%
Hungarian	9	1.83%
Total	490	

In year 2021 was 490 people by ethnicity 470 as Slovak, 15 as Not found out, 9 as Hungarian, 4 as Romani, 3 as French, 2 as Czech and 1 as Italian.

Note on population: The difference values of population numbers in the table "Population statistic" and in the sections "Ethnicity" & "Religion" is caused by the use of various statistical methods.

=== Religion ===
Census 2021 (1+ %)
Religion	Number	Fraction
Roman Catholic Church	251	51.22%
Evangelical Church	128	26.12%
None	84	17.14%
Not found out	12	2.45%
Greek Catholic Church	9	1.84%
Total	490	

In year 2021 was 490 people by religion 251 from Roman Catholic Church, 128 from Evangelical Church, 84 from None, 12 from Not found out, 9 from Greek Catholic Church, 2 from Other and not ascertained christian church, 1 from Eastern Orthodox Church, 1 from Other, 1 from Buddhism and 1 from Ad hoc movements.
