= Dolinka, Slovakia =

Village and municipality in Slovakia

Dolinka Inám
- Municipality
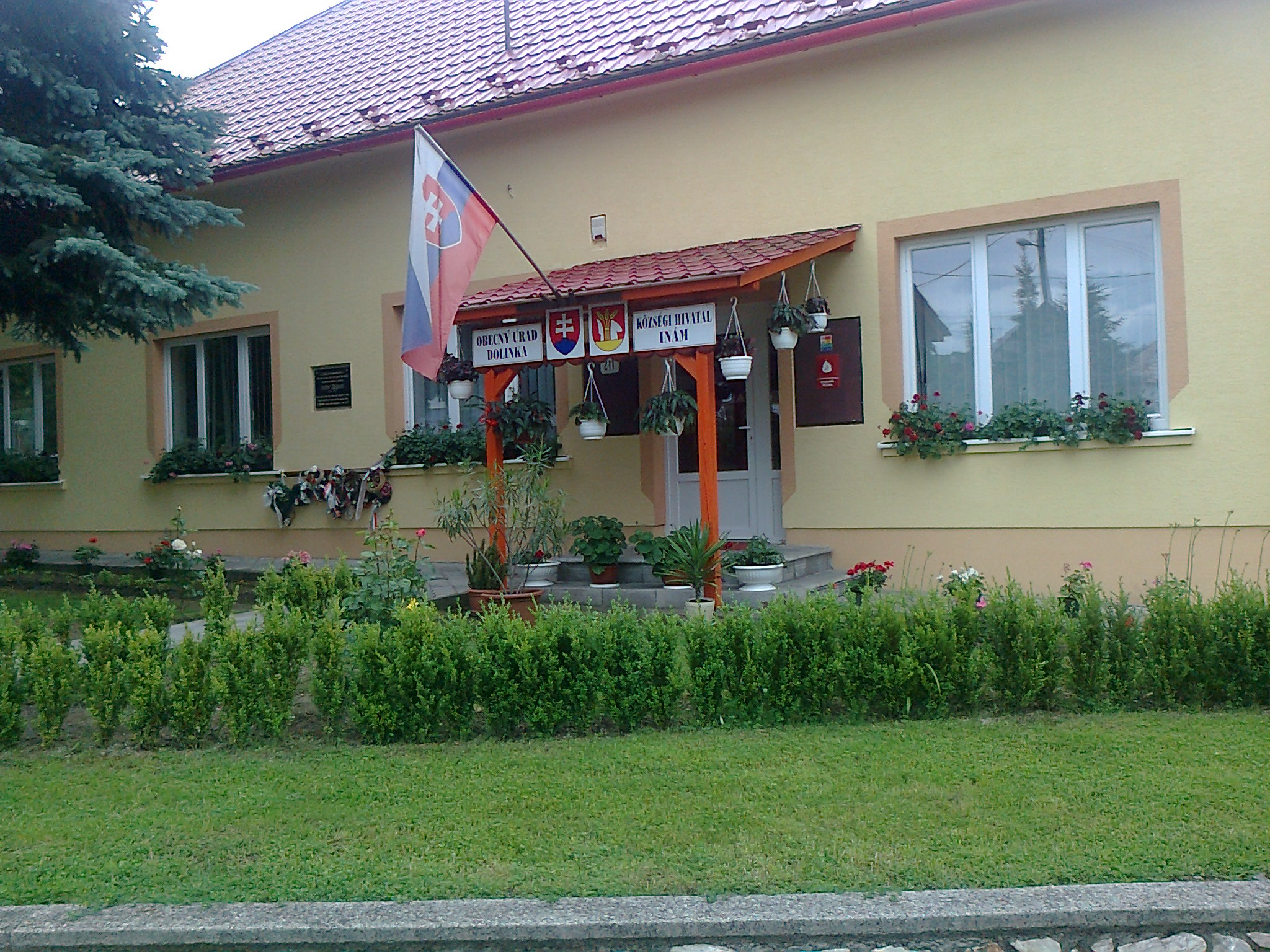
- Municipality Office

- Flag

- Location of Dolinka in the Banská Bystrica Region Location of Dolinka in Slovakia
- Coordinates: 48.09°N 19.15°E
- Country: Slovakia
- Region: Banská Bystrica Region
- District: Veľký Krtíš District
- First mentioned: 1260

Area
  - Total: 7.29 km^{2} (2.81 sq mi)
- Elevation: 153 m (502 ft)

Population (2025)
  - Total: 431
- Time zone: UTC+1 (CET)
  - Summer (DST): UTC+2 (CEST)
- Postal code: 991 28
- Area code: +421 47
- Vehicle registration plate (until 2022): VK
- Website: www.dolinka.org/sk/

Dolinka (Hungarian: Inám) is a village and municipality in the Veľký Krtíš District of the Banská Bystrica Region of southern Slovakia.

== Geography ==
The municipality lies at an altitude of 153 metres (502 ft) and covers an area of 7.29 km^{2} (2.81 sq mi) (2025).

== History ==
In historical records, the village was first mentioned in 1258 (Inám). In 1506 it belonged to Verbőczy family, and after to ecclesiastical Esztergom’s Capitol. From 1939 to 1944 it belonged to Hungary.

== Genealogical resources ==
The records for genealogical research are available at the state archive "Statny Archiv in Banska Bystrica, Nitra, Slovakia"

- Roman Catholic church records (births/marriages/deaths): 1771-1895 (parish B)

== Population ==
Population statistic (10 years)
Year	1995	2005	2015	2025
Count	556	501	481	431
Difference		−9.89%	−3.99%	−10.39%

Population statistic
Year	2024	2025
Count	446	431
Difference		−3.36%

It has a population of 431 people (31 December 2025).

=== Ethnicity ===
Census 2021 (1+ %)
Ethnicity	Number	Fraction
Hungarian	421	89.57%
Slovak	64	13.61%
Not found out	11	2.34%
Total	470	

In year 2021 was 470 people by ethnicity 421 as Hungarian, 64 as Slovak, 11 as Not found out, 2 as Other, 1 as Czech and 1 as Russian.

Note on population: The difference values of population numbers in the table "Population statistic" and in the sections "Ethnicity" & "Religion" is caused by the use of various statistical methods.

=== Religion ===
Census 2021 (1+ %)
Religion	Number	Fraction
Roman Catholic Church	434	92.34%
None	25	5.32%
Evangelical Church	5	1.06%
Total	470	

In year 2021 was 470 people by religion 434 from Roman Catholic Church, 25 from None, 5 from Evangelical Church, 2 from Not found out, 1 from Christian Congregations in Slovakia, 1 from Greek Catholic Church, 1 from Buddhism and 1 from Ad hoc movements.

== See also ==
- List of municipalities and towns in Slovakia
