= Veľký Krtíš District =

Coordinates: 48°12′27″N 19°20′52″E

- District
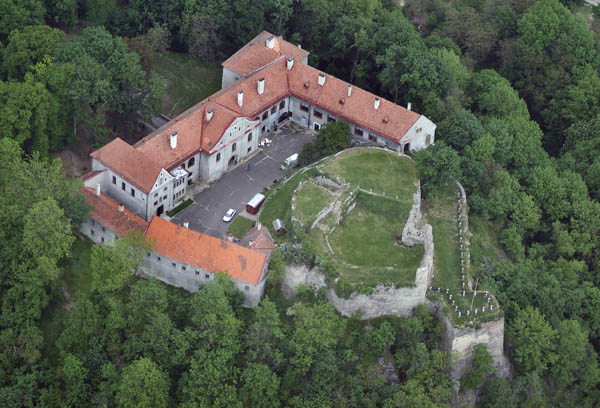
- Country: Slovakia
- Region (kraj): Banská Bystrica Region
- Seat: Veľký Krtíš

Area
  - Total: 848.14 km^{2} (327.47 sq mi)

Population (2025)
  - Total: 40,235
- Time zone: UTC+1 (CET)
  - Summer (DST): UTC+2 (CEST)
- Telephone prefix: 47
- Vehicle registration plate (until 2022): VK
- Municipalities: 71

Veľký Krtíš District (Slovak: okres Veľký Krtíš) is a district in the Banská Bystrica Region of central Slovakia. Until 1918, the district was split between the county of Kingdom of Hungary of Hont and Nógrád.

== Population ==
Population statistic (10 years)
Year	1995	2005	2015	2025
Count	46,876	46,355	44,489	40,235
Difference		−1.11%	−4.02%	−9.56%

Population statistic
Year	2024	2025
Count	40,598	40,235
Difference		−0.89%

It has a population of 40,235 people (31 December 2025).

Historical population
Year	Pop.	±%
1970	44,713	—
1980	45,887	+2.6%
1991	46,813	+2.0%
2001	46,741	−0.2%
2011	45,562	−2.5%
2021	41,998	−7.8%
Source: Statistical Office of the Slovak Republic

=== Ethnicity ===
Census 2021 (1+ %)
Ethnicity	Number	Fraction
Slovak	31,236	70.09%
Hungarian	9940	22.3%
Not found out	2187	4.9%
Romani	589	1.32%
Total	44,564	

In year 2021 was 44,564 people by ethnicity 31,236 as Slovak, 9940 as Hungarian, 2187 as Not found out, 589 as Romani, 235 as Czech, 73 as Other, 66 as Ukrainian, 47 as Russian, 37 as German, 24 as Polish, 23 as Italian, 17 as Rusyn, 14 as Romanian, 12 as Chinese, 12 as French, 8 as Serbian, 8 as English, 7 as Austrian, 7 as Canadian, 4 as Irish, 4 as Vietnamese, 4 as Bulgarian, 2 as Jewish, 2 as Moravian, 2 as Croatian, 2 as Albanian, 1 as Silesian and 1 as Greek.

Note on population: The difference values of population numbers in the table "Population statistic" and in the sections "Ethnicity" & "Religion" is caused by the use of various statistical methods.

=== Religion ===
Census 2021 (1+ %)
Religion	Number	Fraction
Roman Catholic Church	26,397	62.85%
None	6649	15.83%
Evangelical Church	5489	13.07%
Not found out	2331	5.55%
Total	41,998	

In year 2021 was 41,998 people by religion 26,397 from Roman Catholic Church, 6649 from None, 5489 from Evangelical Church, 2331 from Not found out, 346 from Greek Catholic Church, 204 from Christian Congregations in Slovakia, 81 from Ad hoc movements, 78 from Other, 72 from Eastern Orthodox Church, 65 from Calvinist Church, 59 from Jehovah's Witnesses, 42 from Other and not ascertained christian church, 31 from Baptists Church, 29 from Paganism and natural spirituality, 28 from Old Catholic Church, 26 from Seventh-day Adventist Church, 26 from Buddhism, 23 from United Methodist Church, 10 from Islam, 5 from Hinduism, 2 from Bahá'i Community, 1 from Jewish community, 1 from New Apostolic Church, 1 from Czechoslovak Hussite Church, 1 from Church of the Brethren and 1 from Apostolic Church.

== Municipalities ==
Municipality	Area [km^{2}]	Population
Balog nad Ipľom	8.35	773
Bátorová	5.94	321
Brusník	7.76	104
Bušince	12.53	1,344
Čebovce	16.20	1,005
Čeláre	12.53	520
Čelovce	36.87	415
Červeňany	6.74	41
Dačov Lom	24.54	394
Dolinka	7.29	431
Dolná Strehová	21.24	1,003
Dolné Plachtince	9.88	593
Dolné Strháre	17.70	194
Ďurkovce	4.93	109
Glabušovce	4.50	119
Horná Strehová	7.80	145
Horné Plachtince	10.53	216
Horné Strháre	12.76	257
Hrušov	23.30	804
Chrastince	4.04	196
Chrťany	9.18	118
Ipeľské Predmostie	13.83	539
Kamenné Kosihy	5.01	355
Kiarov	9.00	256
Kleňany	7.22	259
Koláre	5.14	236
Kosihovce	20.68	555
Kosihy nad Ipľom	6.84	371
Kováčovce	11.56	294
Lesenice	7.36	483
Ľuboriečka	11.63	148
Malá Čalomija	6.38	200
Malé Straciny	6.84	159
Malé Zlievce	9.07	280
Malý Krtíš	5.40	455
Modrý Kameň	19.62	1,634
Muľa	12.28	356
Nenince	13.45	1,253
Nová Ves	8.50	468
Obeckov	10.79	442
Olováry	18.61	247
Opatovská Nová Ves	9.15	624
Opava	11.76	110
Pôtor	19.28	748
Pravica	9.09	115
Príbelce	27.19	574
Sečianky	7.85	327
Seľany	7.61	144
Senné	15.88	191
Sklabiná	9.88	911
Slovenské Ďarmoty	10.49	508
Slovenské Kľačany	9.13	178
Stredné Plachtince	20.84	591
Sucháň	16.32	264
Suché Brezovo	11.47	72
Širákov	7.11	179
Šuľa	11.27	70
Trebušovce	9.49	160
Veľká Čalomija	8.85	563
Veľká Ves nad Ipľom	9.21	447
Veľké Straciny	6.27	173
Veľké Zlievce	16.30	463
Veľký Krtíš	15.00	10,049
Veľký Lom	10.63	128
Vieska	3.31	190
Vinica	30.77	1,758
Vrbovka	10.59	307
Záhorce	17.97	624
Závada	9.60	389
Zombor	3.29	143
Želovce	18.75	1,143

Population and area values are current for year 2025.
