= Veľká Ves nad Ipľom =

Veľká Ves nad Ipľom Ipolynagyfalu
- Municipality
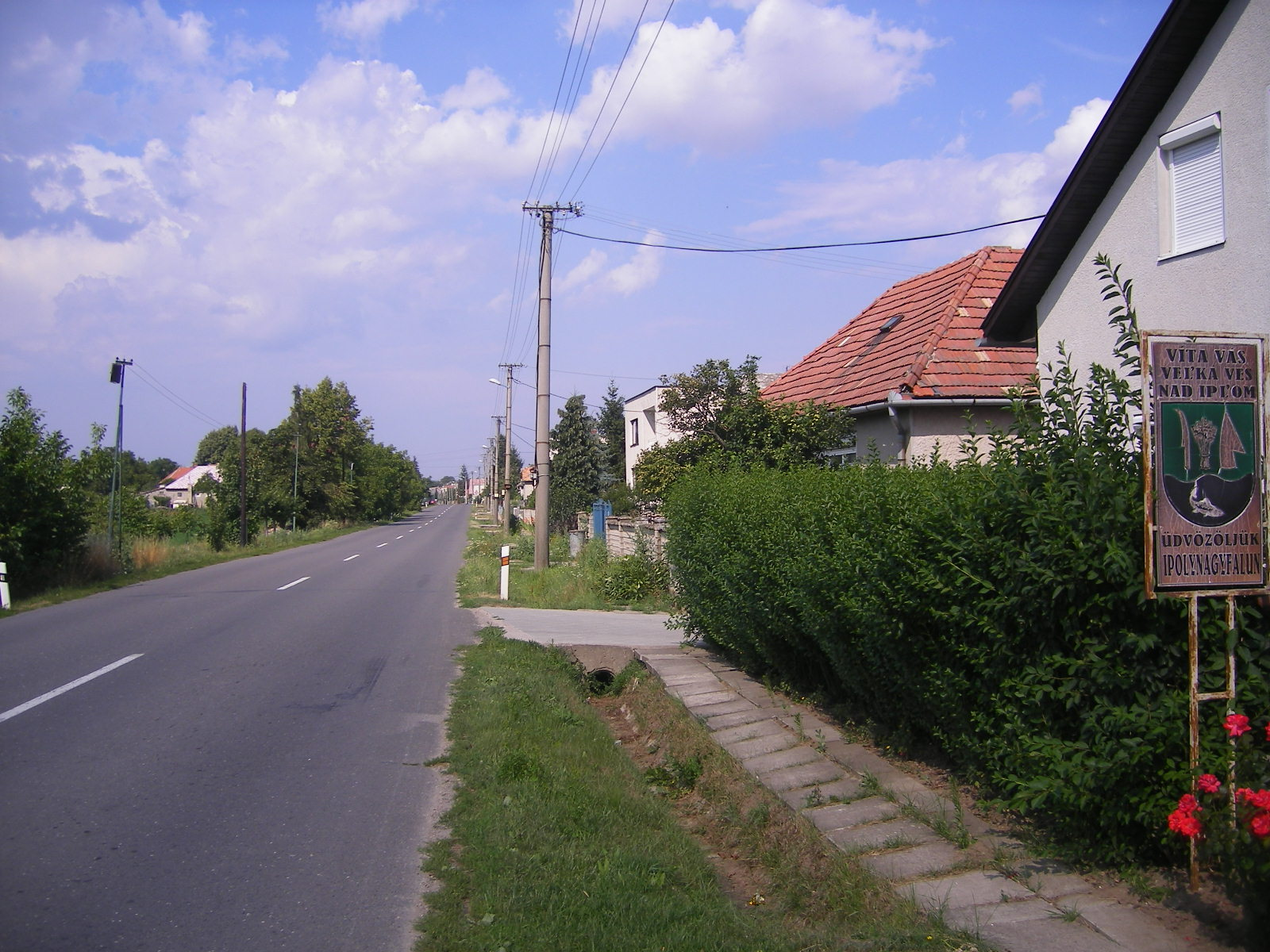

- Flag

- Location of Veľká Ves nad Ipľom in the Banská Bystrica Region Location of Veľká Ves nad Ipľom in Slovakia
- Coordinates: 48.08°N 19.10°E
- Country: Slovakia
- Region: Banská Bystrica Region
- District: Veľký Krtíš District
- First mentioned: 1252

Area
  - Total: 9.21 km^{2} (3.56 sq mi)
- Elevation: 134 m (440 ft)

Population (2025)
  - Total: 447
- Time zone: UTC+1 (CET)
  - Summer (DST): UTC+2 (CEST)
- Postal code: 991 10
- Area code: +421 47
- Vehicle registration plate (until 2022): VK
- Website: www.velkavesnadiplom.sk

Veľká Ves nad Ipľom (Hungarian: Ipolynagyfalu) is a village and municipality in the Veľký Krtíš District of the Banská Bystrica Region of southern Slovakia.

== Geography ==
The municipality lies at an altitude of 134 metres (440 ft) and covers an area of 9.21 km^{2} (3.56 sq mi) (2025).

== Population ==
Population statistic (10 years)
Year	1995	2005	2015	2025
Count	406	424	403	447
Difference		+4.43%	−4.95%	+10.91%

Population statistic
Year	2024	2025
Count	433	447
Difference		+3.23%

It has a population of 447 people (31 December 2025).

=== Ethnicity ===
Census 2021 (1+ %)
Ethnicity	Number	Fraction
Hungarian	264	65.18%
Slovak	152	37.53%
Not found out	23	5.67%
Romani	8	1.97%
Total	405	

In year 2021 was 405 people by ethnicity 264 as Hungarian, 152 as Slovak, 23 as Not found out, 8 as Romani, 4 as Czech and 1 as Austrian.

Note on population: The difference values of population numbers in the table "Population statistic" and in the sections "Ethnicity" & "Religion" is caused by the use of various statistical methods.

=== Religion ===
Census 2021 (1+ %)
Religion	Number	Fraction
Roman Catholic Church	326	80.49%
None	46	11.36%
Not found out	17	4.2%
Christian Congregations in Slovakia	7	1.73%
Total	405	

In year 2021 was 405 people by religion 326 from Roman Catholic Church, 46 from None, 17 from Not found out, 7 from Christian Congregations in Slovakia, 4 from Evangelical Church, 2 from Greek Catholic Church, 2 from Seventh-day Adventist Church and 1 from Calvinist Church.
