= Ľuboriečka =

Ľuboriečka Kislibercse
- Municipality
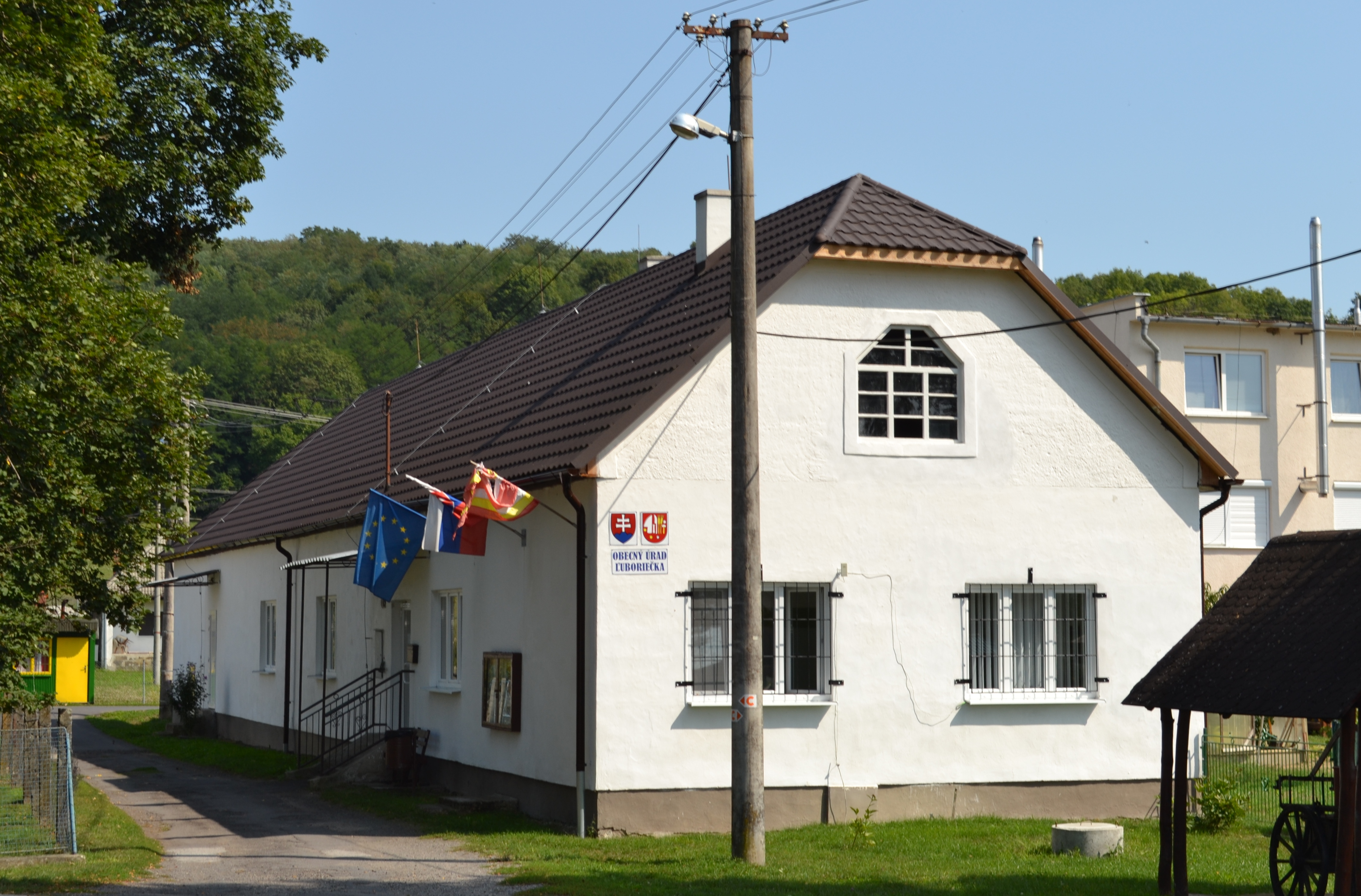

- Flag

- Location of Ľuboriečka in the Banská Bystrica Region Location of Ľuboriečka in Slovakia
- Coordinates: 48.26°N 19.53°E
- Country: Slovakia
- Region: Banská Bystrica Region
- District: Veľký Krtíš District
- First mentioned: 1335

Area
  - Total: 11.63 km^{2} (4.49 sq mi)
- Elevation: 230 m (750 ft)

Population (2025)
  - Total: 148
- Time zone: UTC+1 (CET)
  - Summer (DST): UTC+2 (CEST)
- Postal code: 991 02
- Area code: +421 47
- Vehicle registration plate (until 2022): VK
- Website: www.luboriecka.dcom.sk

Ľuboriečka (Hungarian: Kislibercse) is a village and municipality in the Veľký Krtíš District of the Banská Bystrica Region of southern Slovakia.

== Geography ==
The municipality lies at an altitude of 230 metres (750 ft) and covers an area of 11.63 km^{2} (4.49 sq mi) (2025).

== Population ==
Population statistic (10 years)
Year	1995	2005	2015	2025
Count	130	174	144	148
Difference		+33.84%	−17.24%	+2.77%

Population statistic
Year	2024	2025
Count	150	148
Difference		−1.33%

It has a population of 148 people (31 December 2025).

=== Ethnicity ===
Census 2021 (1+ %)
Ethnicity	Number	Fraction
Slovak	135	93.75%
Ukrainian	5	3.47%
Not found out	4	2.77%
Total	144	

In year 2021 was 144 people by ethnicity 135 as Slovak, 5 as Ukrainian, 4 as Not found out, 1 as Czech and 1 as Hungarian.

Note on population: The difference values of population numbers in the table "Population statistic" and in the sections "Ethnicity" & "Religion" is caused by the use of various statistical methods.

=== Religion ===
Census 2021 (1+ %)
Religion	Number	Fraction
Roman Catholic Church	102	70.83%
None	19	13.19%
Evangelical Church	14	9.72%
Not found out	4	2.78%
Greek Catholic Church	4	2.78%
Total	144	

In year 2021 was 144 people by religion 102 from Roman Catholic Church, 19 from None, 14 from Evangelical Church, 4 from Not found out, 4 from Greek Catholic Church and 1 from Ad hoc movements.
