= Čeláre =

Čeláre Csalár
- Municipality
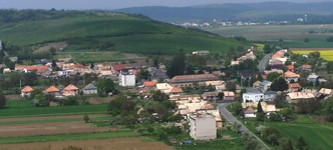

- Flag

- Location of Čeláre in the Banská Bystrica Region Location of Čeláre in Slovakia
- Coordinates: 48.14°N 19.49°E
- Country: Slovakia
- Region: Banská Bystrica Region
- District: Veľký Krtíš District
- First mentioned: 1436

Area
  - Total: 12.53 km^{2} (4.84 sq mi)
- Elevation: 154 m (505 ft)

Population (2025)
  - Total: 520
- Time zone: UTC+1 (CET)
  - Summer (DST): UTC+2 (CEST)
- Postal code: 991 22
- Area code: +421 47
- Vehicle registration plate (until 2022): VK
- Website: www.obeccelare.sk

Čeláre (Hungarian: Csalár) is a village and municipality in the Veľký Krtíš District of the Banská Bystrica Region of southern Slovakia.

== Geography ==
The municipality lies at an altitude of 154 metres (505 ft) and covers an area of 12.53 km^{2} (4.84 sq mi) (2025).

== History ==
The village was first mentioned in 1436 (Chalard). It belonged to many feudal families, and Feudal Law was always strictly applied here. From 1554 to 1593 it was occupied by Turks. Until 1918 and from 1938 to 1944 it belonged to Hungary.

== Genealogical resources ==
The records for genealogical research are available at the state archive "Statny Archiv in Banska Bystrica, Slovakia"

- Lutheran church records (births/marriages/deaths): 1745-1931 (parish B)

== Population ==
Population statistic (10 years)
Year	1995	2005	2015	2025
Count	528	514	459	520
Difference		−2.65%	−10.70%	+13.28%

Population statistic
Year	2024	2025
Count	512	520
Difference		+1.56%

It has a population of 520 people (31 December 2025).

=== Ethnicity ===
Census 2021 (1+ %)
Ethnicity	Number	Fraction
Slovak	349	72.7%
Hungarian	132	27.5%
Not found out	33	6.87%
Total	480	

In year 2021 was 480 people by ethnicity 349 as Slovak, 132 as Hungarian, 33 as Not found out, 3 as Romani, 2 as Czech, 1 as Russian and 1 as English.

Note on population: The difference values of population numbers in the table "Population statistic" and in the sections "Ethnicity" & "Religion" is caused by the use of various statistical methods.

=== Religion ===
Census 2021 (1+ %)
Religion	Number	Fraction
Roman Catholic Church	352	73.33%
None	62	12.92%
Not found out	28	5.83%
Evangelical Church	28	5.83%
Total	480	

In year 2021 was 480 people by religion 352 from Roman Catholic Church, 62 from None, 28 from Not found out, 28 from Evangelical Church, 3 from Old Catholic Church, 3 from Calvinist Church, 2 from Buddhism, 1 from Other and 1 from Baptists Church.

== See also ==
- List of municipalities and towns in Slovakia
