= Opava, Veľký Krtíš District =

Opava Apafalva
- Municipality
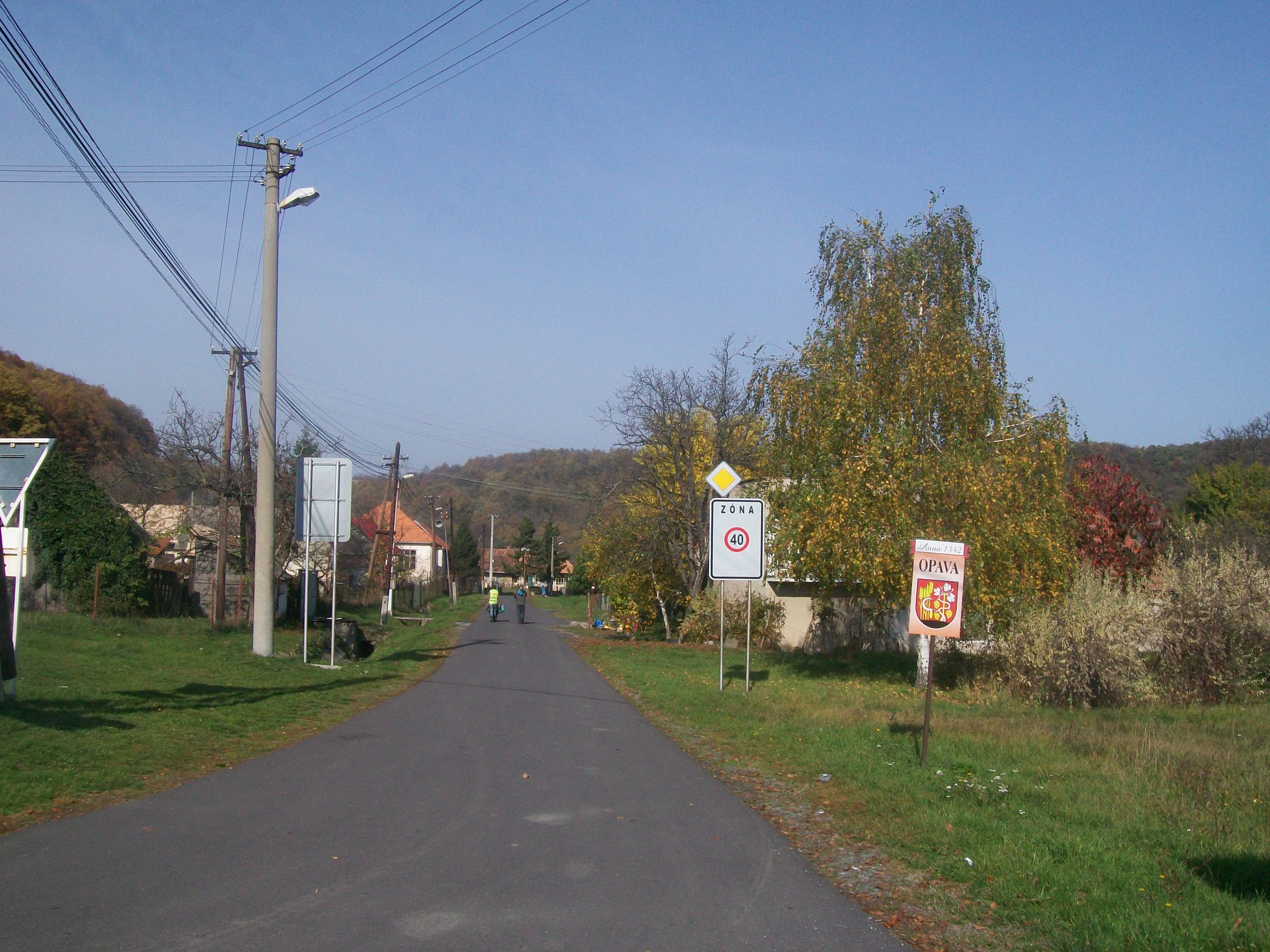

- Flag

- Location of Opava in the Banská Bystrica Region Location of Opava in Slovakia
- Coordinates: 48.20°N 19.18°E
- Country: Slovakia
- Region: Banská Bystrica Region
- District: Veľký Krtíš District
- First mentioned: 1342

Area
  - Total: 11.76 km^{2} (4.54 sq mi)
- Elevation: 400 m (1,300 ft)

Population (2025)
  - Total: 110
- Time zone: UTC+1 (CET)
  - Summer (DST): UTC+2 (CEST)
- Postal code: 991 41
- Area code: +421 47
- Vehicle registration plate (until 2022): VK
- Website: www.opava.sk

Opava (Hungarian: Apafalva) is a village and municipality in the Veľký Krtíš District of the Banská Bystrica Region of southern Slovakia.

== Population ==
Population statistic (10 years)
Year	1995	2005	2015	2025
Count	124	120	129	110
Difference		−3.22%	+7.5%	−14.72%

Population statistic
Year	2024	2025
Count	110	110
Difference		−1.42%

It has a population of 110 people (31 December 2025).

=== Ethnicity ===
Census 2021 (1+ %)
Ethnicity	Number	Fraction
Slovak	92	83.63%
Hungarian	9	8.18%
Not found out	3	2.72%
Ukrainian	2	1.81%
Albanian	2	1.81%
Total	110	

In year 2021 was 110 people by ethnicity 92 as Slovak, 9 as Hungarian, 3 as Not found out, 2 as Ukrainian, 2 as Albanian, 1 as Serbian, 1 as Romani, 1 as Rusyn and 1 as Other.

Note on population: The difference values of population numbers in the table "Population statistic" and in the sections "Ethnicity" & "Religion" is caused by the use of various statistical methods.

=== Religion ===
Census 2021 (1+ %)
Religion	Number	Fraction
None	38	34.55%
Roman Catholic Church	36	32.73%
Evangelical Church	26	23.64%
Not found out	3	2.73%
Eastern Orthodox Church	2	1.82%
Jehovah's Witnesses	2	1.82%
Greek Catholic Church	2	1.82%
Total	110	

In year 2021 was 110 people by religion 38 from None, 36 from Roman Catholic Church, 26 from Evangelical Church, 3 from Not found out, 2 from Eastern Orthodox Church, 2 from Jehovah's Witnesses, 2 from Greek Catholic Church and 1 from Calvinist Church.
