= Malé Zlievce =

Malé Zlievce Alsózellő
- Municipality
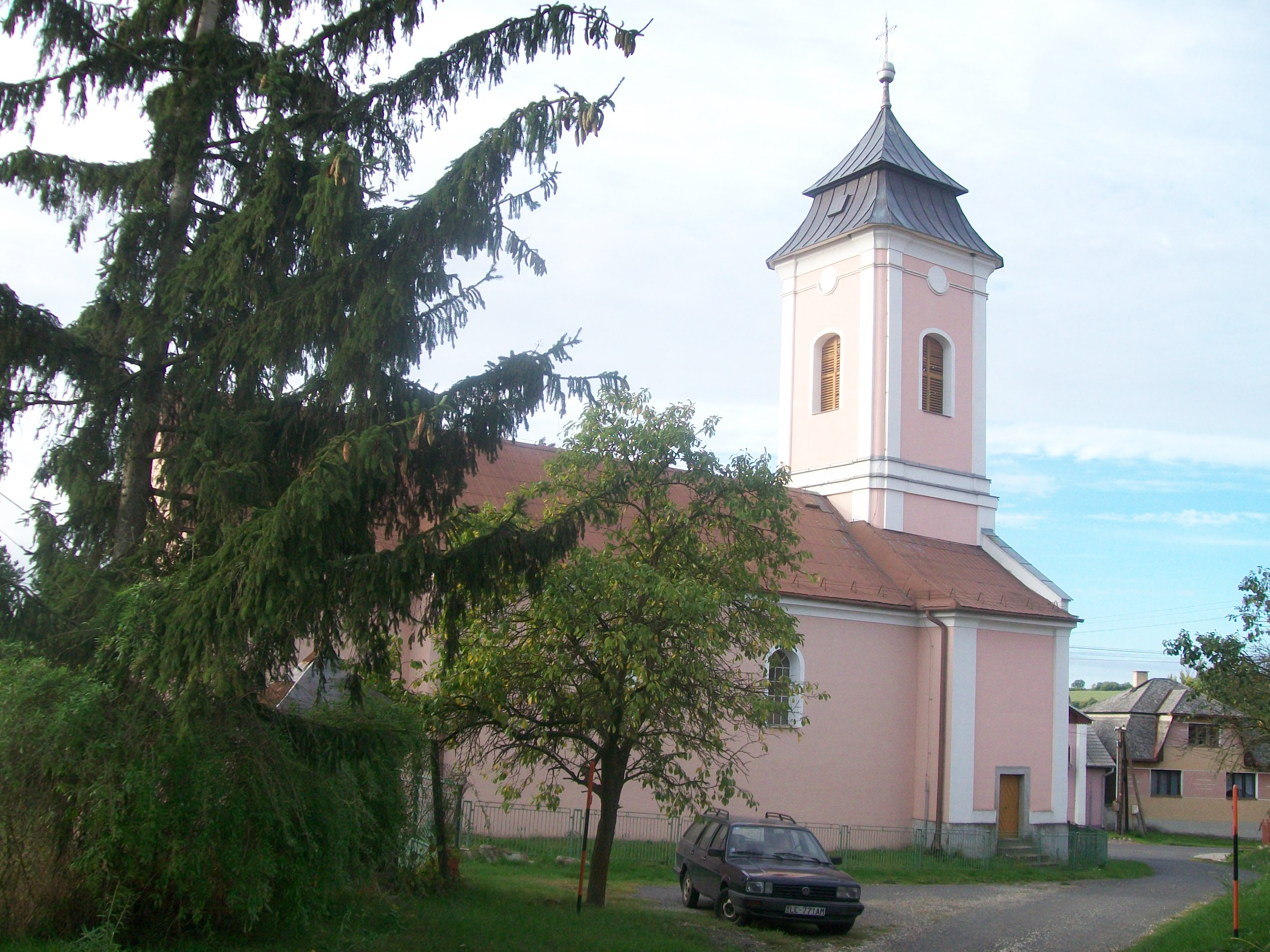
- Lutheran church in Malé Zlievce

- Flag

- Location of Malé Zlievce in the Banská Bystrica Region Location of Malé Zlievce in Slovakia
- Coordinates: 48.18°N 19.45°E
- Country: Slovakia
- Region: Banská Bystrica Region
- District: Veľký Krtíš District
- First mentioned: 1307

Area
  - Total: 9.07 km^{2} (3.50 sq mi)
- Elevation: 187 m (614 ft)

Population (2025)
  - Total: 280
- Time zone: UTC+1 (CET)
  - Summer (DST): UTC+2 (CEST)
- Postal code: 991 22
- Area code: +421 47
- Vehicle registration plate (until 2022): VK
- Website: malezlievce.webnode.sk

Malé Zlievce (Hungarian: Alsózellő) is a village and municipality in the Veľký Krtíš District of the Banská Bystrica Region of southern Slovakia.The village has got 280 inhabitants in January 2007.

== Geography ==
The municipality lies at an altitude of 187 metres (614 ft) and covers an area of 9.07 km^{2} (3.50 sq mi) (2025).

== Population ==
Population statistic (10 years)
| Year | 1995 | 2005 | 2015 | 2025 |
|---|---|---|---|---|
| Count | 241 | 261 | 287 | 280 |
| Difference | | +8.29% | +9.96% | −2.43% |

Population statistic
| Year | 2024 | 2025 |
|---|---|---|
| Count | 285 | 280 |
| Difference | | −1.75% |

It has a population of 280 people (31 December 2025).

=== Ethnicity ===
Census 2021 (1+ %)
| Ethnicity | Number | Fraction |
|---|---|---|
| Slovak | 285 | 96.93% |
| Czech | 7 | 2.38% |
| Not found out | 6 | 2.04% |
| Hungarian | 5 | 1.7% |
| Total | 294 | |

In year 2021 was 294 people by ethnicity 285 as Slovak, 7 as Czech, 6 as Not found out, 5 as Hungarian and 1 as Russian.

Note on population: The difference values of population numbers in the table "Population statistic" and in the sections "Ethnicity" & "Religion" is caused by the use of various statistical methods.

=== Religion ===
Census 2021 (1+ %)
| Religion | Number | Fraction |
|---|---|---|
| Roman Catholic Church | 162 | 55.1% |
| Evangelical Church | 76 | 25.85% |
| None | 46 | 15.65% |
| Not found out | 4 | 1.36% |
| Total | 294 | |

In year 2021 was 294 people by religion 162 from Roman Catholic Church, 76 from Evangelical Church, 46 from None, 4 from Not found out, 2 from Greek Catholic Church, 2 from Ad hoc movements, 1 from Christian Congregations in Slovakia and 1 from United Methodist Church.
