= Lesenice =

Lesenice Leszenye
- Municipality
- Flag

- Location of Lesenice in the Banská Bystrica Region Location of Lesenice in Slovakia
- Coordinates: 48.10°N 19.25°E
- Country: Slovakia
- Region: Banská Bystrica Region
- District: Veľký Krtíš District
- First mentioned: 1244

Area
  - Total: 7.36 km^{2} (2.84 sq mi)
- Elevation: 169 m (554 ft)

Population (2025)
  - Total: 483
- Time zone: UTC+1 (CET)
  - Summer (DST): UTC+2 (CEST)
- Postal code: 991 08
- Area code: +421 47
- Vehicle registration plate (until 2022): VK
- Website: www.lesenice.sk

Lesenice (Hungarian: Leszenye) is a village and municipality in the Veľký Krtíš District of the Banská Bystrica Region of southern Slovakia.

== Geography ==
The municipality lies at an altitude of 169 metres (554 ft) and covers an area of 7.36 km^{2} (2.84 sq mi) (2025).

== Population ==
Population statistic (10 years)
Year	1995	2005	2015	2025
Count	534	540	522	483
Difference		+1.12%	−3.33%	−7.47%

Population statistic
Year	2024	2025
Count	485	483
Difference		−0.41%

It has a population of 483 people (31 December 2025).

=== Ethnicity ===
Census 2021 (1+ %)
Ethnicity	Number	Fraction
Slovak	425	87.26%
Hungarian	90	18.48%
Not found out	18	3.69%
Total	487	

In year 2021 was 487 people by ethnicity 425 as Slovak, 90 as Hungarian, 18 as Not found out, 4 as Romani and 1 as Czech.

Note on population: The difference values of population numbers in the table "Population statistic" and in the sections "Ethnicity" & "Religion" is caused by the use of various statistical methods.

=== Religion ===
Census 2021 (1+ %)
Religion	Number	Fraction
Roman Catholic Church	387	79.47%
Evangelical Church	61	12.53%
Not found out	18	3.7%
None	14	2.87%
Greek Catholic Church	6	1.23%
Total	487	

In year 2021 was 487 people by religion 387 from Roman Catholic Church, 61 from Evangelical Church, 18 from Not found out, 14 from None, 6 from Greek Catholic Church and 1 from Other and not ascertained christian church.
