= Stredné Plachtince =

Stredné Plachtince Középpalojta
- Municipality
- Flag

- Location of Stredné Plachtince in the Banská Bystrica Region Location of Stredné Plachtince in Slovakia
- Coordinates: 48.23°N 19.30°E
- Country: Slovakia
- Region: Banská Bystrica Region
- District: Veľký Krtíš District
- First mentioned: 1473

Area
  - Total: 20.84 km^{2} (8.05 sq mi)
- Elevation: 225 m (738 ft)

Population (2025)
  - Total: 591
- Time zone: UTC+1 (CET)
  - Summer (DST): UTC+2 (CEST)
- Postal code: 991 24
- Area code: +421 47
- Vehicle registration plate (until 2022): VK
- Website: www.stredneplachtince.sk

Stredné Plachtince (Hungarian: Középpalojta) is a village and municipality in the Veľký Krtíš District of the Banská Bystrica Region of southern Slovakia.

== Geography ==
The municipality lies at an altitude of 225 metres (738 ft) and covers an area of 20.84 km^{2} (8.05 sq mi) (2025).

== Population ==
Population statistic (10 years)
Year	1995	2005	2015	2025
Count	599	636	605	591
Difference		+6.17%	−4.87%	−2.31%

Population statistic
Year	2024	2025
Count	599	591
Difference		−1.33%

It has a population of 591 people (31 December 2025).

=== Ethnicity ===
Census 2021 (1+ %)
Ethnicity	Number	Fraction
Slovak	585	97.17%
Not found out	15	2.49%
Romani	10	1.66%
Total	602	

In year 2021 was 602 people by ethnicity 585 as Slovak, 15 as Not found out, 10 as Romani, 5 as Hungarian, 3 as Other, 2 as German, 1 as Czech and 1 as Serbian.

Note on population: The difference values of population numbers in the table "Population statistic" and in the sections "Ethnicity" & "Religion" is caused by the use of various statistical methods.

=== Religion ===
Census 2021 (1+ %)
Religion	Number	Fraction
Evangelical Church	329	54.65%
Roman Catholic Church	181	30.07%
None	67	11.13%
Not found out	12	1.99%
Total	602	

In year 2021 was 602 people by religion 329 from Evangelical Church, 181 from Roman Catholic Church, 67 from None, 12 from Not found out, 5 from Greek Catholic Church, 2 from Other and not ascertained christian church, 2 from Other, 1 from Eastern Orthodox Church, 1 from Paganism and natural spirituality, 1 from Jehovah's Witnesses and 1 from Baptists Church.
