= Seľany =

Seľany Szelény
- Municipality
- Flag

- Location of Seľany in the Banská Bystrica Region Location of Seľany in Slovakia
- Coordinates: 48.17°N 19.20°E
- Country: Slovakia
- Region: Banská Bystrica Region
- District: Veľký Krtíš District
- First mentioned: 1268

Area
  - Total: 7.61 km^{2} (2.94 sq mi)
- Elevation: 213 m (699 ft)

Population (2025)
  - Total: 144
- Time zone: UTC+1 (CET)
  - Summer (DST): UTC+2 (CEST)
- Postal code: 991 27
- Area code: +421 47
- Vehicle registration plate (until 2022): VK
- Website: www.selany.sk

Seľany (Hungarian: Szelény) is a village and municipality in the Veľký Krtíš District of the Banská Bystrica Region of southern Slovakia.

== Geography ==
The municipality lies at an altitude of 213 metres (699 ft) and covers an area of 7.61 km^{2} (2.94 sq mi) (2025).

== Population ==
Population statistic (10 years)
Year	1995	2005	2015	2025
Count	252	228	194	144
Difference		−9.52%	−14.91%	−25.77%

Population statistic
Year	2024	2025
Count	140	144
Difference		+2.85%

It has a population of 144 people (31 December 2025).

=== Ethnicity ===
Census 2021 (1+ %)
Ethnicity	Number	Fraction
Slovak	102	62.96%
Hungarian	61	37.65%
Not found out	11	6.79%
Total	162	

In year 2021 was 162 people by ethnicity 102 as Slovak, 61 as Hungarian, 11 as Not found out and 1 as Czech.

Note on population: The difference values of population numbers in the table "Population statistic" and in the sections "Ethnicity" & "Religion" is caused by the use of various statistical methods.

=== Religion ===
Census 2021 (1+ %)
Religion	Number	Fraction
Roman Catholic Church	134	82.72%
None	11	6.79%
Not found out	8	4.94%
Evangelical Church	6	3.7%
Other	2	1.23%
Total	162	

In year 2021 was 162 people by religion 134 from Roman Catholic Church, 11 from None, 8 from Not found out, 6 from Evangelical Church, 2 from Other and 1 from Greek Catholic Church.
