= Suché Brezovo =

- Municipality
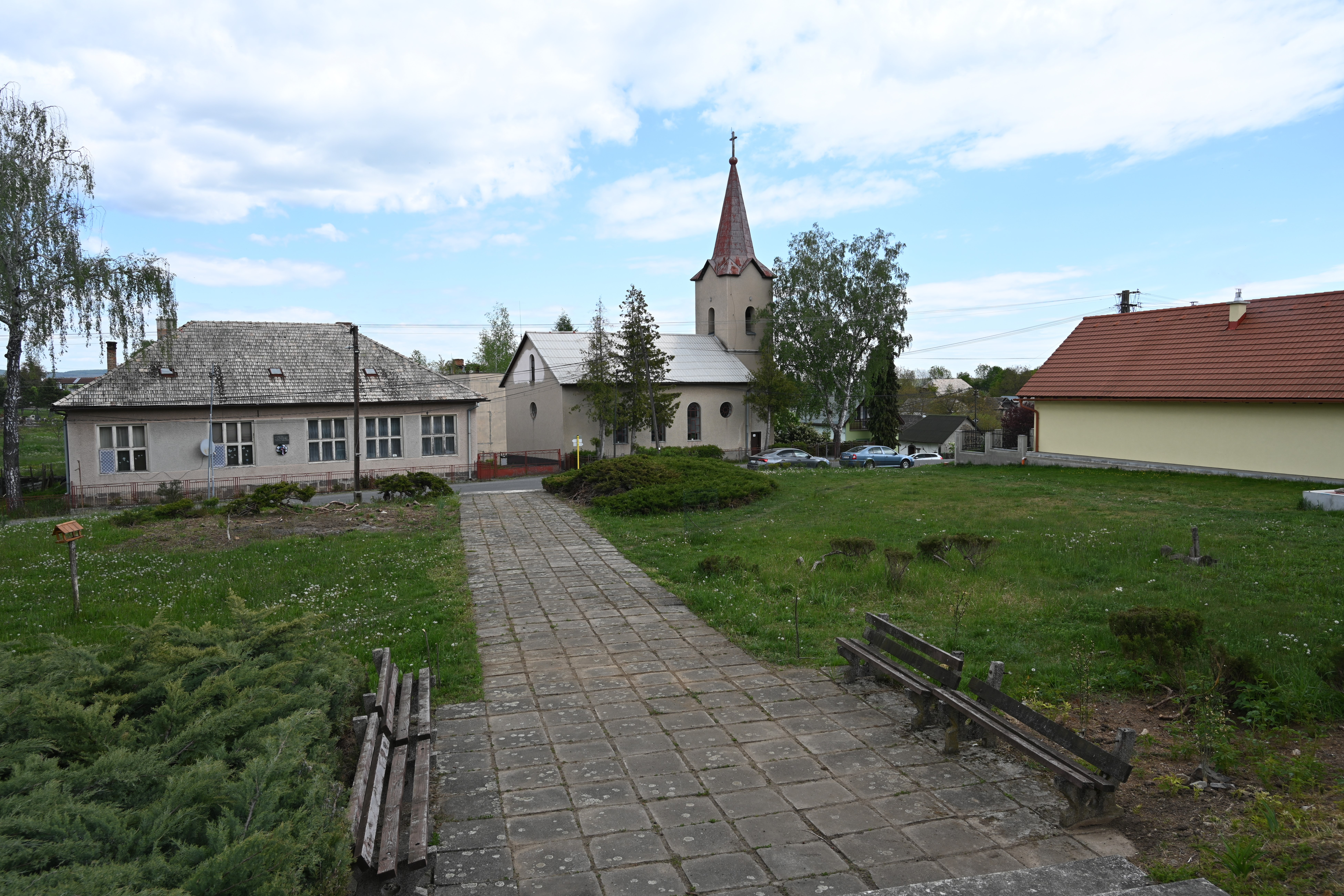

- Flag

- Location of Suché Brezovo in the Banská Bystrica Region Location of Suché Brezovo in Slovakia
- Coordinates: 48.32°N 19.37°E
- Country: Slovakia
- Region: Banská Bystrica Region
- District: Veľký Krtíš District
- First mentioned: 1573

Area
  - Total: 11.47 km^{2} (4.43 sq mi)
- Elevation: 404 m (1,325 ft)

Population (2025)
  - Total: 72
- Time zone: UTC+1 (CET)
  - Summer (DST): UTC+2 (CEST)
- Postal code: 991 01
- Area code: +421 47
- Vehicle registration plate (until 2022): VK
- Website: www.suchebrezovo.sk

Suché Brezovo (Hungarian: Száraznyírjes) is a village and municipality in the Veľký Krtíš District of the Banská Bystrica Region of southern Slovakia.

== Geography ==
The municipality lies at an altitude of 404 metres (1,325 ft) and covers an area of 11.47 km^{2} (4.43 sq mi) (2025).

== Population ==
Population statistic (10 years)
Year	1995	2005	2015	2025
Count	137	128	102	72
Difference		−6.56%	−20.31%	−29.41%

Population statistic
Year	2024	2025
Count	77	72
Difference		−6.49%

It has a population of 72 people (31 December 2025).

=== Ethnicity ===
Census 2021 (1+ %)
Ethnicity	Number	Fraction
Slovak	92	97.87%
Romani	1	1.06%
Not found out	1	1.06%
Hungarian	1	1.06%
Total	94	

In year 2021 was 94 people by ethnicity 92 as Slovak, 1 as Romani, 1 as Not found out and 1 as Hungarian.

Note on population: The difference values of population numbers in the table "Population statistic" and in the sections "Ethnicity" & "Religion" is caused by the use of various statistical methods.

=== Religion ===
Census 2021 (1+ %)
Religion	Number	Fraction
Evangelical Church	45	47.87%
Roman Catholic Church	25	26.6%
None	18	19.15%
Seventh-day Adventist Church	4	4.26%
New Apostolic Church	1	1.06%
Not found out	1	1.06%
Total	94	

In year 2021 was 94 people by religion 45 from Evangelical Church, 25 from Roman Catholic Church, 18 from None, 4 from Seventh-day Adventist Church, 1 from New Apostolic Church and 1 from Not found out.
