= Dolné Strháre =

Dolné Strháre Alsóesztergály
- Municipality
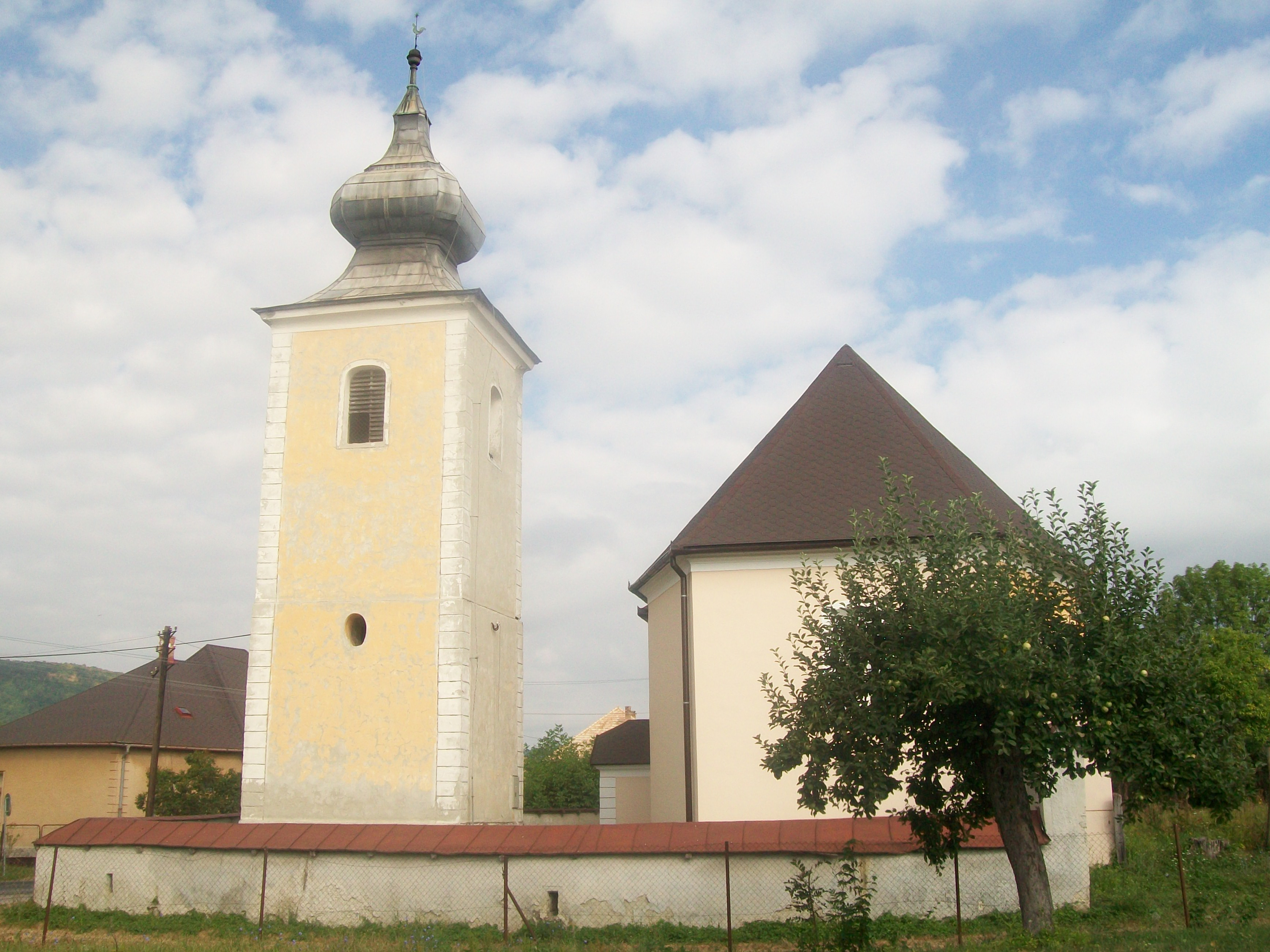

- Flag

- Location of Dolné Strháre in the Banská Bystrica Region Location of Dolné Strháre in Slovakia
- Coordinates: 48.25°N 19.40°E
- Country: Slovakia
- Region: Banská Bystrica Region
- District: Veľký Krtíš District
- First mentioned: 1244

Area
  - Total: 17.70 km^{2} (6.83 sq mi)
- Elevation: 240 m (790 ft)

Population (2025)
  - Total: 194
- Time zone: UTC+1 (CET)
  - Summer (DST): UTC+2 (CEST)
- Postal code: 991 04
- Area code: +421 47
- Vehicle registration plate (until 2022): VK
- Website: www.dolnestrhare.sk

Dolné Strháre (Hungarian: Alsóesztergály) is a village and municipality in the Veľký Krtíš District of the Banská Bystrica Region of southern Slovakia.

== Geography ==
The municipality lies at an altitude of 240 metres (790 ft) and covers an area of 17.70 km^{2} (6.83 sq mi) (2025).

== History ==
In historical records, the village was first mentioned in 1244 (1244 Stergar, 1247 Strugar, 1243 Estergur, Vzturgar, 1260 Strogar), as a royal dominion. In 1260 it was given to the chief Mattheus from Bratislava and after to Divín castle. From 1554 to 1594 it was under Turkish domination. In the 17th century it belonged to Modrý Kameň.

== Population ==
Population statistic (10 years)
| Year | 1995 | 2005 | 2015 | 2025 |
|---|---|---|---|---|
| Count | 162 | 175 | 192 | 194 |
| Difference | | +8.02% | +9.71% | +1.04% |

Population statistic
| Year | 2024 | 2025 |
|---|---|---|
| Count | 201 | 194 |
| Difference | | −3.48% |

It has a population of 194 people (31 December 2025).

=== Ethnicity ===
Census 2021 (1+ %)
| Ethnicity | Number | Fraction |
|---|---|---|
| Slovak | 187 | 94.44% |
| Romani | 17 | 8.58% |
| Not found out | 7 | 3.53% |
| Russian | 4 | 2.02% |
| Hungarian | 4 | 2.02% |
| Total | 198 | |

In year 2021 was 198 people by ethnicity 187 as Slovak, 17 as Romani, 7 as Not found out, 4 as Russian, 4 as Hungarian, 1 as Czech, 1 as Rusyn, 1 as German and 1 as Croatian.

Note on population: The difference values of population numbers in the table "Population statistic" and in the sections "Ethnicity" & "Religion" is caused by the use of various statistical methods.

=== Religion ===
Census 2021 (1+ %)
| Religion | Number | Fraction |
|---|---|---|
| Roman Catholic Church | 86 | 43.43% |
| Evangelical Church | 58 | 29.29% |
| None | 40 | 20.2% |
| Not found out | 11 | 5.56% |
| Eastern Orthodox Church | 2 | 1.01% |
| Total | 198 | |

In year 2021 was 198 people by religion 86 from Roman Catholic Church, 58 from Evangelical Church, 40 from None, 11 from Not found out, 2 from Eastern Orthodox Church and 1 from Greek Catholic Church.

== Genealogical resources ==
The records for genealogical research are available at the state archive "Statny Archiv in Banska Bystrica, Slovakia"

- Roman Catholic church records (births/marriages/deaths): 1754-1896 (parish B)
- Lutheran church records (births/marriages/deaths): 1786-1836 (parish A)
- Reformated church records (births/marriages/deaths): 1800-1896 (parish B)

== See also ==
- List of municipalities and towns in Slovakia
