= Malé Straciny =

Malé Straciny Kishalom
- Municipality
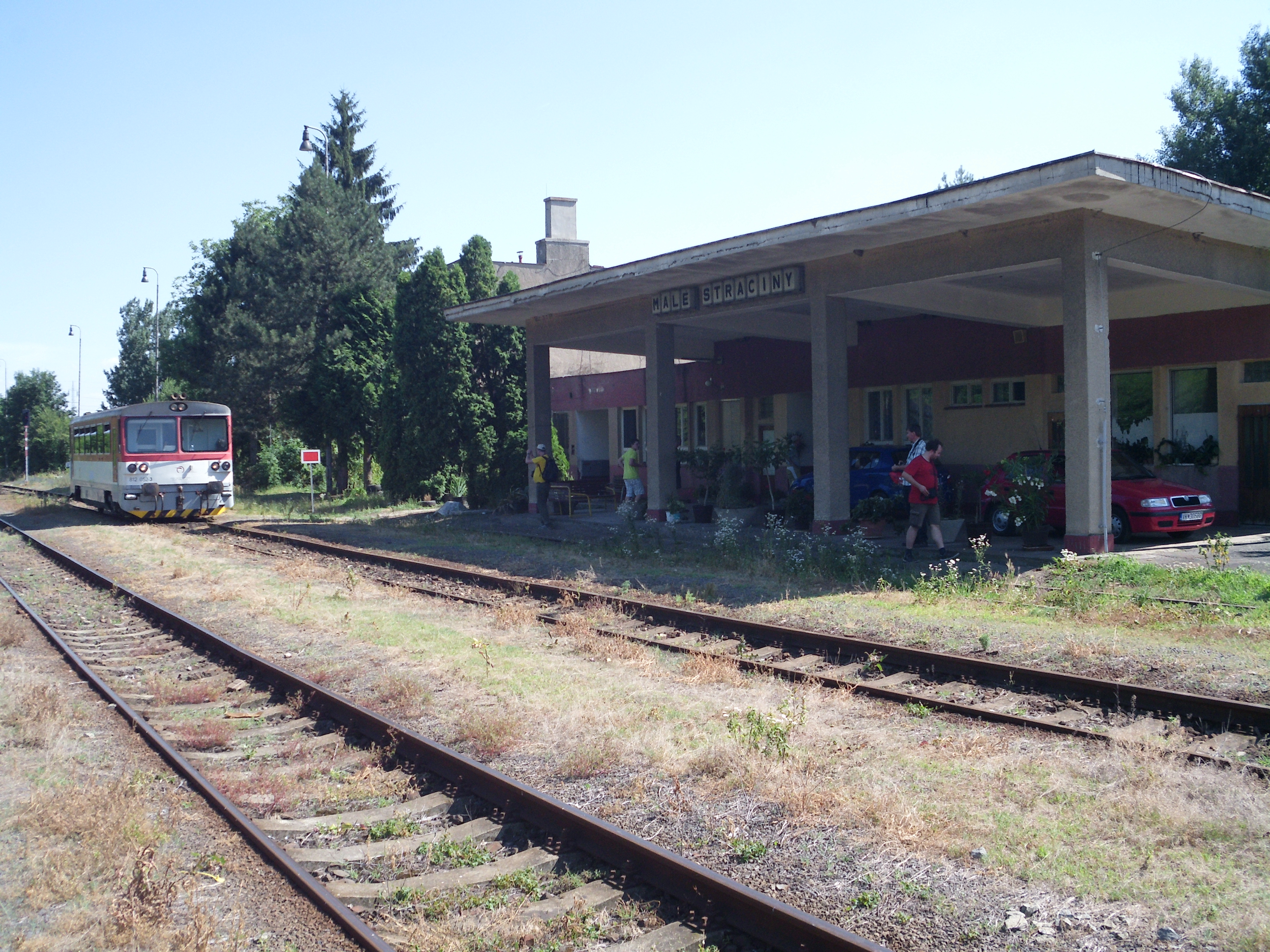

- Flag

- Location of Malé Straciny in the Banská Bystrica Region Location of Malé Straciny in Slovakia
- Coordinates: 48.22°N 19.42°E
- Country: Slovakia
- Region: Banská Bystrica Region
- District: Veľký Krtíš District
- First mentioned: 1573

Area
  - Total: 6.84 km^{2} (2.64 sq mi)
- Elevation: 208 m (682 ft)

Population (2025)
  - Total: 159
- Time zone: UTC+1 (CET)
  - Summer (DST): UTC+2 (CEST)
- Postal code: 991 03
- Area code: +421 47
- Vehicle registration plate (until 2022): VK
- Website: malestraciny.sk

Malé Straciny (Hungarian: Kishalom) is a village and municipality in the Veľký Krtíš District of the Banská Bystrica Region of southern Slovakia.

== Geography ==
The municipality lies at an altitude of 208 metres (682 ft) and covers an area of 6.84 km^{2} (2.64 sq mi) (2025).

== Population ==
Population statistic (10 years)
Year	1995	2005	2015	2025
Count	146	120	136	159
Difference		−17.80%	+13.33%	+16.91%

Population statistic
Year	2024	2025
Count	149	159
Difference		+6.71%

It has a population of 159 people (31 December 2025).

=== Ethnicity ===
Census 2021 (1+ %)
Ethnicity	Number	Fraction
Slovak	142	94.03%
Not found out	8	5.29%
Total	151	

In year 2021 was 151 people by ethnicity 142 as Slovak, 8 as Not found out, 1 as Ukrainian, 1 as Russian and 1 as Other.

Note on population: The difference values of population numbers in the table "Population statistic" and in the sections "Ethnicity" & "Religion" is caused by the use of various statistical methods.

=== Religion ===
Census 2021 (1+ %)
Religion	Number	Fraction
Roman Catholic Church	82	54.3%
Evangelical Church	33	21.85%
None	29	19.21%
Not found out	4	2.65%
Total	151	

In year 2021 was 151 people by religion 82 from Roman Catholic Church, 33 from Evangelical Church, 29 from None, 4 from Not found out, 1 from Other, 1 from Greek Catholic Church and 1 from Bahá'i Community.
