= Vieska, Veľký Krtíš District =

Vieska Tótkisfalu
- Municipality
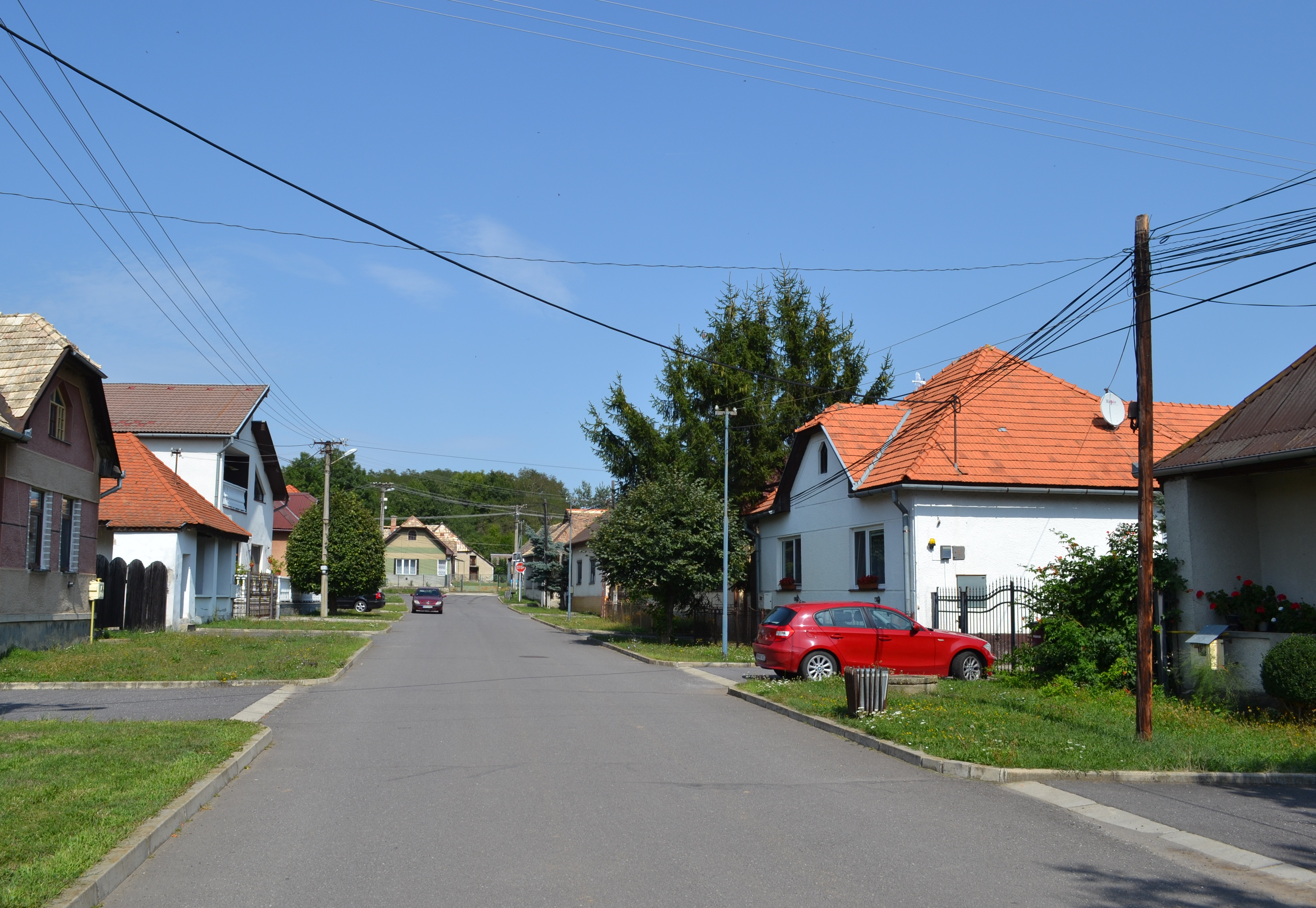

- Flag

- Location of Vieska in the Banská Bystrica Region Location of Vieska in Slovakia
- Coordinates: 48.26°N 19.47°E
- Country: Slovakia
- Region: Banská Bystrica Region
- District: Veľký Krtíš District
- First mentioned: 1447

Area
  - Total: 3.31 km^{2} (1.28 sq mi)
- Elevation: 188 m (617 ft)

Population (2025)
  - Total: 190
- Time zone: UTC+1 (CET)
  - Summer (DST): UTC+2 (CEST)
- Postal code: 991 02
- Area code: +421 47
- Vehicle registration plate (until 2022): VK
- Website: vieska-vk.webnode.sk

Vieska (Hungarian: Tótkisfalu) is a village and municipality in the Veľký Krtíš District of the Banská Bystrica Region of southern Slovakia.

== Population ==
Population statistic (10 years)
Year	1995	2005	2015	2025
Count	204	207	223	190
Difference		+1.47%	+7.72%	−14.79%

Population statistic
Year	2024	2025
Count	188	190
Difference		+1.06%

It has a population of 190 people (31 December 2025).

=== Ethnicity ===
Census 2021 (1+ %)
Ethnicity	Number	Fraction
Slovak	189	95.93%
Not found out	6	3.04%
Other	3	1.52%
Czech	2	1.01%
Russian	2	1.01%
Total	197	

In year 2021 was 197 people by ethnicity 189 as Slovak, 6 as Not found out, 3 as Other, 2 as Czech, 2 as Russian and 1 as Romani.

Note on population: The difference values of population numbers in the table "Population statistic" and in the sections "Ethnicity" & "Religion" is caused by the use of various statistical methods.

=== Religion ===
Census 2021 (1+ %)
Religion	Number	Fraction
Roman Catholic Church	103	52.28%
Evangelical Church	39	19.8%
None	38	19.29%
Not found out	10	5.08%
Greek Catholic Church	3	1.52%
Total	197	

In year 2021 was 197 people by religion 103 from Roman Catholic Church, 39 from Evangelical Church, 38 from None, 10 from Not found out, 3 from Greek Catholic Church, 1 from Eastern Orthodox Church, 1 from United Methodist Church, 1 from Seventh-day Adventist Church and 1 from Ad hoc movements.
