= Považská Bystrica =

Place in Trenčín region, Slovakia

- Municipality
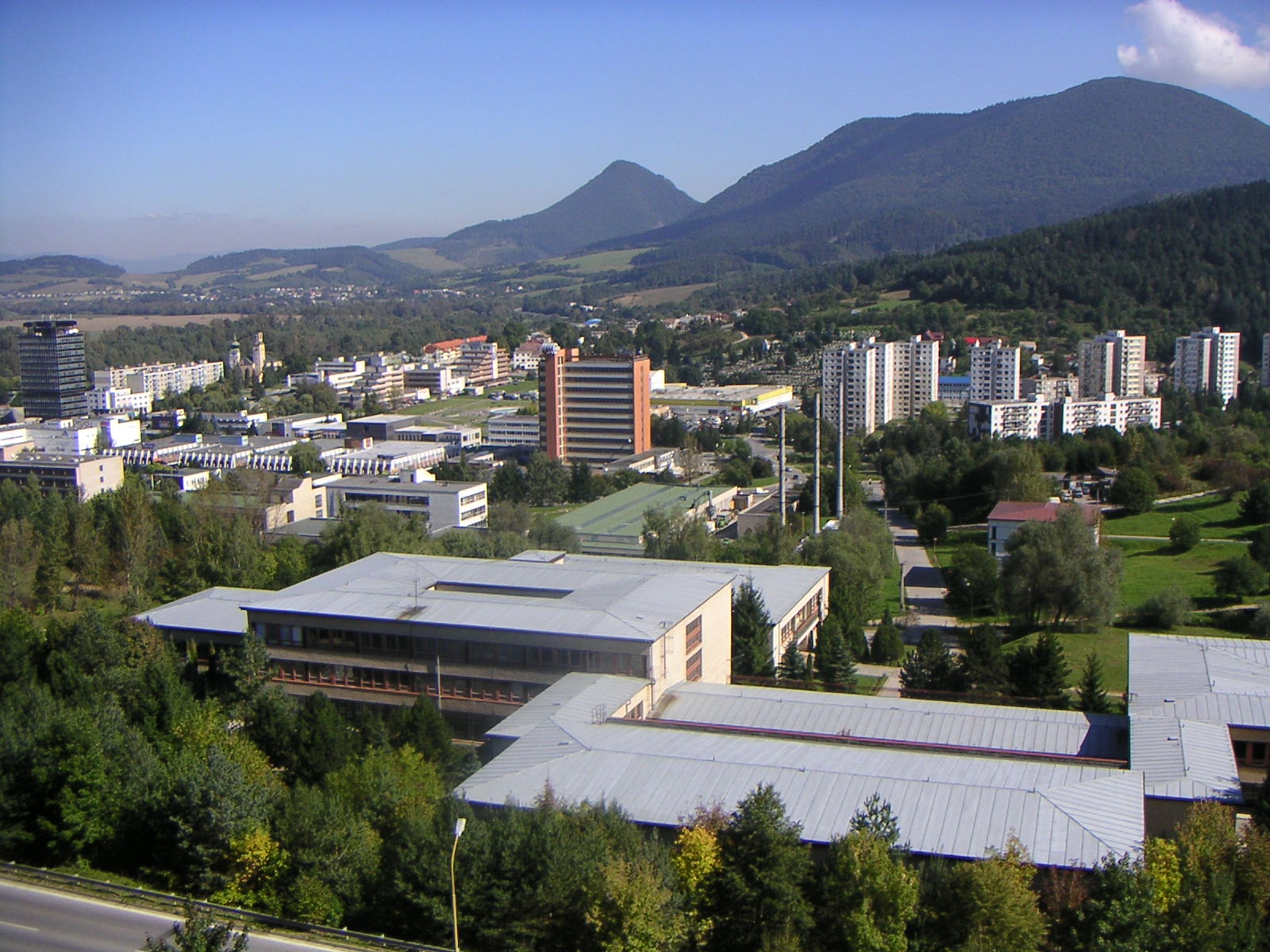
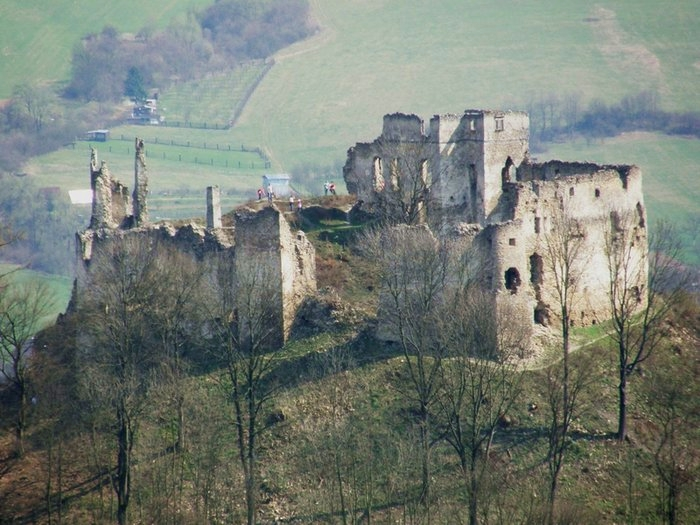
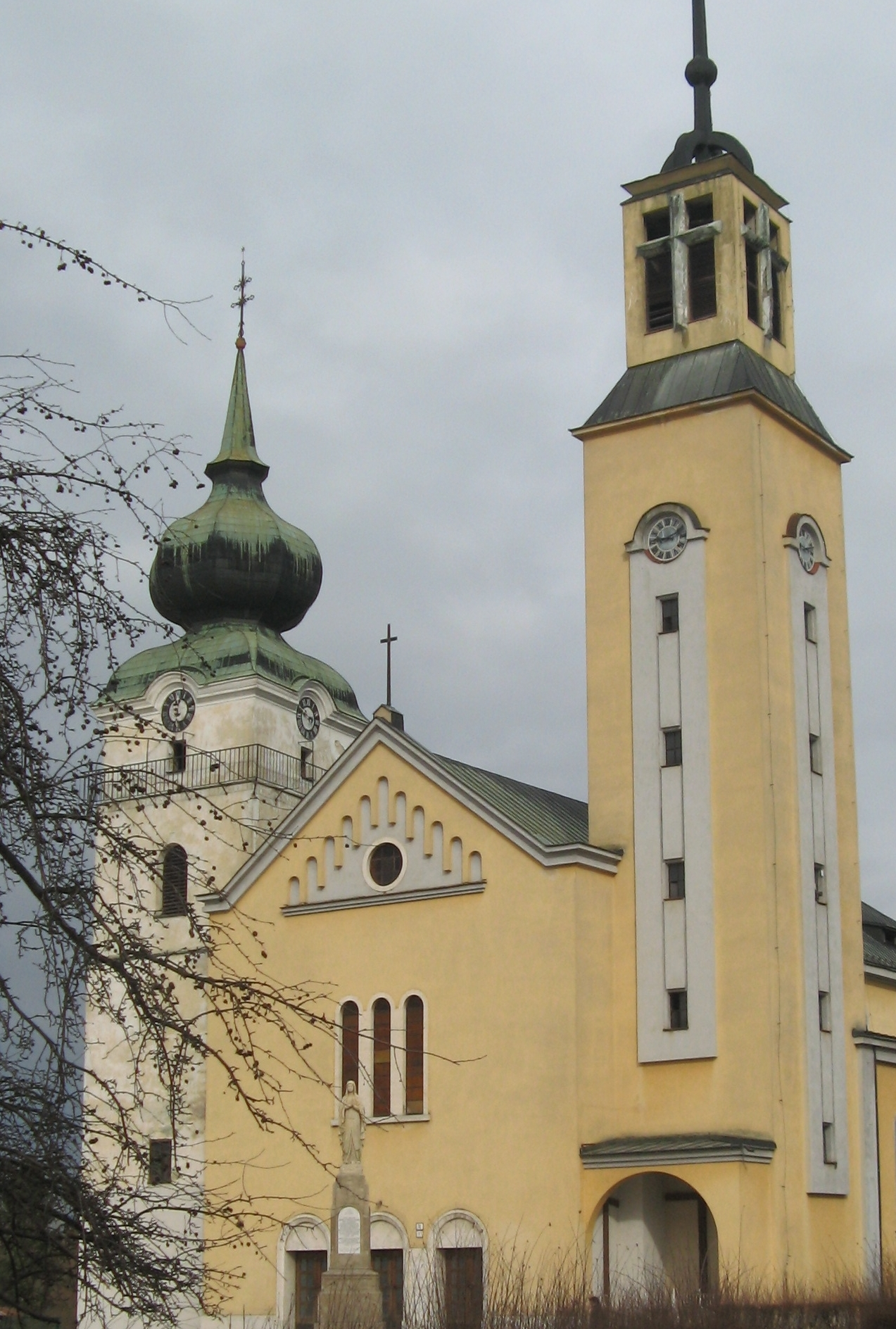
- From the top, View of the town centre from the Rozkvet residential estate, Považský hrad, Church of Visitation of Virgin Mary

- Flag Coat of arms

- Location of Považská Bystrica in the Trenčín Region Location of Považská Bystrica in Slovakia
- Coordinates: 49.11°N 18.44°E
- Country: Slovakia
- Region: Trenčín Region
- District: Považská Bystrica District
- First mentioned: 1330
- Town rights: 1946

Government
  - Mayor: Karol Janas (HLAS)

Area
  - Total: 90.55 km^{2} (34.96 sq mi)
- Elevation: 321 m (1,053 ft)

Population (2025)
  - Total: 36,690
- Time zone: UTC+1 (CET)
  - Summer (DST): UTC+2 (CEST)
- Postal code: 0170 1
- Area code: +421 42
- Vehicle registration plate (until 2022): PB
- Website: www.povazska-bystrica.sk

Považská Bystrica (Slovak pronunciation: [ˈpɔʋaʂskaː ˈbistritsa]; German: Waagbistritz; Hungarian: Vágbeszterce) is a town in northwestern Slovakia. It is located on the Váh river, around 30 km from the city of Žilina. It belongs to Upper Váh Region.

== Geography ==
The municipality lies at an altitude of 321 metres (1,053 ft) and covers an area of 90.55 km^{2} (34.96 sq mi) (2025).

== Profile ==
Považská Bystrica is situated in a fold of mountain ranges Strážovské vrchy (1213 m) and Javorníky (1071 m a.s.l.). Mountains offer an attractive experience to trekkers and mountain-bikers in summer season, cross-country and skiing opportunities in winter season. Veľký Manín mountain (890 m a.s.l.) dominates the town skyline providing views from most places in the town. On the hill next to the town on the opposite side of the river Váh lies the ruins of Považský hrad castle with two manor houses beneath, to which the town's history is closely bounded.

Another popular tourist attraction close to the town is a breathtaking canyon Manínska tiesňava. Canyon splits Veľký and Malý Manín mountains. It is an internationally sought-after place-to-die for rock climbers. It is also less known as one of the filming sites for The NeverEnding Story in 1984. Just a few kilometers away lies another highly challenging reef formation: Súľovské skaly. To sum it up one of the most famous Slovak spas Rajecké Teplice lies about 20 km from the town, few kilometres closer are the youngest spas in Slovakia in Nimnica. Town has mostly postmodern architecture meaning that most of the pre-20th-century buildings were replaced in the 1960s and 1980s.

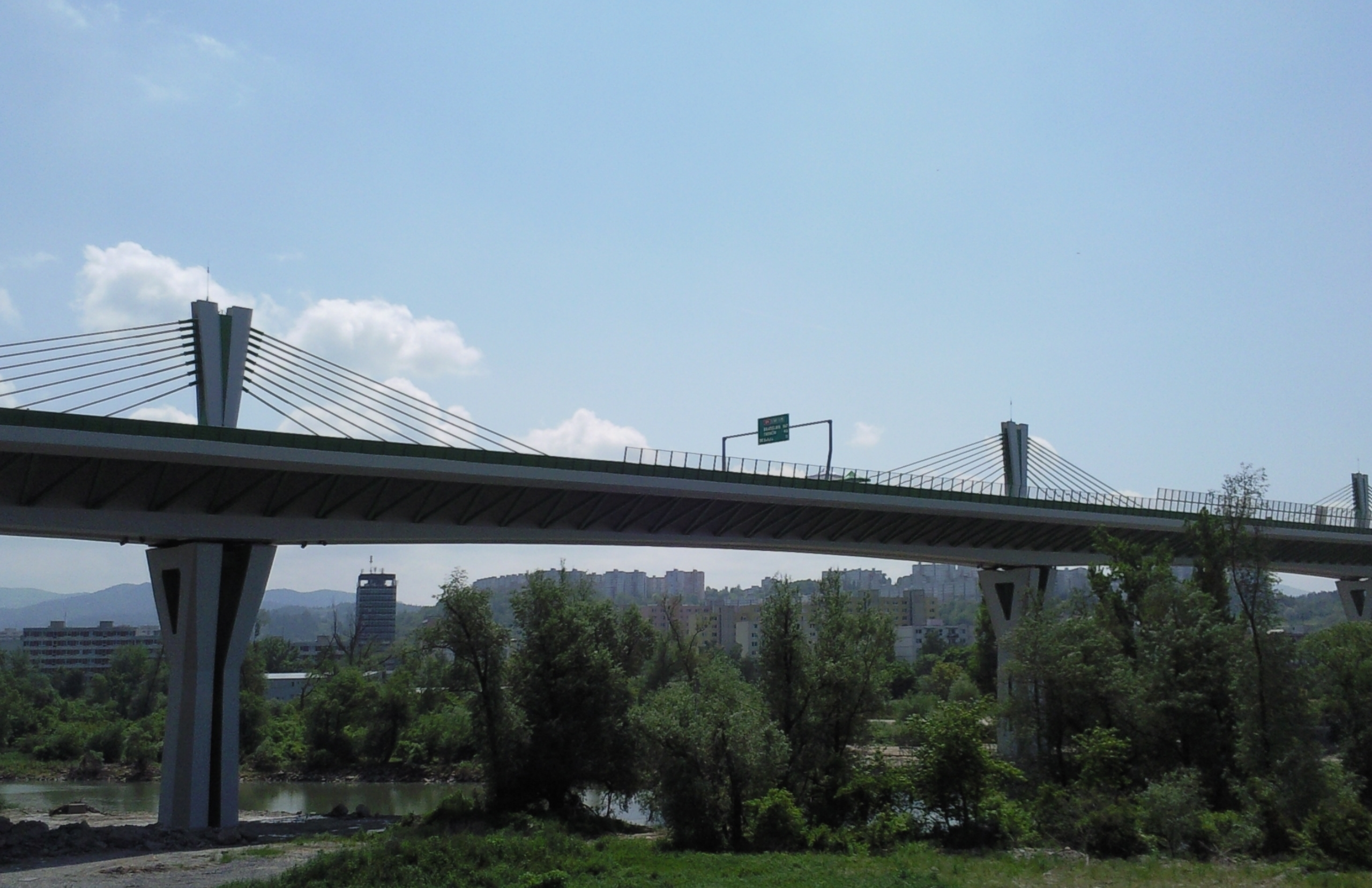
Motorway viaduct above the town

Považská Bystrica lies on the major traffic route Bratislava - Žilina causing many traffic jams in the recent years. The motorway viaduct was built through the narrowest segment of the town, which was opened on 31 May 2010.

Považská Bystrica has 10 twin towns, with the first twin town being Rožnov pod Radhoštěm in the Czech Republic.

== History ==
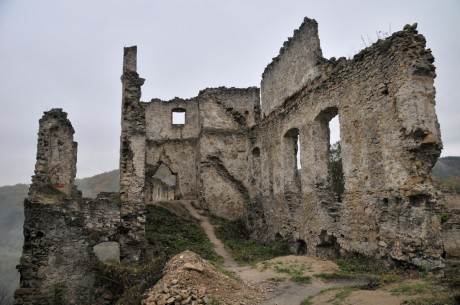
Ruins of Považský hrad castle above the town

The roots of the settlement of the town connect to Baden culture, in addition to Celtic coins were found on the castle cliff supporting the presence of previous settlers. However, the first written reference to the town comes from 1316, in connection with Matthew III Csák. The next known reference about Považská Bystrica is dated 13 July 1330. In 1432, the town was burned by Hussite troops. The history of the town is very closely connected with the nearby Považský hrad castle, built in the 13th century. The most famous owners of the Bystrica castle and the land were knights Ján and Rafael Podmanitzky, known for their robberies. The family of Podmanicki became rulers of the town in 1458 when King Matthias Corvinus of Hungary donated the castle, the town, and 16 surrounding villages to Ladislav Podmanitzky. During their reign, which lasted almost 100 years, the town was flourishing. This was supported by an important document, the Articuli Podmanickyani, which stated the statute of the town and established old Slovak language as the only official language among congildones. No other town, except Považská Bystrica and Varín, had a statute with such provision regarding language use.

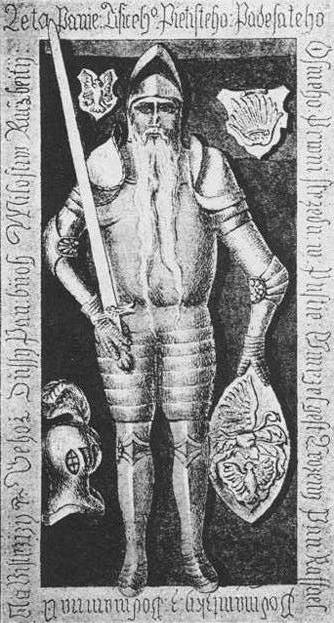
Tombstone of Rafael Podmanitzky.

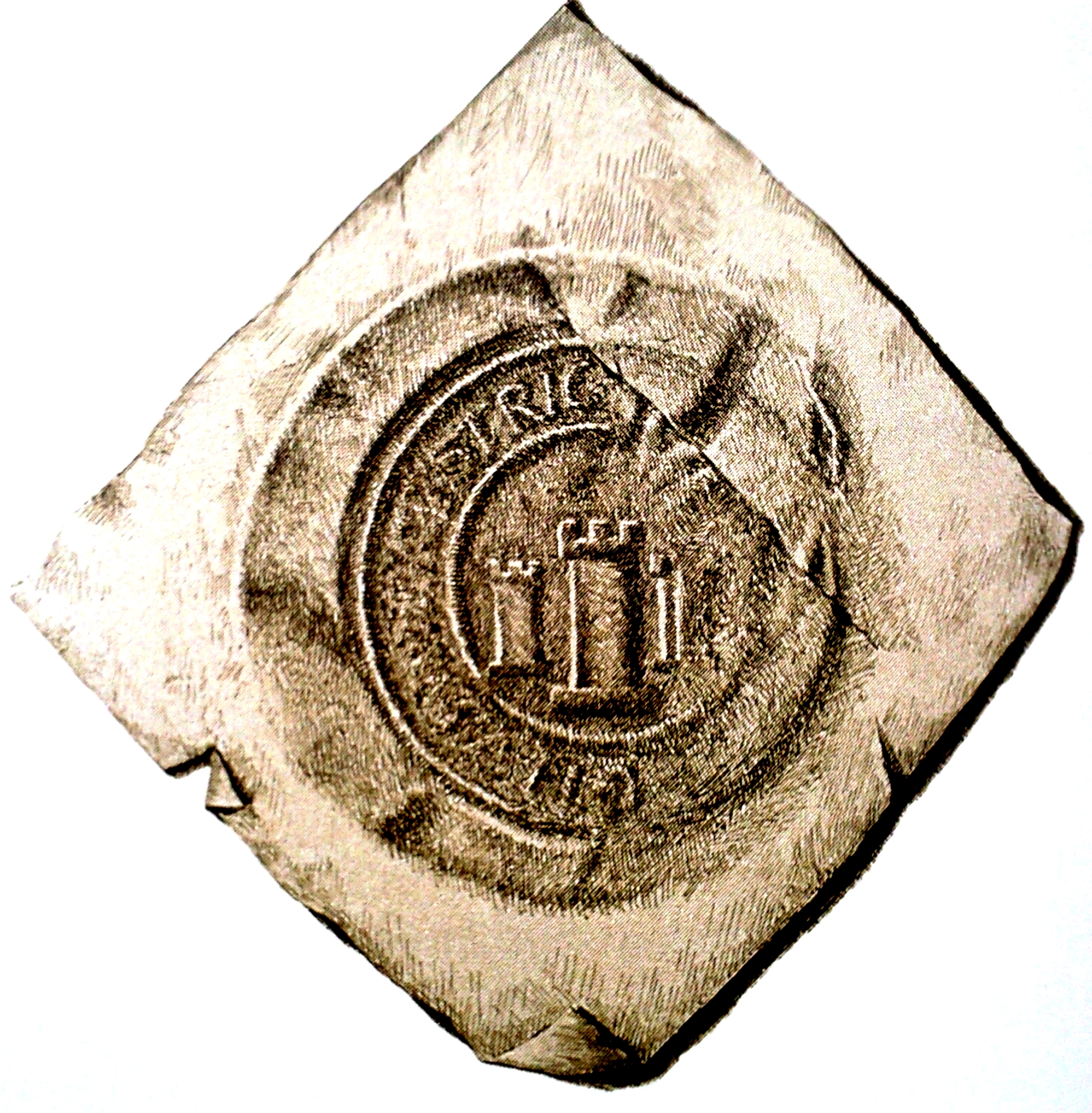
Seal from the 17th century.

As an example of the language could be used engraving on the tombstone of Rafael Podmanitzky in the Church of the Visitation of the Virgin Mary in Považská Bystrica.

The next one hundred years were hard for the town and the region, because of upheavals of several Hungarian noblemen. The town was plundered by troops of Stephen Bocskai (1604), Emeric Thököly (1679), Bereczényi and Očkay (1707). Despite the hard times, the town obtained more and more privileges from Hungarian kings during the period, and it had a significantly higher status than the surrounding countryside. This ended in 1886, when a new Hungarian legislation canceled all the privileges.

In 1918, the town became part of the Czechoslovak Republic. In 1929, an ammunition plant Roth transferred its production from Bratislava to Považská Bystrica, which significantly improved the employment situation. Starting in 1937 and continuing until 1945 rifles (vz.24 and K98k) and small arms ammunition were manufactured here. After World War II the munitions factory at Považská Bystrica continued to produce weapons and ammunition for both the military and for commercial purposes.

Since World War II, and especially in the 1970s and 1980s, the town grew significantly. New residential areas were built around the tiny town center. The town center itself was re-built completely, therefore you can hardly find any historical buildings there now. The main employer since the second world war was the engineering plant Považské strojárne. The plant mainly manufactured scooters and industrial bearings. Since the end of socialism, the company has not prospered. This has caused increased unemployment.

== Population ==
Historical population
Year	Pop.	±%
1970	22,953	—
1980	30,444	+32.6%
1991	40,083	+31.7%
2001	42,773	+6.7%
2011	41,241	−3.6%
2021	38,641	−6.3%
Source: Censuses

Population statistic (10 years)
Year	1995	2005	2015	2025
Count	43,036	42,208	40,373	36,690
Difference		−1.92%	−4.34%	−9.12%

Population statistic
Year	2024	2025
Count	36,961	36,690
Difference		−0.73%

It has a population of 36,690 people (31 December 2025).

=== Ethnicity ===
Census 2021 (1+%)
Ethnicity	Number	Fraction
Slovak	36,253	93.82%
Not found out	2132	5.51%
Total	38,641	

In year 2021 was 38,641 people by ethnicity 36,253 as Slovak, 2132 as Not found out, 386 as Czech, 138 as Other, 57 as Russian, 50 as Hungarian, 32 as Polish, 28 as German, 26 as Rusyn, 24 as Ukrainian, 24 as Moravian, 23 as Romani, 12 as Serbian, 11 as Italian, 11 as English, 6 as Jewish, 6 as Vietnamese, 5 as Canadian, 4 as Silesian, 4 as Korean, 4 as French, 4 as Croatian, 3 as Austrian, 2 as Turkish, 1 as Iranian, 1 as Greek, 1 as Bulgarian and 1 as Albanian.

Note on population: The difference values of population numbers in the table "Population statistic" and in the sections "Ethnicity" & "Religion" is caused by the use of various statistical methods.

=== Religion ===
Census 2021 (1+%)
Religion	Number	Fraction
Roman Catholic Church	25,534	66.08%
None	8785	22.73%
Not found out	2648	6.85%
Evangelical Church	741	1.92%
Total	38,641	

In year 2021 was 38,641 people by religion 25,534 from Roman Catholic Church, 8785 from None, 2648 from Not found out, 741 from Evangelical Church, 184 from Greek Catholic Church, 150 from Ad hoc movements, 139 from Other, 86 from Christian Congregations in Slovakia, 71 from Other and not ascertained christian church, 57 from Eastern Orthodox Church, 51 from Buddhism, 38 from Jehovah's Witnesses, 37 from Paganism and natural spirituality, 34 from Seventh-day Adventist Church, 29 from Calvinist Church, 15 from Islam, 11 from Apostolic Church, 7 from Jewish community, 7 from Hinduism, 6 from Old Catholic Church, 3 from United Methodist Church, 3 from Czechoslovak Hussite Church, 3 from Church of the Brethren, 1 from Church of Jesus Christ of Latter-day Saints and 1 from Bahá'i Community.

== Politics ==
=== Local ===
==== Mayors ====
- Ján Knapo, Independent (1990–1994)
- Ľuboš Lackovič, Movement for a Democratic Slovakia (1994–2006)
- Miroslav Adame, Direction – Social Democracy (2006–2010)
- Karol Janas, Direction – Social Democracy (2010–)

2018 mayoral election
Name	Alliance	Result	
Name	Alliance	Votes	%
Karol Janas	SMER–SNS–SZ	7,294	59.2%
Andrej Péli	Independent	4,401	35.7%
Jaroslav Ševčík	Independent	410	3.3%
Juraj Smatana	SaS–OĽaNO	217	1.8%
Source: SME

* Juraj Smatana resigned from the candidacy and supported Andrej Péli, but remained on the ballot paper.

==== Current Town Parliament ====
Alliance	Seats
SMER–SNS–SZ	10
KDH	5
SaS–OĽaNO–PS	3
SPOLU	1
Independents	6
Source: SME

=== Nationwide ===
==== 2020 parliamentary election ====
Party	Result		% diff.
Party	Nationwide	Pov. Bystrica	% diff.
OĽaNO	25.02% (#1)	21.80% (#2)	–3.22
SMER	18.29% (#2)	22.44% (#1)	+4.15
SR	8.24% (#3)	9.20% (#4)	+0.96
ĽSNS	7.97% (#4)	9.27% (#3)	+1.30
PS–S	6.96% (#5)	7.82% (#5)	+0.86
SaS	6.22% (#6)	6.20% (#6)	–0.02
ZĽ	5.77% (#7)	5.12% (#7)	–0.65
KDH	4.65% (#8)	4.01% (#9)	–0.64
MKÖ–MKS	3.91% (#9)	0.00% (#24)	–3.91
SNS	3.16% (#10)	5.04% (#8)	+1.88
Others	9.81%	9.10%	–0.71
Source: SME

== Interesting places ==
=== Places of history ===
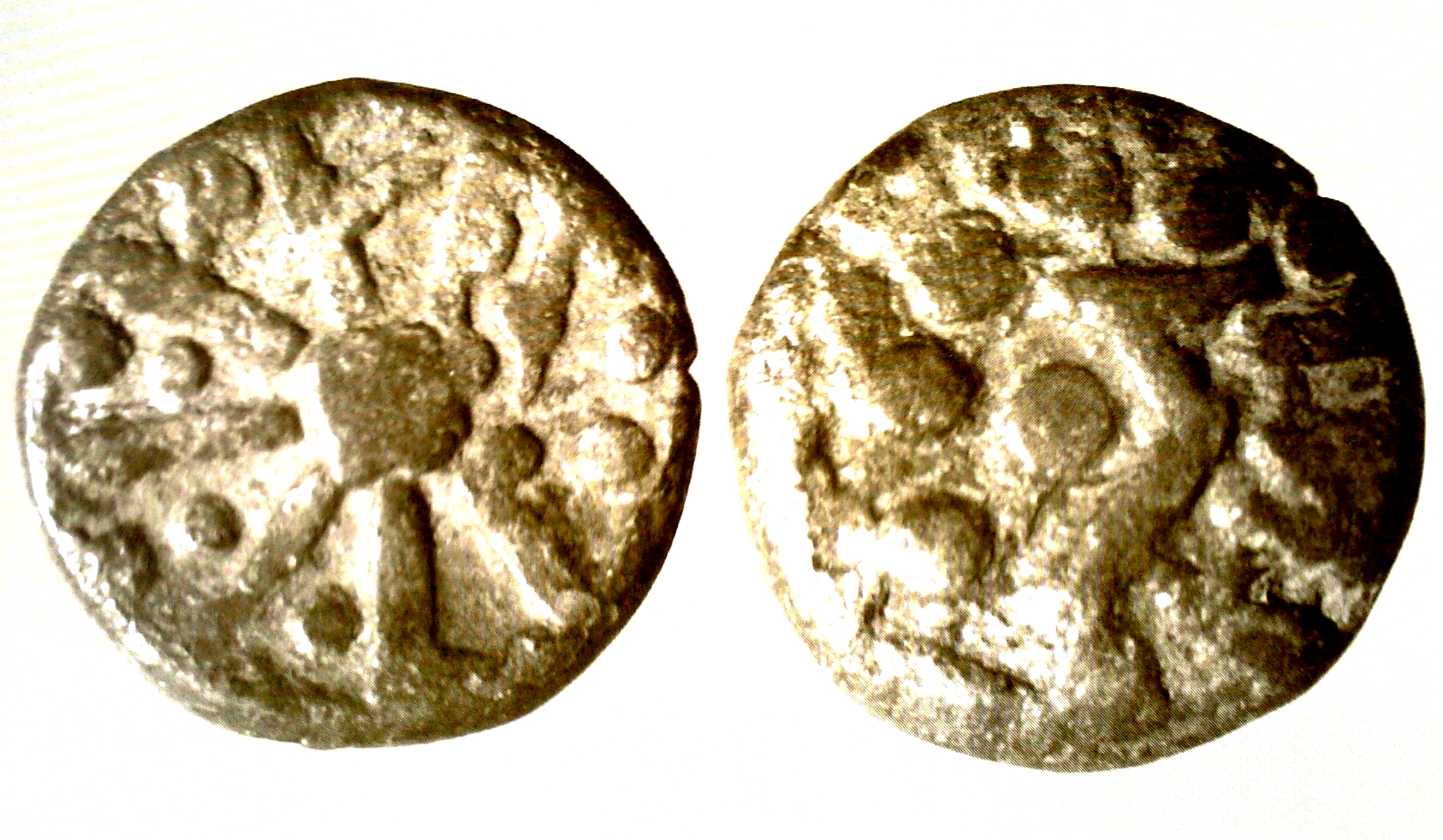
Coins found on the castle cliff, dated to the first century BC.

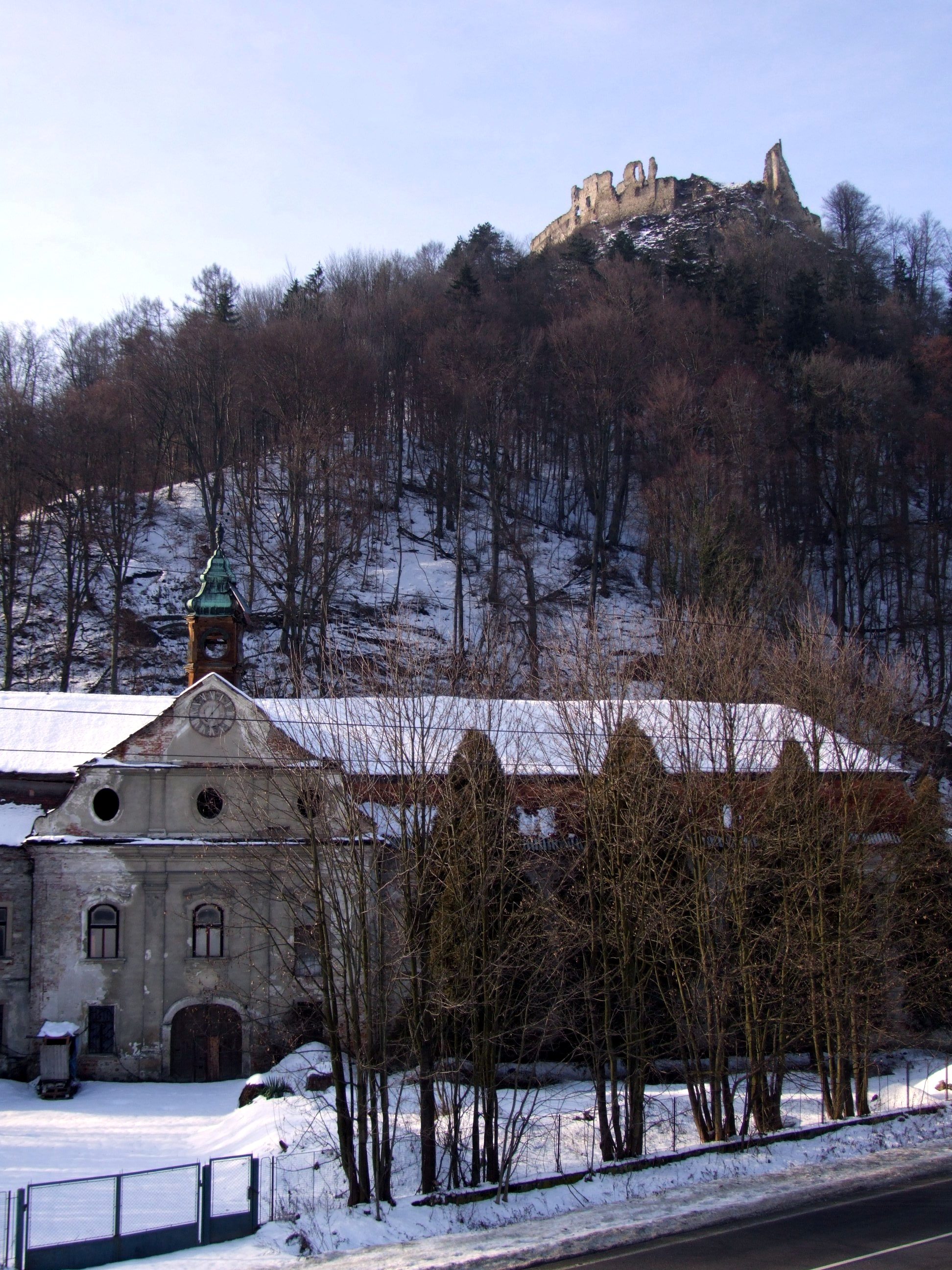
Považský hrad with Száparyovský kaštieľ

==== Považský hrad ====
Považský hrad is a landmark of the town and witness of the history (e.g., Celtic coins were found on the castle cliff). It went through many reconstructions, therefore it represents many different architectural movements. The towers of the town were accepted as the symbols to the coat of arms of the town. Nowadays some minor works are done on the castle by voluntary organization Zdruzenie hradu Bystrica, but castle needs a more complex reconstruction.

==== Burg ====
The Burg was built in the first half of the 17th century, and is representative of Slovak renaissance culture.

==== Church of the Visitation of the Virgin Mary in Považská Bystrica ====
The Church of the Visitation of the Virgin Mary in Povazska Bystrica is the main church in the town, situated in the heart of the town gives the cross section between 14th-century architecture and the architecture of the first half of the 20th century in Slovakia. It was built by Ján Podmanitzky, the owner of the castle in gothic style. In 1913-1914 the tower of the church was covered with baroque "onion like" construction. From the original buildings only the presbytery and the northern perimetric wall still stand. Major reconstruction and enlarging began in 1940. Church's windows are filled with colourful stained glass filling created by Slovak artist Vincent Hložník and his wife Viera Hložníková in 1951. In front of the church is a sandstone statue of saint Mary to which church is dedicated. Inside are epitaphs of Zigmund Balassa, Alzbeta Zborovska, tombstone of Rafael Podmaintzky remains of caryatids and the depiction of the old town on the Balassa tombstone.

==== Orlové manor house ====
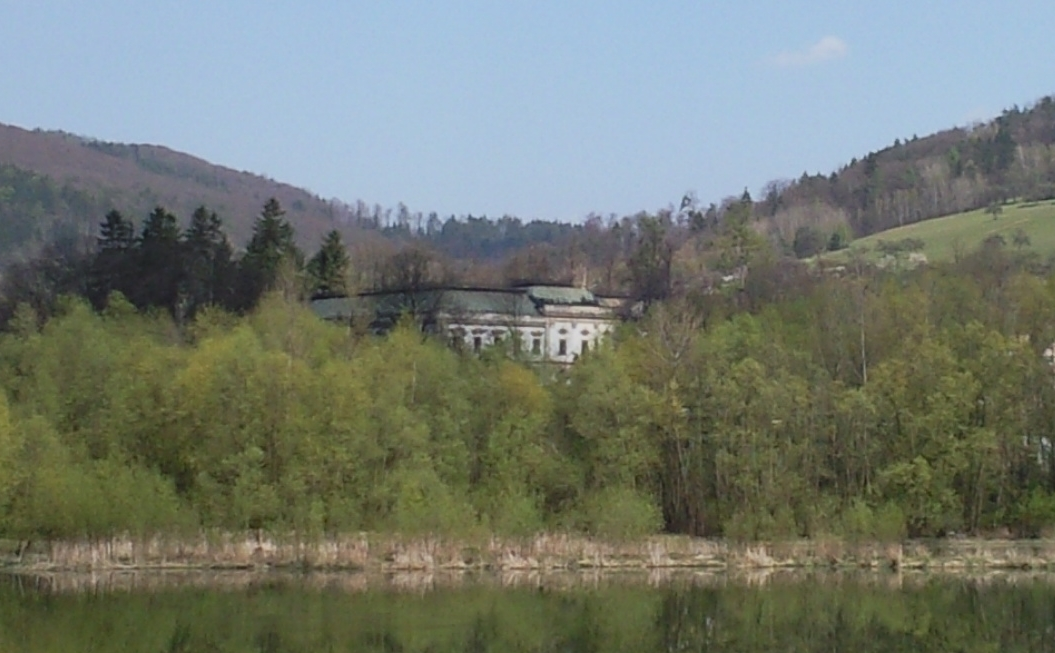
Manor house Orlové

Orlové manor-house was built in 1612 by the Hungarian noble, Žigmund Balassa. Originally, it was a Renaissance single-storey manor-house which was supposed to bring the promise of new, modern and comfortable living for the aristocratic Balassa family, which the cold and uninviting Považský castle could no longer provide. At the time, it was quite common for the nobility to abandon their castles – unconquerable, stone fortresses whose defensive function has lost their meaning – and to build modern, comfortable family seats in the town or countryside. The manor-house was then known as Zsigmond Háza, or Žigmund's house.

At the beginning of the 18th century, renovation works turned the manor-house into a two-storey four-wing manor. Another important owner who had a large impact on the manor-house's appearance was Pavol Balassa, the great-grandson of its founder. In the first half of the 18th century, he together with his wife, Juliana Batthyány reconstructed the manor-house in a grandiose Baroque style. The park and courtyard with its fountain were also added at the time. We can read about this reconstruction on the commemorative inscription above the manor-house's entrance gate. In the entrance gateway, we can see the alliance coat of arms of the Balassa and Bathyány families. Both family coats of arms are joined by the imperial crown expressing thanks to Maria Theresa and the imperial court for confirming the Balassa family's title of count.

One of the most precious parts of the manor-house is the late Baroque chapel of St. John of Nepomuk with its Rococo interior, built between 1770 and 1780. The chapel takes up two storeys in the manor-house's west wing. The Balassa family owned this grand family seat for a long 250 years. Later, it had several owners, not of all which were of benefit to the manor-house or its surroundings. At the beginning of the 20th century, the manor house was owned for several years by the Czech violin virtuoso and composer Jan Kubelík.

Before World War II, Orlové manor-house became the residence of Klementin Ružička, the General Director of Zbrojovka Brno, the largest armory in Czech-Slovak region. He moved to the palace Orlové together with his family. Opposed to his predecessors, previous owners of the palace Orlove, he resided there permanently. During his tenure he cared a lot to preserve the palace identity and its architecture style.

In Socialistic period of the Slovak history, Orlové manor-house became the property of the state and served as an administrative building of the local archive, later, as a dormitory for season workers, after all, as a local museum.

A four-star hotel Gino Park Palace is settled in Orlové manor-house nowadays. It offers a high standard luxury accommodation, restaurant services and events all year around.

==== Kalvária Považská Bystrica ====
Kalvaria in Povazska Bystrica was mostly destroyed during the socialist era. It has 11 stops leading to the main Chapel of Saint Magdalene on the top of the hill. Last reconstruction of the monument was done in 1937. In spite of its present state, it is a part of national heritage. In the chapel of Saint Magdalene there were the statues of Jesus and two men on the hill Golgotha, but because of the situation statues were moved to the main town church.

==== Manor Považské Podhradie ====
Szapáry Castle is a rococo style building with granary and system of outbuildings, below the castle. A chapel was built inside between 1763 and 1764. The chapel was reconstructed in 1960. In the interior of the manor house were rococo paintings, stone coats of arms.

==== Chapel of Saint Helena ====
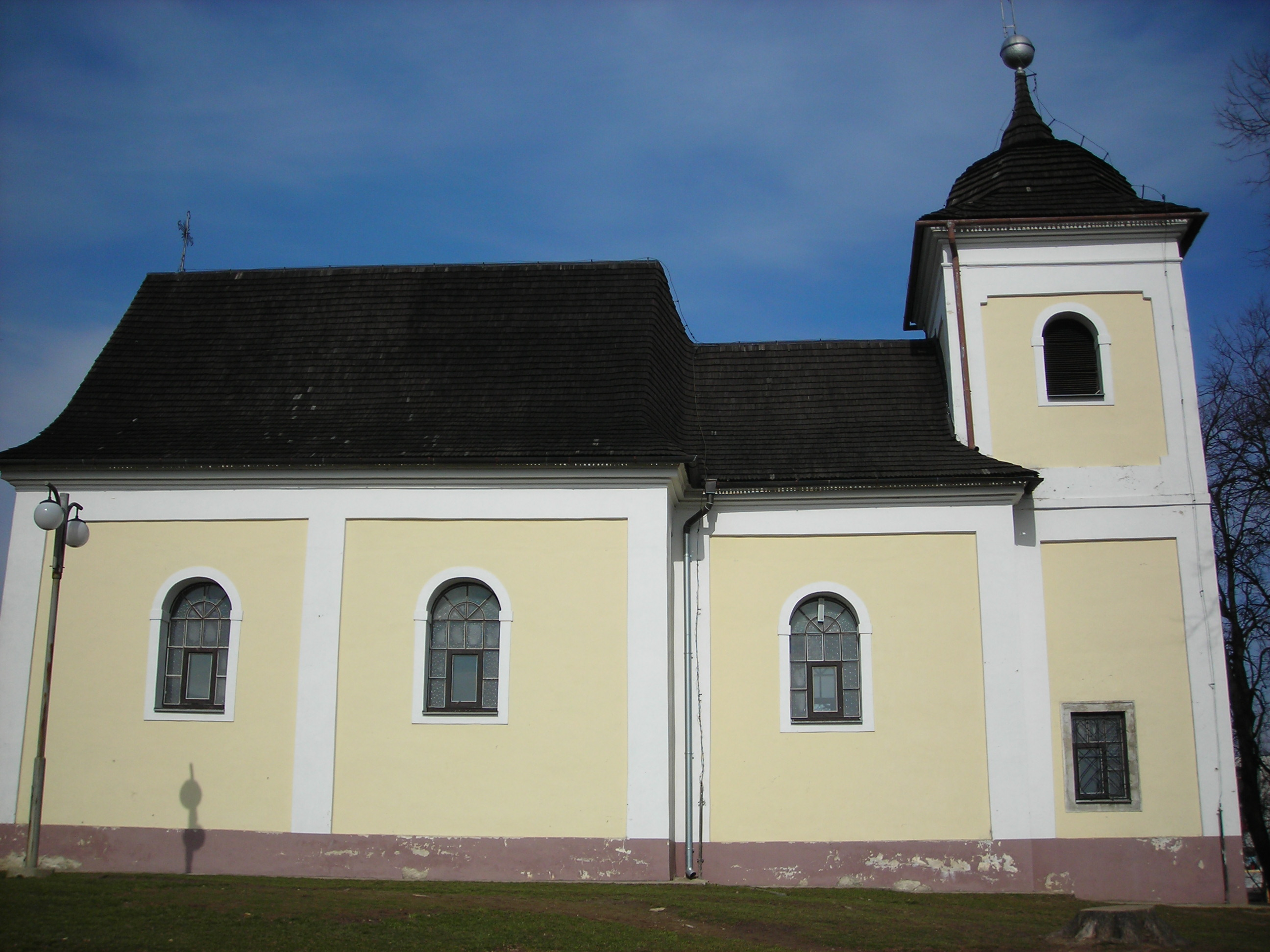
Chapel of Saint Helena in Považská Bystrica

The Chapel of Saint Helena was built in 1728 by count Peter Szaparay on the hill above the town. It is surrounded by lindens, of which one is more than 250 years old. The chapel was robbed and became a ruin until it was renewed in the 1990s.

==== Kostol Svätého Ladislava ====
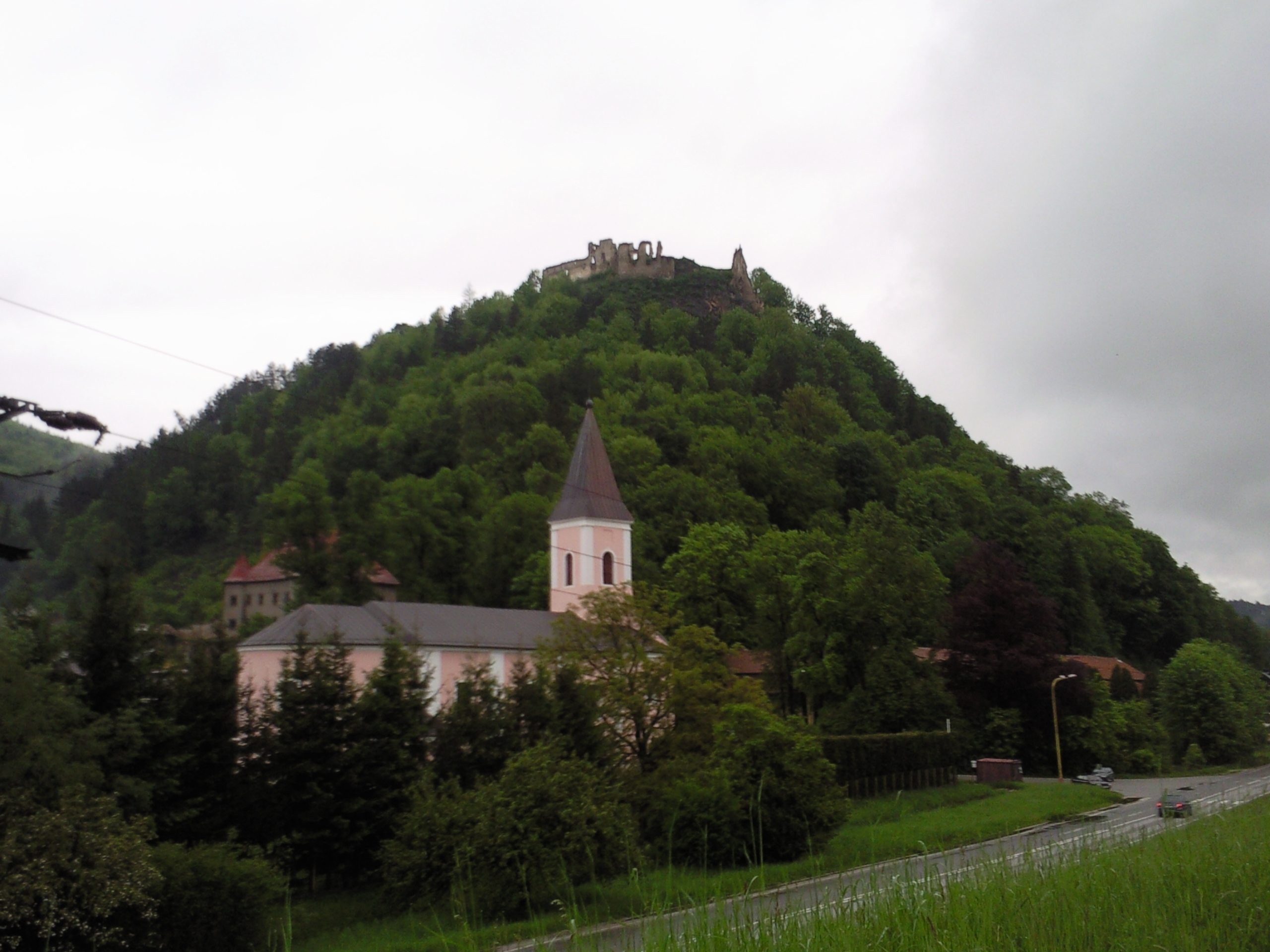
Kostol Sv. Ladislava

Kostol sv. Ladislava v Považskom Podhradí is the last fourth member of the four historical buildings build nearby the castle, creating the panorama of Povazske Podhradie. It was built in the 19th century. In the premises of the church is statue of John of Nepomuk, which was coincidentally brought to Považské Podhradie on abandoned flatboat during floods in 1784. After the floods the statue was placed on the place of its founding with five lindens around. However, after some time lindens grew together forming one massive linden tree. From this point people started to idolize the linden with the statue as a wonder of nature until the linden was cut down during the building of new manmade basin of the river Vah.

=== Nature ===
==== Manínska tiesňava ====
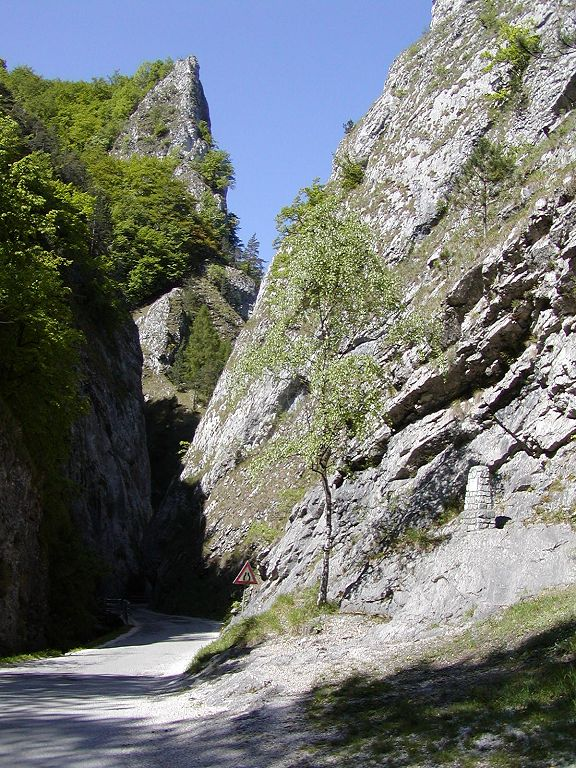
Manínska tiesňava

Manínska tiesňava is the narrowest canyon in Slovakia, lying 6 kilometres from Považská Bystrica. It is place of great tourist interest, because of its wild and rare flora and fauna. It is frequently visited by rock climbers.

=== Modern architecture ===
==== Estakáda ====
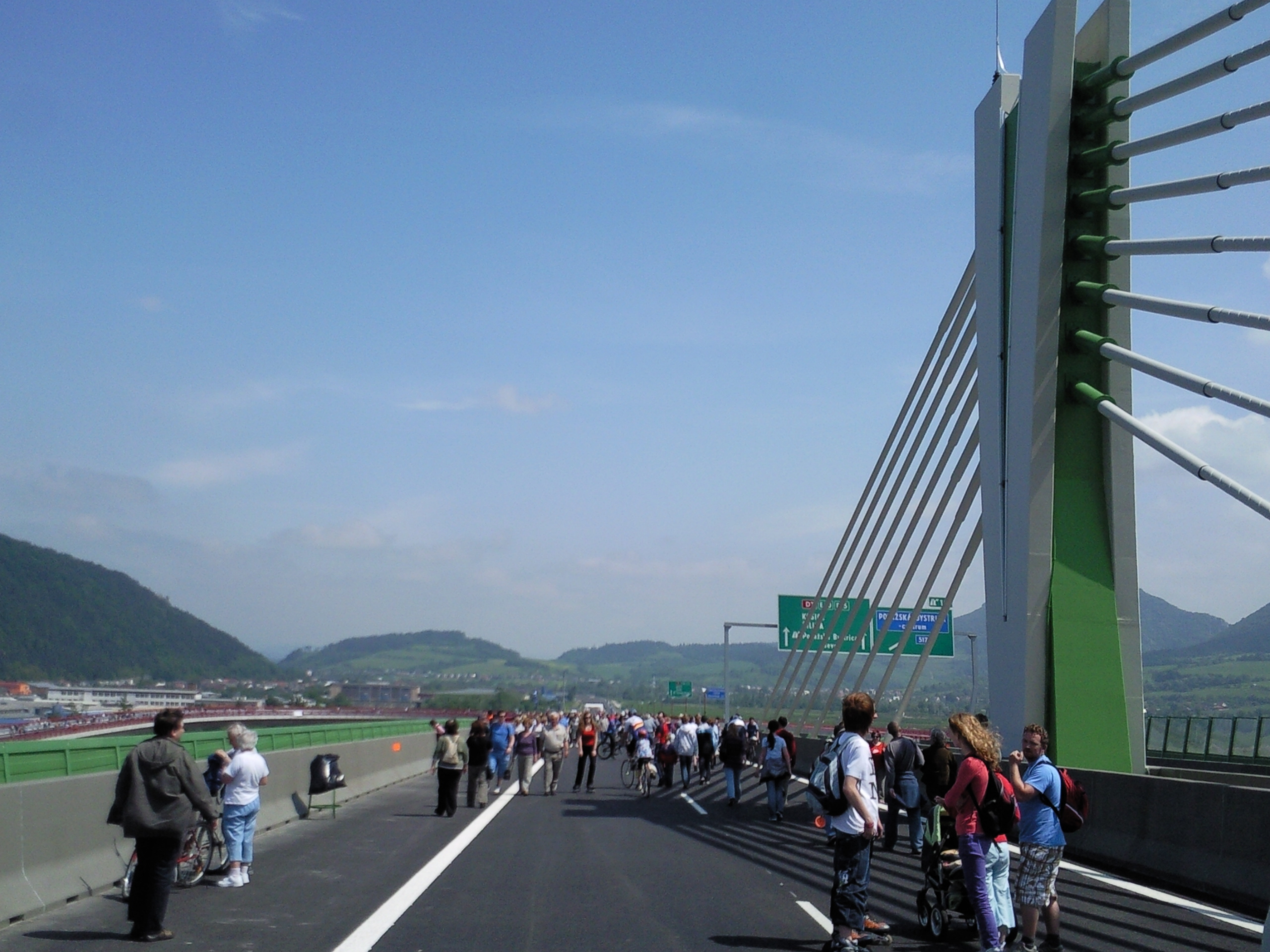
Opening day of the Estakáda viaduct

The Motorway viaduct, due to its size, conception and short time of building, can be counted between the top structures of civil engineering in Slovakia. On 31 May 2010 the town viaduct was opened for traffic use.

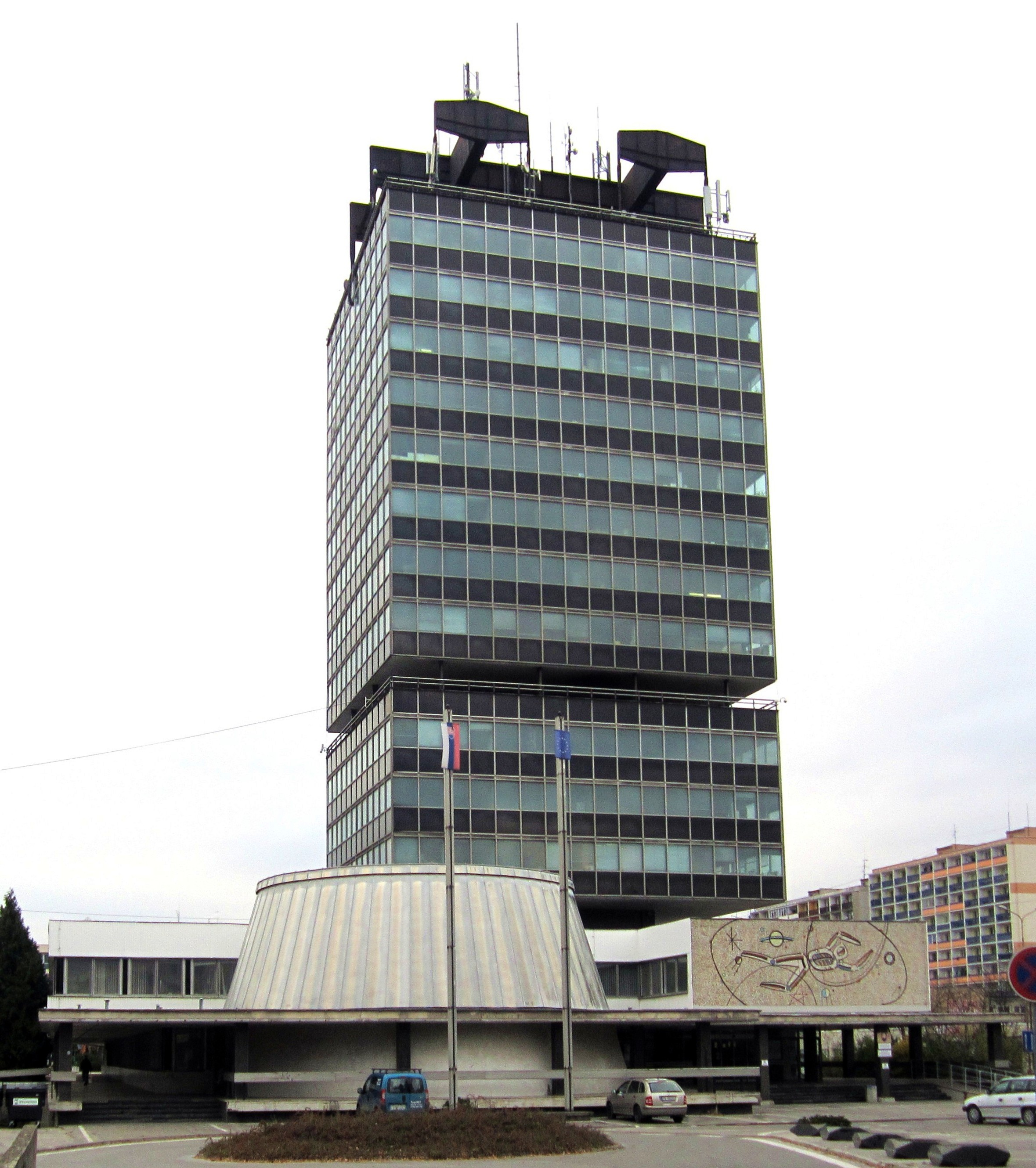
ABŠO

==== Administrative building of executive agencies (ABŠO) ====
The ABŠO administrative building in Považská Bystrica was constructed in the 1960s. The structure combines standard office and hotel design elements with a lightweight exterior shell and technical construction features. Included in the Docomomo international register for the protection of modern architectural heritage, the building was noted for its structural design within Czechoslovak architecture of the era.

==== Building of RVP (Tatra banka building) ====
The Building of Tatra banka is one of the few traces left of old town centre which was demolished in seventies. It is the most important example of interwar modern architecture building in town. It is included in the list of monuments of the town.

== Boroughs ==
Považská Bystrica has 9 boroughs. 75% of population live in the town, most of them in the apartment blocks. 25% of the population live in the villages. Boroughs:

- Centrum
- Dedovec
- Hliny
- Kolónia

- Lány
- Rozkvet
- Stred
- SNP

- Zákvašov

Villages near Považská Bystrica: Dolny and Horny Milochov, Jelšové, Industrial zone, Šuvarovce.

Other settlements within the district: Belažská Kopanica, Cingelov laz, Dvorského laz, Galanovce, Chodnické, Krekáčov laz, Líškovie laz, Matúšsky laz, Rybárikov laz, Tomankovci a Trnovie laz.

== Notable people ==
- Irena Blühová (1904-1991) social photographer and educator
- Peter Holka (1950) – writer
- Janko Kroner (1956) – actor
- Ľubomír Luhový (1967) – football player
- Michal Mertiňák (1979) – tennis player
- Andrej Meszároš (1985) – professional ice hockey player
- Dorota Nvotová (1982) – actress and singer
- János Podmanitzky (16th century) Archbishop of Zagreb
- István Podmanitzky (1480–1530) Archbishop of Nitra crowned János Szapolyai and Ferdinand I as the kings of the country.
- Michal Maximilián Scheer (1902–2000) – functionalist architect
- Dominik Tatarka (1913–1989) – writer born in Plevník-Drieňové (Považská Bystrica district)
- Marián Vajda (1965) – tennis player, competed in the Olympic Games of Barcelona, Novak Djokovic coach
- Imro Weiner-Kráľ (1901) – painter

== NGOs ==
In the town there are working some small local organizations trying to influence it

- Bystricykel
- Zdruzenie hradu Bystrica

== Twin towns — sister cities ==
Považská Bystrica is twinned with:

- Bačka Palanka, Serbia
- Bełchatów, Poland
- Gjorče Petrov, North Macedonia
- Holešov, Czech Republic
- Rožnov pod Radhoštěm, Czech Republic
- Schekino, Russia
- Sovetsk, Russia
- Tauragė, Lithuania
- Zhodzina, Belarus
- Zubří, Czech Republic

== Climate ==
Považská Bystrica has a humid continental climate (Cfb in the Köppen climate classification).

Climate data for Považská Bystrica
Month	Jan	Feb	Mar	Apr	May	Jun	Jul	Aug	Sep	Oct	Nov	Dec	Year
Mean daily maximum °C (°F)	-0 (32)	2.2 (36.0)	7.3 (45.1)	14 (57)	18.1 (64.6)	21.5 (70.7)	23.3 (73.9)	23.2 (73.8)	18.2 (64.8)	12.5 (54.5)	6.9 (44.4)	1.4 (34.5)	12.4 (54.3)
Daily mean °C (°F)	−2.9 (26.8)	−1.2 (29.8)	3.2 (37.8)	9.2 (48.6)	13.7 (56.7)	17.3 (63.1)	19.1 (66.4)	18.8 (65.8)	14.1 (57.4)	8.8 (47.8)	4.1 (39.4)	−1 (30)	8.6 (47.5)
Mean daily minimum °C (°F)	−6 (21)	−4.5 (23.9)	−1 (30)	3.7 (38.7)	8.5 (47.3)	12.2 (54.0)	14.2 (57.6)	13.9 (57.0)	9.7 (49.5)	5.2 (41.4)	1.4 (34.5)	−3.4 (25.9)	4.5 (40.1)
Average precipitation mm (inches)	60 (2.4)	55 (2.2)	63 (2.5)	64 (2.5)	89 (3.5)	93 (3.7)	103 (4.1)	80 (3.1)	79 (3.1)	61 (2.4)	65 (2.6)	63 (2.5)	875 (34.6)
Source: Climate Data
