= Chapel of Saint Helena =

The Chapel of Saint Helena could refer to:

- Chapel of Saint Helena, Betlehem
- Chapel of Saint Helena, Slovakia
- Chapel of Saint Helena, Jerusalem

== See also ==
- Chapel of St Helen, in Wicken Bonhunt, England
- St Helen's Chapel in Colchester, England.
