= Kalvaria Povazska Bystrica =

Coordinates: 49°6′49.45″N 18°27′33.81″E

Kalvaria Považská Bystrica
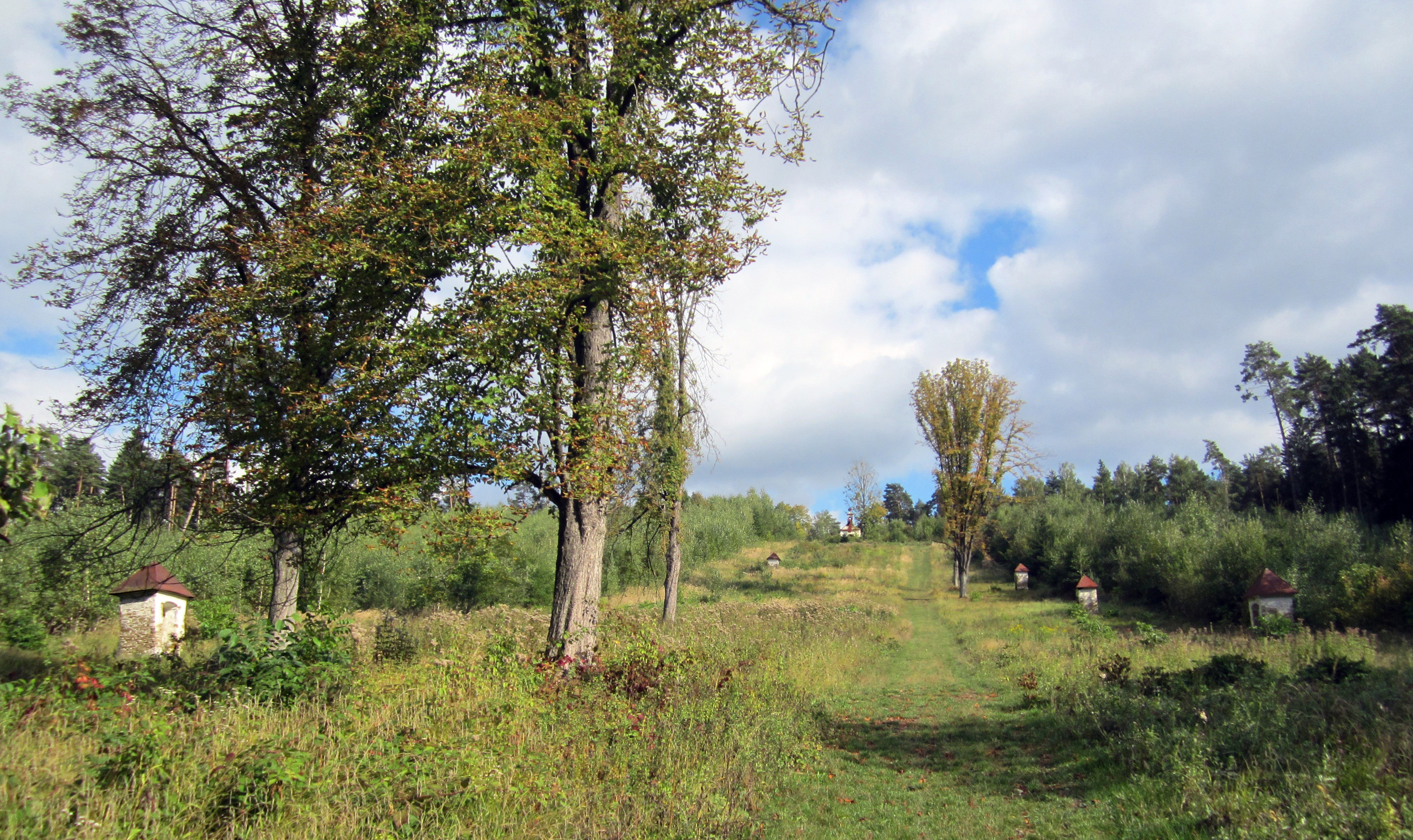
- Interactive map of the Kalvaria Považská Bystrica area

General information
- Type: Church property
- Location: Považská Bystrica, Trenčiansky, Považská Bystrica, Slovakia
- Opened: 1807

Kalvaria Považská Bystrica (Slovak pronunciation: [ˈkalʋarɪɐ ˈpɔʋaʂskaː ˈbistritsa] is a collection of fourteen buildings, of which thirteen are chapels, situated in Slovakia depicting the journey of Jesus Christ through to his crucifixion.

== History ==
The complex was built from 1805 to 1807. At the time of its construction, the head clergyman in Považská Bystrica was Joseph Bobošík (also spelled Bobossék). A treaty was signed on 8 June 1807 by Tomas Lovišek, the mayor of the city, which set out to establish a community that would maintain and refurbish the complex. The buildings themselves were rebuilt twice; the first time being in the second half of the 19th century, and the latter being in 1937.

However, the site has fallen into disrepair; several chapels are now defunct, and the main chapel of Mary Magdalene has a dilapidated roof and holes in the wall, causing leaks. The location is seen as a valuable national monument and several amateur restoration attempts are underway. In the 1990s, the sculpture of the crucifixion was restored and transferred to the Church of the Visitation of the Virgin Mary. In 2011, the local government of Považská Bystrica along with the parish clergy of the town announced the commencement of an official reconstruction program.

In 2015, the roof and walls of the Chapel of Mary Magdalene was restored by the local parish. Much of the vegetation was removed in order to comply with the rules of heritage preservation in the country.

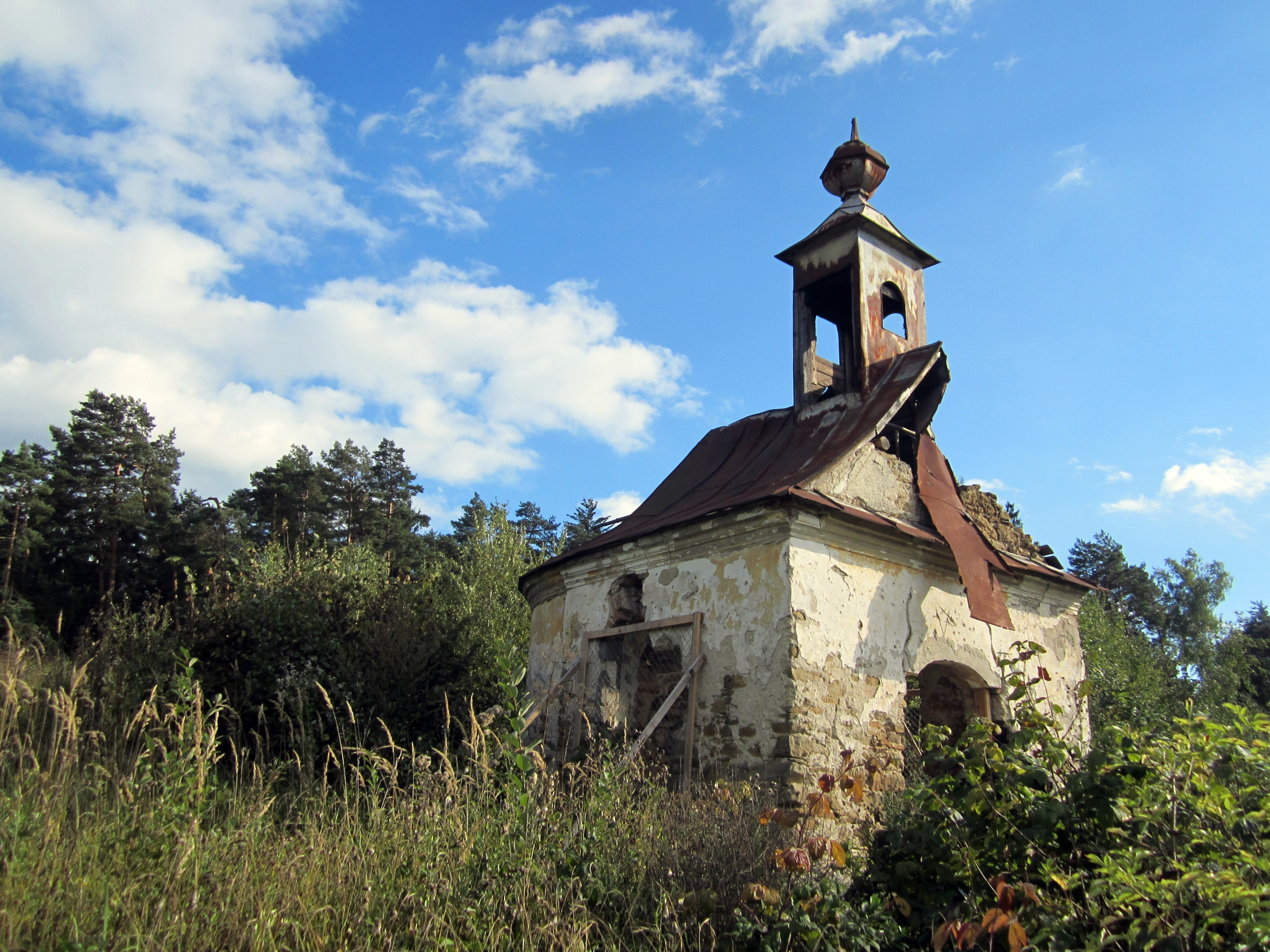
Chapel of Mary Magdalene (before renovation)

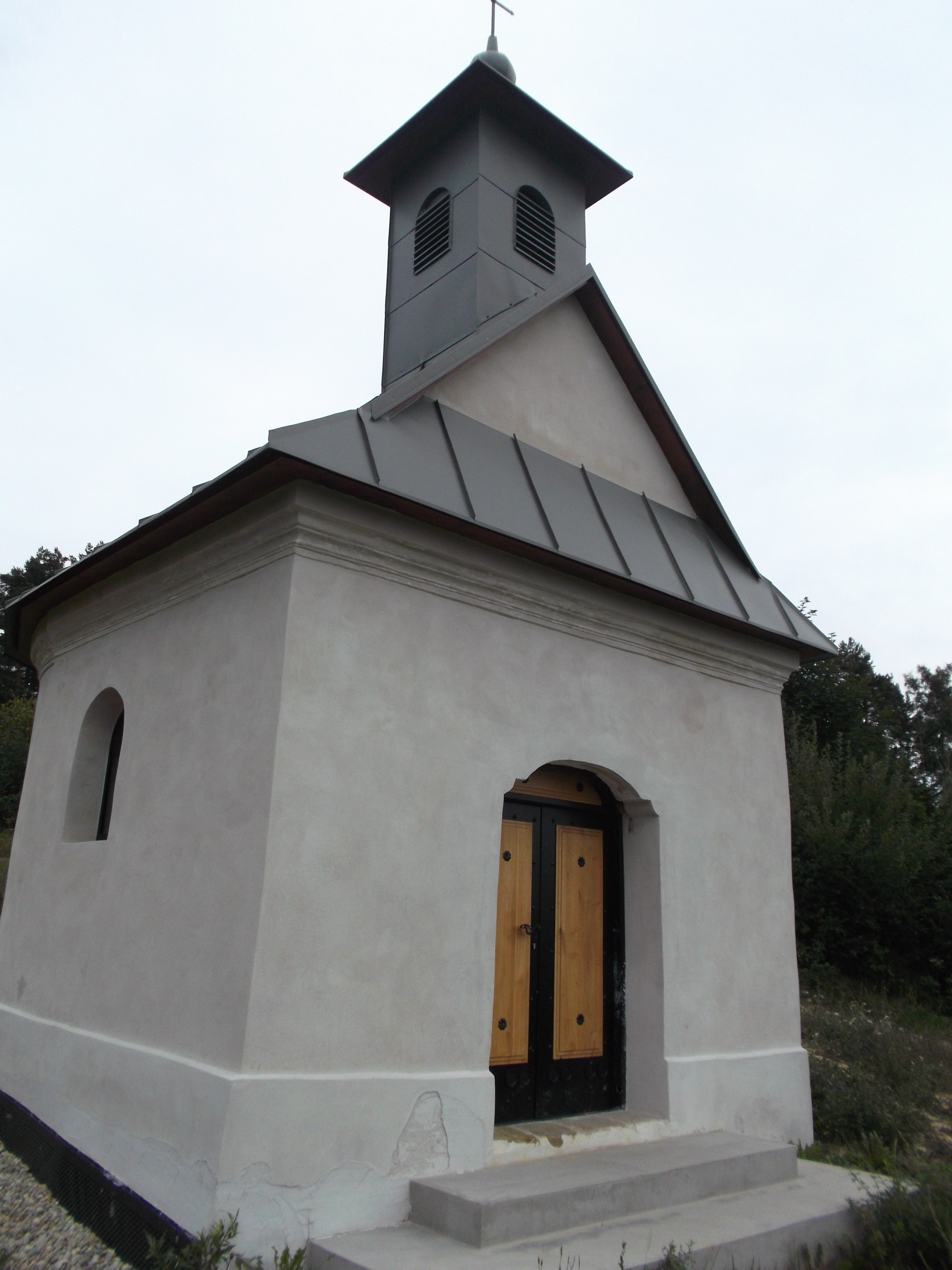
Chapel of Mary Magdalene (2015 renovation)

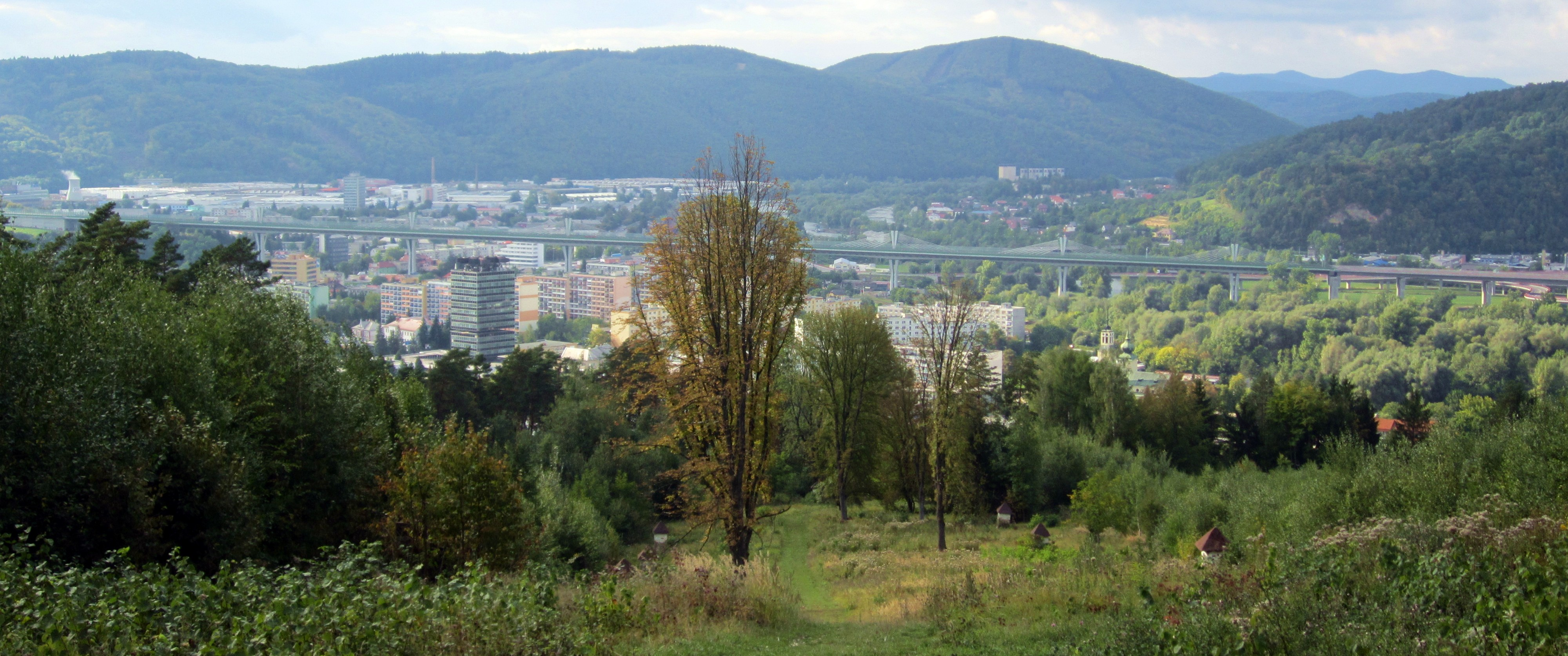
View of the town from the complex
