= Articuli Podmanickyani =

- Created: 2 January 1506
- Location: Vagh-Besztercz, Kingdom of Hungary (now Považská Bystrica, Slovakia)
- Author: János Podmanitzky

Articuli Podmanickyani is a document issued by the bishop of Nitra, and Zagreb, advisor of King Vladislaus II and landlord of Považský hrad (Hungarian: Vágbeszterce vára) János Podmanitzky. The document officially states the relationship between landlords and subjects in the town of Považská Bystrica. While establishing "new" orders, the document indirectly shows conditions of customary life as observed by Articuli. Notably, after its initial publishing in Latin, Podmanitzky also translated the document into Slovak, which was a relatively rare occurrence at that time. The Latin and Slovak versions are both preserved to this day.

== Contents of the document ==
1. It is appointed that all the arable lands of the town should be divided into 52 povrazec (Latin: funis: a medieval measure unit equally roughly 30m, in modern square measures such a piece of land would have an area of 15-30 ha), and not more and that in the town there should be 52 houses lived by more august commoners, among those 52 povrazec of land should be divided. The row of these houses permitted to own land started from the then house of blacksmith Pavol Masak (Mašek), on the street named Hlinik. On the other side of the Bystric river, the row ended up by where Petrik lived. Then, on the other side starting with merchant Baltazar's house, which was near the street that leads to the grove, the forest of the town, all the way to the house on the corner, where Skala lived, then it curved around the baths back up to the river. The next segment started from the house where then lived Kráľ, and ended by the house which was near the house of Uhlík. And these were 52 houses to which belonged the mentioned lands, one povrazec to each. The landlord cannot in any case take this land belonging to these houses away. If anyone wants to sell their house, among the mentioned houses, he must sell it with the land and no other way; and if someone of the commoners wants to sell a house he shall sell it for a suitable price. If with the buyer they cannot agree, the reeve and the sworn shall appraise (the house), and it should be sold based on this appraisal.
2. The reeve and sworn shall be elected by votes from only these 52 (houses) and none other.
3. Because in all of the past until now tax to the landlord was paid always just by the 52 houses or povrazec, therefore from now on forever it shall be paid from 52 houses or povrazec.
4. (it is ordered for) The reeve and sworn to govern the society of commoners, and not the community of the reeve and sworn, which should act based on their belief (conscience).
5. In the event that anyone wants to build a house, either of those owners of the 52 houses, or from those settling in gardens, so those 52 owning a povrazec, should bring to those who are building suitable wood for construction and then gardeners (living in gardens, therefore owning only a smaller agricultural piece of land) should along with cotters help build, other jobs meant for carpenters shall be the duty of the one building the house. And commoners shall let every new builder (build).
6. During the operation of taverns and tap of wine and beer it s ordered to be observed that no one may tap wine and beer only those, who are part of the (mentioned) 52. Wineries are not multiple (only one), with the exception of the market, because the tapping of wine is passed from one to another; if someone wishes to sell wine, he shall call the reeve and as many sworn as can then come; they taste the wine and set the price, for which the wine may be sold or tapped. And every one of the commoners or their successors, who will sell wine, should put into the town's treasury one ort (one fourth of a zlaty). If someone (of the commoners) was so poor, that they could not tap wine, they shall sell the order of their right to another for one ort.
7. Similarly none other than the mentioned 52 can process malt and brew beer or draft it; always may (at one time draft beer) only 5 people, with the exception of the time of the market. In the time of the market, two weeks before it ant two weeks after it, every (commoner) has the right to sell and tap wine and beer; the drafting of beer also passes from one to another, same as with wine. If anyone of the commoners brewed beer and wanted to sell or draft it, after the inspection of the reeve and sworn it is decided, how much malt was bought for one zlaty (ťlorén) and depending on it such a rate (amount) of produced front (first-class) beer, for which one zlaty is paid, so the one who brewed it, gains back his expenses. For every zlaty earned from drafting front (first-class) beer, is paid (to the town's treasury) one ort; back (second-class) beer should be sold for a lower price, and sediment, commonly known as "mláto", he has for himself. Whoever of the commoners will draft beer, is to give to the school for the teachers two large tankards of beer, those which water is usually carried. If someone, who as was said before about the tapping of wine, could not for poverty brew or draft beer, (he) should for half an ort sell his drafting equipment to another. No one may to another give, or tap either wine or beer on a loan.
8. When butchers kill livestock to sell, the reeve and two sworn together with two commoners from the community shall make sure, that those who are killing the livestock do so in a way prescribed in this fashion; if the livestock is killed, it must be skinned and its intestines be taken out, legs along with the head be removed, only then the meat is placed on a scale and it is decided, for how many denars one pound shall be sold, and that id done in such a way, that only for the meat the butcher gets his buying price, the skin, tallow and half of the intestines are his profit and (the other) half of the intestines belongs to the reeve, the two sworn and the two commoners for their stay. The tongue of the livestock shall be given as an alms for the students of the school; if the tongue does not want to be given, an amount of meat which can be bought for the tongue shall be given.
9. From the revenue of the town should no money ever for any reason be loaned, or be spent by commoners, rather it should be gathered every year and stored, so the town always has some money deferred, because one sixth of these funds provides for gifts to the landlord and others, who deserve to be honoured with a gift. In the case, if those, whose responsibility these funds are, use of them more than one sixth or throw them around, shall be stripped of trust and honour, even physically punished for their acts as thieves and bandits. If someone wished to do business with the money from the (town's) income, the reeve and sworn are to give him, but under good guaranty of the guarantor and such a businessperson is to give after one year back to the town back the borrowed money and some more; and all he is to hand over openly under supervision of the reeve and sworn.
10. No one of the commoners or residents may play with dice and cards, with the exception of lordly servants and noblemen staying within the city.
11. A bather, who knew how to perform bloodletting, shall regularly pay the town from the bathhouse annually one zlaty worth of tax. For one bloodletting he was to be given four royal denar (1 zlaty=100 denars). For one venesection he should be given one Vienna denar, for one bathing customer one royal denar, and for bathing of a woman one obulus and no more. From the families of the guests (residents), every one of the guests is to bring the bather one barrow of wood and for that to the family will be given free baths for the whole year. If there appeared any needs or deficiencies with the bath, they need to be removed using the town's funds.
12. Every resident of the town, whether they own a povrazec or nor, whether lives in gardens or is a cotter, must annually spend four days personally and with their carriage and mantle (if they have one), partaking in reinforcing the bank of the river Váh (Vág), to prevent the river from damaging the town.
13. It is appointed that none of the citizens are to make an appeal to the court in Krupina (Korpona) (there was a court to which anyone from inhabitants of either Bystrica or Žilina (Zsolna) could take appeal), with the exception of death penalties and cases connected with a person's dignity. No one has in their interest to make an appeal before his case was decided by the county court with the supervision of the lord or his representative.
14. No one, of the ones who live in this town in the gardens, is to pay the dika (national tax).
15. All residents of the town, whether owners of povrazec, or living in gardens, have the free right to bake bread, under the condition that the dough for one (loaf of) bread will have the same weight as the price of one denar, or then a common currency.
16. Because anyone in Žilina (Zsolna) or in Rajec has the right to build a frame for the sprawling of a cloth, the commoners (of Bystrica), as with other residents and clothiers, may also build frames in places which they find convenient.
17. The street of clothiers should be the one near the church, the residence of blacksmiths should be on the street leading from Moštenec, (residence of) bootmakers from the street called Hliník. Because the town of Bystrica has the same privileges as towns Žilina (Zsolna) and Rajec, clothiers form the town Bystrica should use and be glad for the same privileges and may (also) have their own guild.
18. Cotters living in the city are required to work for the landlord and his successors 3 days per year.
19. On the opposite side (of the Váh) and from the other side of the Bystrica stream, where the castle is, no one shall catch hares or any birds.
20. People living in the town are free to catch fish with nets called sak and veter in the Váh.
21. Those who live in Bystrica do not have to pay taxes to their landlord, except for those who transport wine to Bytča (Nagybiccse) and Žilina (Zsolna). During the time of the market, neither residents nor sellers (who travel between different markets) pay any tax.
22. "King’s lunch" which the commoners had to give to the landlord, they are no longer obligated to give.
23. Manor Hrbotin (now part of the town) is in possession of the town.
24. People from Bystrica from now on do not have to plough or do other work for the castle, with the exception of stacking wine bottles in the castle, mowing of meadows in Kvašove, and working on repairing of the bridge.
25. Those who only hold gardens and not povrazec, are obligated to give and pay from them ten denar to the town and no more shall be asked of them.

The landlord of Vágbeszterce (Považská Bystrica) has adopted the document and inhabitants of Bystrica have committed to keep these rules precisely. As thanks to their landlord for settling the rules so clearly, inhabitants have committed to giving 100 zlaty, 100 gbel (a gbel is a medieval measure of capacity: 1 gbel = 84 litres) and 50 dead roosters annually to the landlord and his heirs. Those living on the fields have to give two dead roosters. If anyone does not respect these rules, especially those concerning wine and beer, that person would be deprived of dignity and could not become a member of the burgesses. If anyone were to break the other rules, that person would have to pay half zlaty from which a half goes to the landlord and a half to the church.
