= Podmanitzky family =

Hungarian noble family

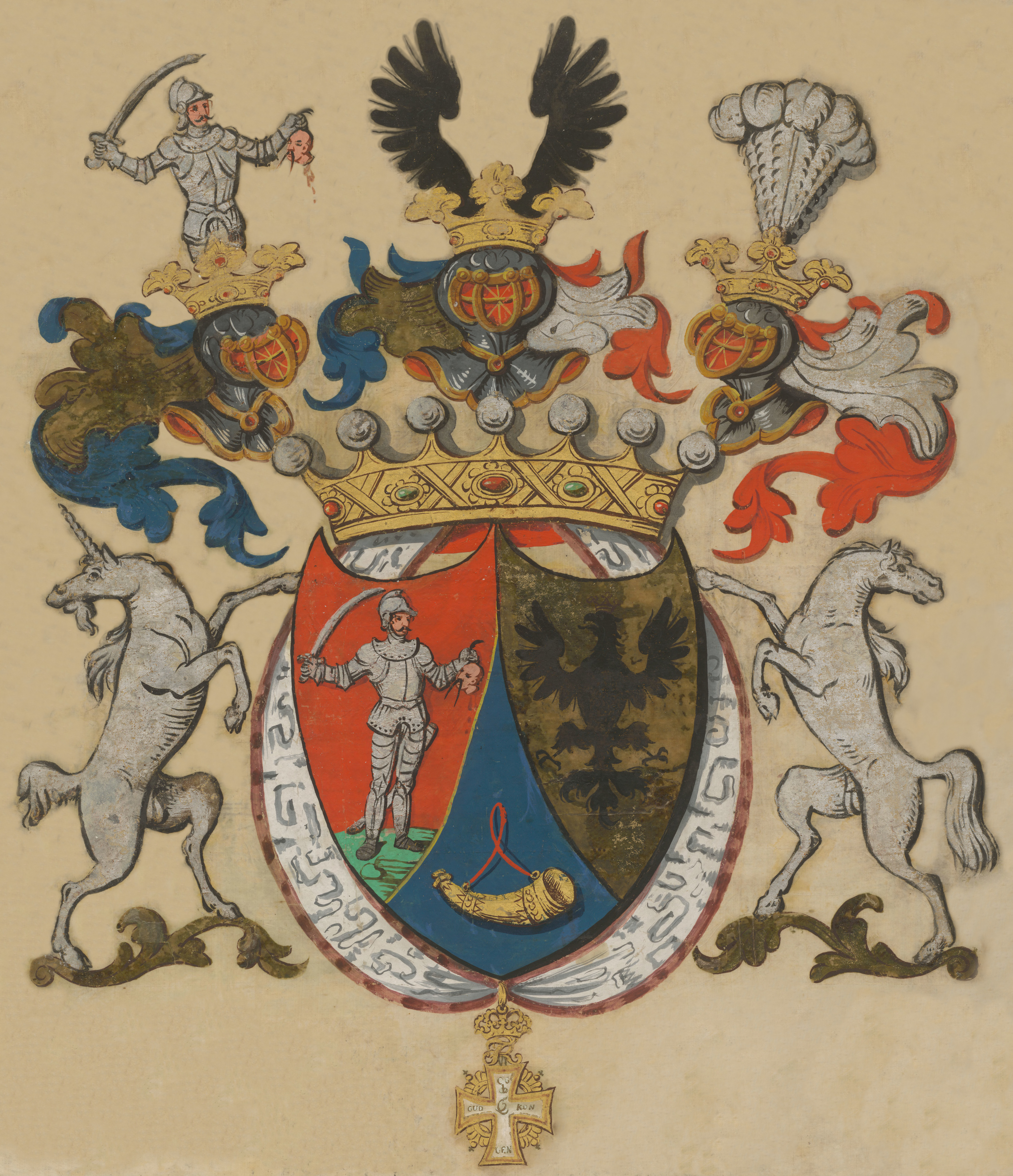
The coat of arms of the Podmanitzky family

The Podmanitzky family was an influential noble family from Upper Hungary, in the Kingdom of Hungary.

== History ==
They originate from the little village of Podmanin – also Podmanyn or Podmaninch – (today Podmanín as part of Považská Bystrica in Slovakia). They passed regional bylaw called Articuli Podmanickyani which is sound testimony to the life of small size Slovak medieval town of Považská Bystrica (Vágbeszterce) in the 16th century.

"They were the men, who for more than a hundred years influenced highest politics in the Kingdom of Hungary. They were present when most striking issues were dealt with, they helped several kings to gain the throne. Powerful, proud, but diplomatic. Great tactics, who had always known when to fight and when to retreat."

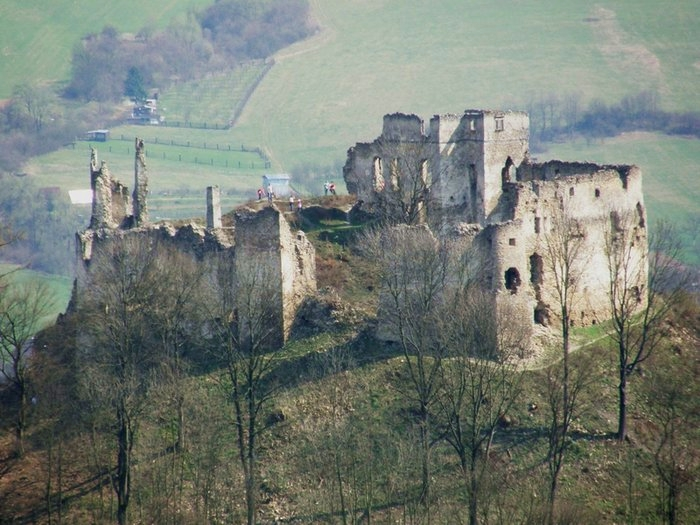
"Eagle's nest" of the family in Považský hrad

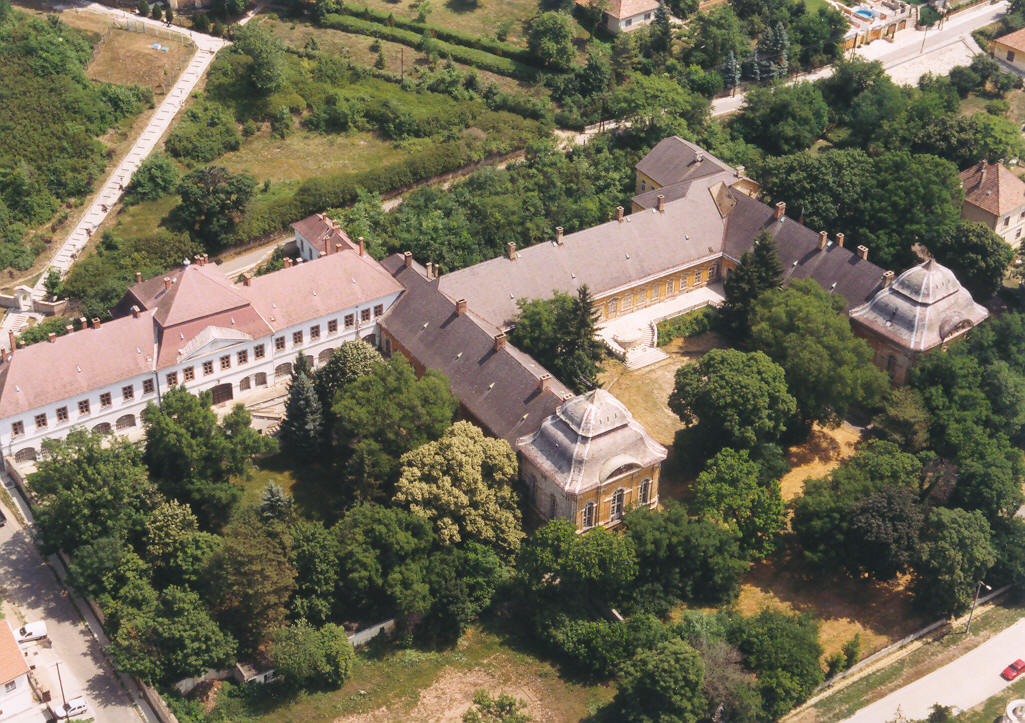
Podmanitzky palace in Aszód

== Members ==
=== First generation ===
==== Balázs Podmanitzky ====
Served as general in Hungarian army.

=== Second generation ===
==== István Podmanitzky ====
Podmaniczky, István (1480–1530) Bishop of Nyitra. He crowned first János Szapolyai and a few weeks later also Ferdinand I as the kings of the country.

==== Mihály Podmanitzky ====
Podmaniczky, Mihály (died 1526)

==== János Podmanitzky ====
Podmaniczky, János (???) Governor of Pozsony County, archbishop of Zagreb and gained the title of baron from Vladislas II, being the master of the Royal Chambers, between 1502 and 1506.

=== Third generation ===
==== János Podmanitzky ====
Podmaniczky, János (1500–1545) with his brother Raffael profited from the dispute of the head of the royal court. They were famous for they robberies and rebellion against the king. They split up in 1537 after they were presented a settlement in Aszód by János Szapolyai. He made Aszód the centre of his estates. Because of his modern methods of farming both his family and the town started developing rapidly. The tolerant landowner set up a castle for themselves and a church for the Evangelists. He founded a primary and secondary school. He had good cooperation with the local Roman Catholics and Jewish merchants. Aszód’s dynamical development is proved by the fact that the Monarch gave it the status of a market-town. This meant that Aszód could hold three annual fairs.

==== Raffael Podmanitzky ====
Podmaniczky, Raffael (1515–1558) was most famous owner of the castle Považský hrad (Hungarian: Vágbeszterce vára). Together with his brother they were limitless rulers of the northern part of the county. He is also responsible for rebuilding of the castle after it burned in 1543. At the end of the life he became governor of the Trencsén County. His tombstone is still palaced in the Church of the Visitation of the Virgin Mary in Považská Bystrica (Vágbeszterce). It has letters all around in old Slovak language. A silver club had been found inside the tomb from which later chalice was made.

== See also ==
- List of titled noble families in the Kingdom of Hungary
