= Viaduct Považská Bystrica =

Estakáda Považská Bystrica
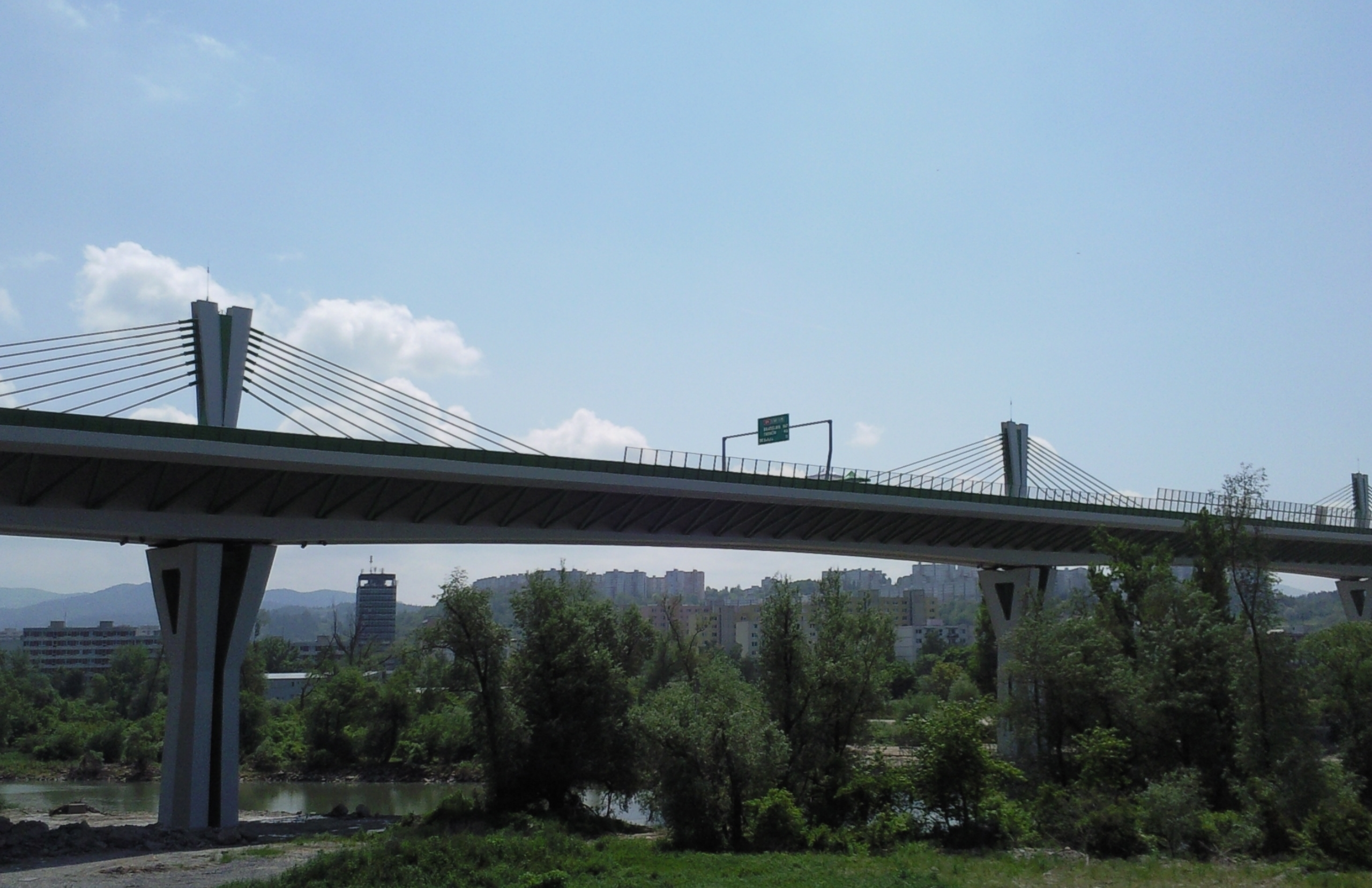
- Coordinates: 49°07′24″N 18°26′18″E
- Carries: 4 lanes of D1 motorway
- Crosses: Váh, Považská Bystrica
- Locale: Považská Bystrica, Slovakia

Characteristics
- Design: Alfa 04, a. s.
- Total length: 958.32 m (3,144.1 ft)
- Width: 30.4 m (100 ft)

History
- Designer: Miroslav Maťaščík
- Opened: May 31, 2010

Estakáda Považská Bystrica (working name: Most 206) is an extradosed bridge leading across the narrowest part of Považská Bystrica in Slovakia.
