= Plevník-Drienové =

- Municipality
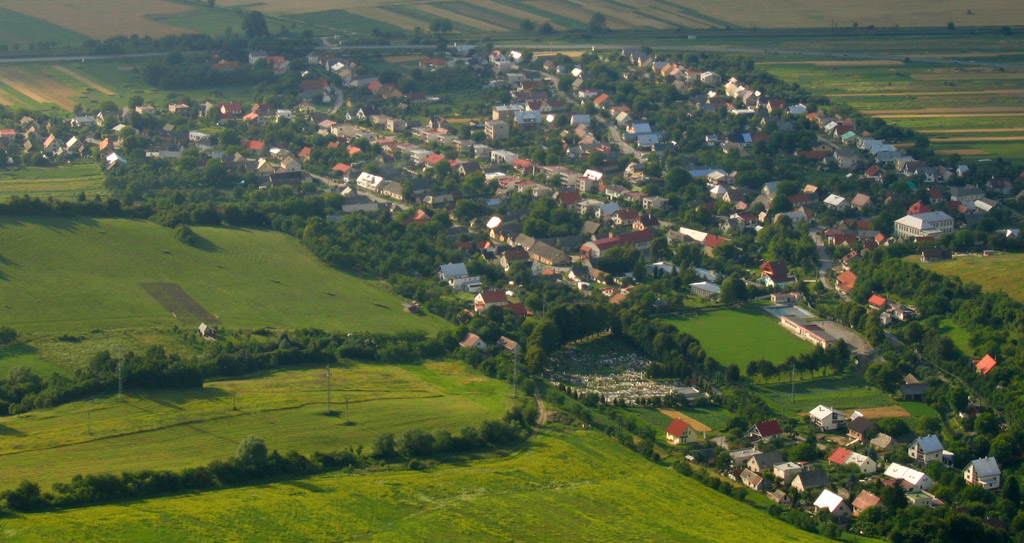

- Flag

- Location of Plevník-Drienové in the Trenčín Region Location of Plevník-Drienové in Slovakia
- Coordinates: 49.17°N 18.48°E
- Country: Slovakia
- Region: Trenčín Region
- District: Považská Bystrica District
- First mentioned: 1354

Area
  - Total: 13.00 km^{2} (5.02 sq mi)
- Elevation: 304 m (997 ft)

Population (2025)
  - Total: 1,716
- Time zone: UTC+1 (CET)
  - Summer (DST): UTC+2 (CEST)
- Postal code: 182 6
- Area code: +421 42
- Vehicle registration plate (until 2022): PB
- Website: www.plevnik-drienove.sk

Plevník-Drienové (Hungarian: Pelyvássomfalu) is a village and municipality in Považská Bystrica District in the Trenčín Region of north-western Slovakia.

== History ==
In historical records the village was first mentioned in 1354.

== Geography ==
The municipality lies at an altitude of 304 metres (997 ft) and covers an area of 13.00 km^{2} (5.02 sq mi) (2025).

== Population ==
Population statistic (10 years)
Year	1995	2005	2015	2025
Count	1555	1599	1593	1716
Difference		+2.82%	−0.37%	+7.72%

Population statistic
Year	2024	2025
Count	1718	1716
Difference		−0.11%

It has a population of 1716 people (31 December 2025).

=== Ethnicity ===
Census 2021 (1+ %)
Ethnicity	Number	Fraction
Slovak	1597	97.43%
Not found out	36	2.19%
Moravian	17	1.03%
Total	1639	

In year 2021 was 1639 people by ethnicity 1597 as Slovak, 36 as Not found out, 17 as Moravian, 15 as Other, 12 as Czech, 3 as Russian, 1 as Vietnamese, 1 as Italian, 1 as Polish, 1 as Hungarian, 1 as Iranian and 1 as English.

Note on population: The difference values of population numbers in the table "Population statistic" and in the sections "Ethnicity" & "Religion" is caused by the use of various statistical methods.

=== Religion ===
Census 2021 (1+ %)
Religion	Number	Fraction
Roman Catholic Church	1288	78.58%
None	260	15.86%
Not found out	34	2.07%
Evangelical Church	19	1.16%
Total	1639	

In year 2021 was 1639 people by religion 1288 from Roman Catholic Church, 260 from None, 34 from Not found out, 19 from Evangelical Church, 12 from Christian Congregations in Slovakia, 7 from Other, 6 from Greek Catholic Church, 5 from Ad hoc movements, 2 from Calvinist Church, 2 from Hinduism, 2 from Buddhism, 1 from Paganism and natural spirituality and 1 from Other and not ascertained christian church.

== Notable people ==
- Dominik Tatarka (1913-1989) – writer
