= Church of the Visitation of the Virgin Mary, Povazska Bystrica =

Kostol Navstivenia Panny Marie
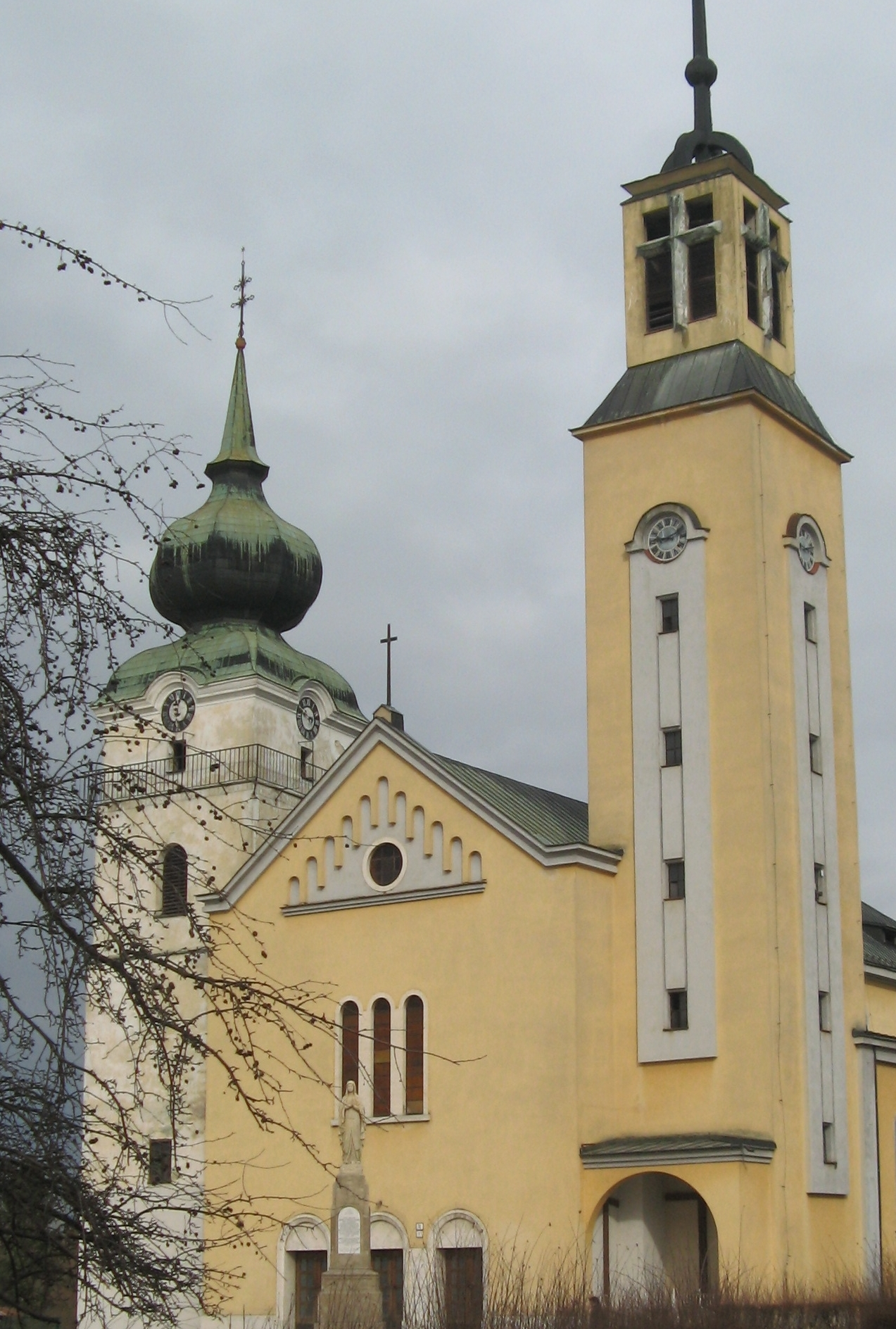
- Church of the Visitation of the Virgin Mary
- Kostol Navstivenia Panny Marie
- Location: Považská Bystrica, Trenčiansky
- Country: Slovakia

Architecture
- Years built: 14th century, rebuilt in 1940

Kostol Navstivenia Panny Marie lies in the town centre in Považská Bystrica. It was built in the 14th century by the Royal Hungarian János Podmanitzky owner of castle Považský hrad. It was rebuilt in 1940 to satisfy the need for capacity, leaving only presbytery, tower and northern part of the girding walls of the old church. Nowadays paned windows were designed by Slovak artists Vincent and Viera Hloznik. In the entrance hall of the church is placed the gravestone of Raffael Podmaitzky, Szigmund Balassa and his wife Alzbeta Zborowska.

== Gallery ==
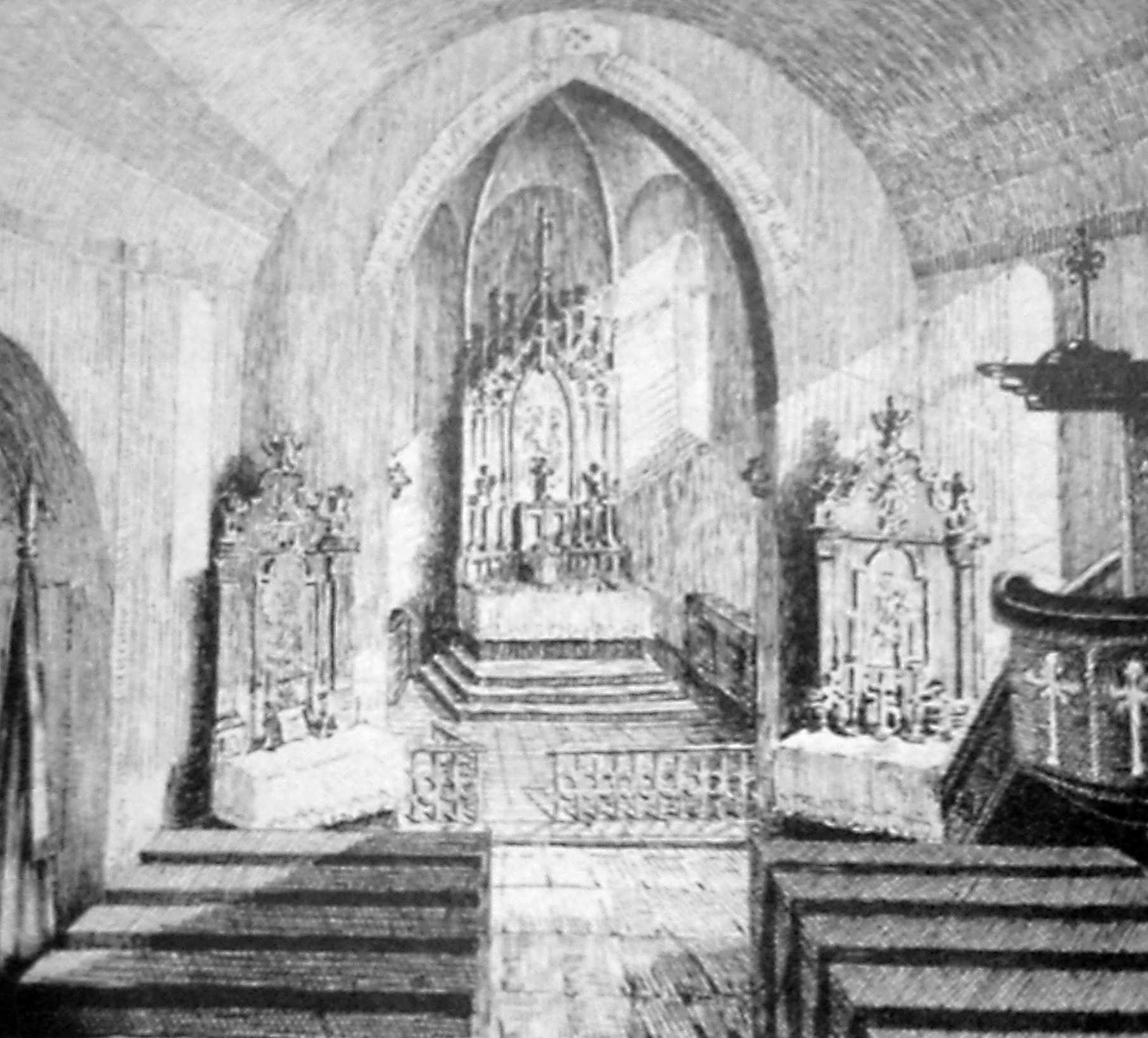
Interior of the old church.

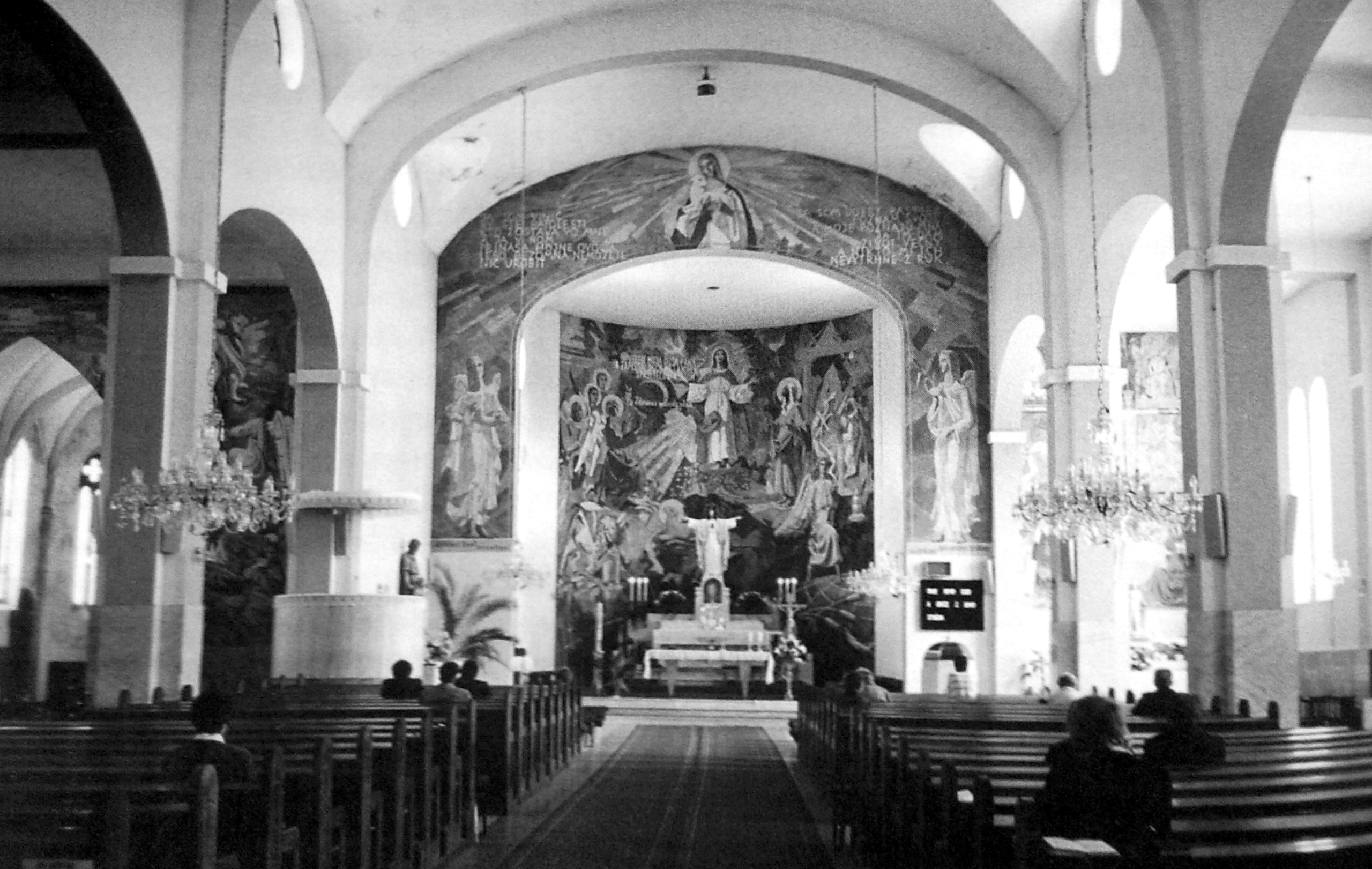
Interior of the church, on the left old presbytery with altar.

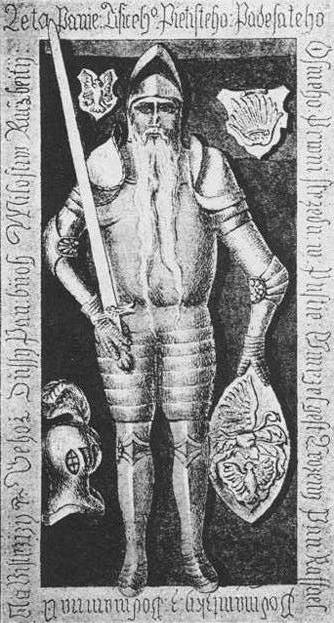
Grave of Raffael Podmanitzky placed in the entrance hall.

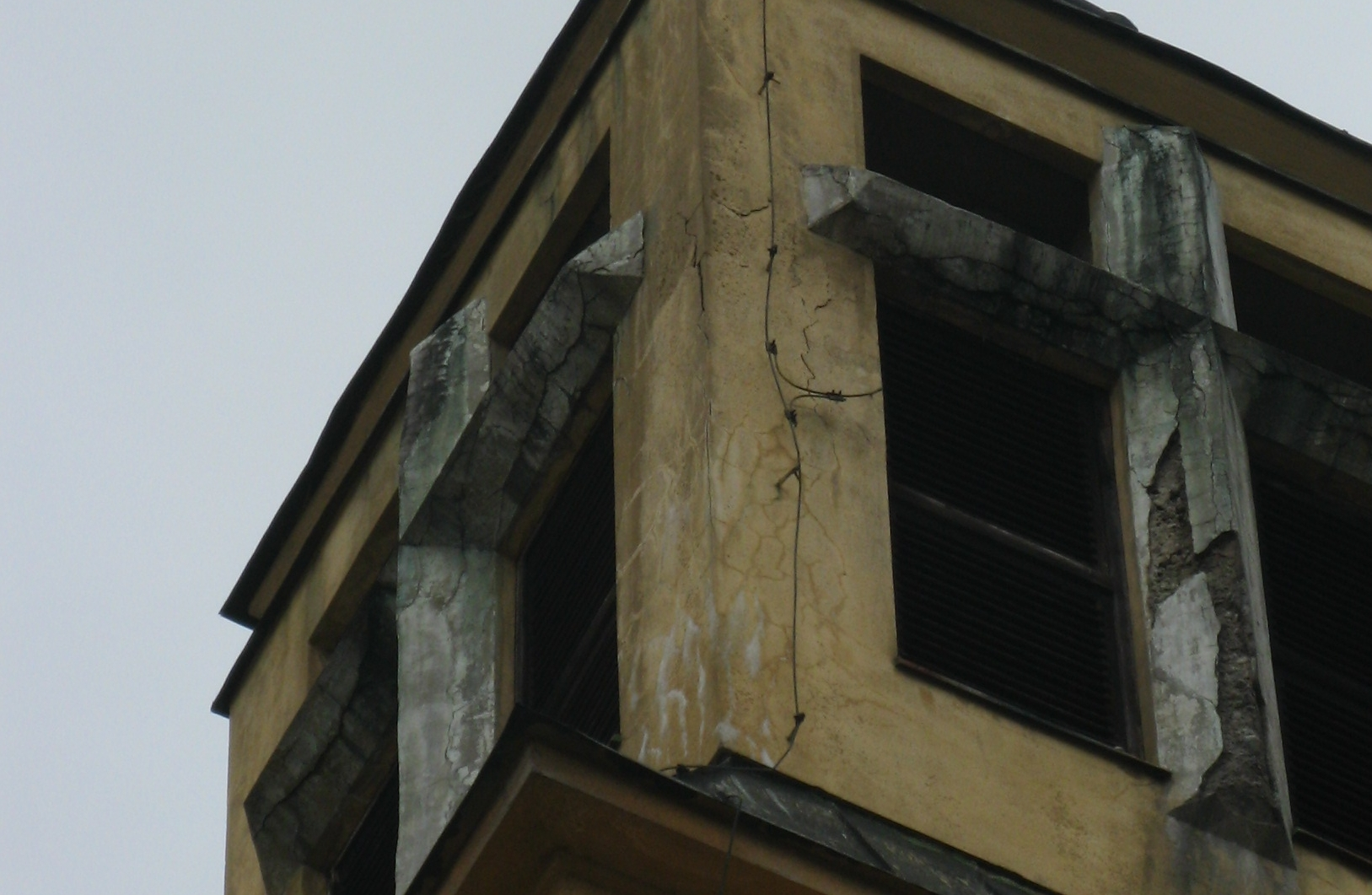
Detail of the tower.

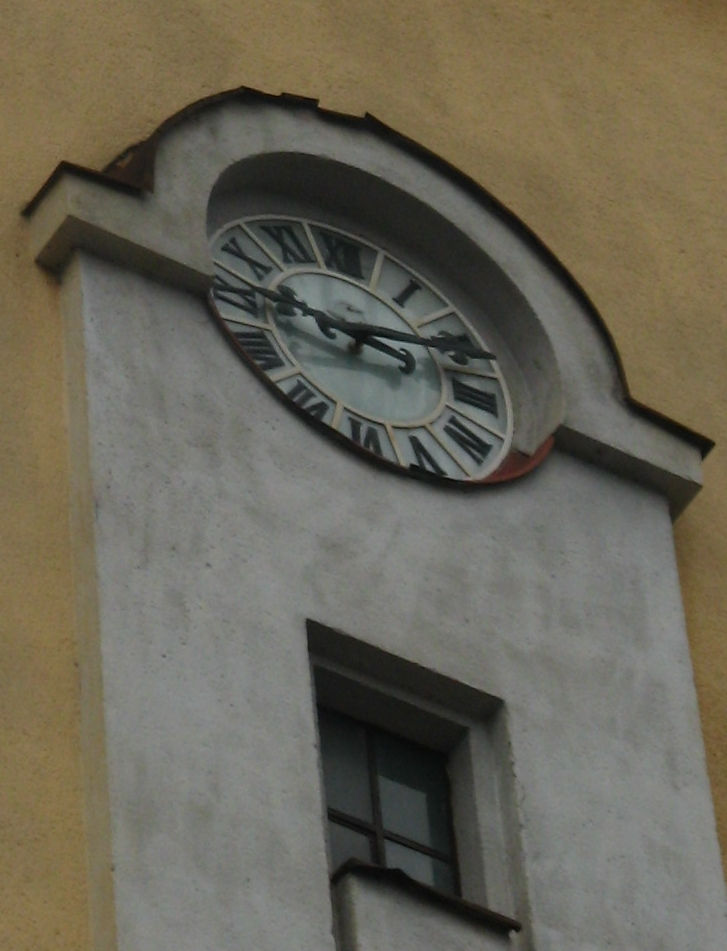
Clocks.

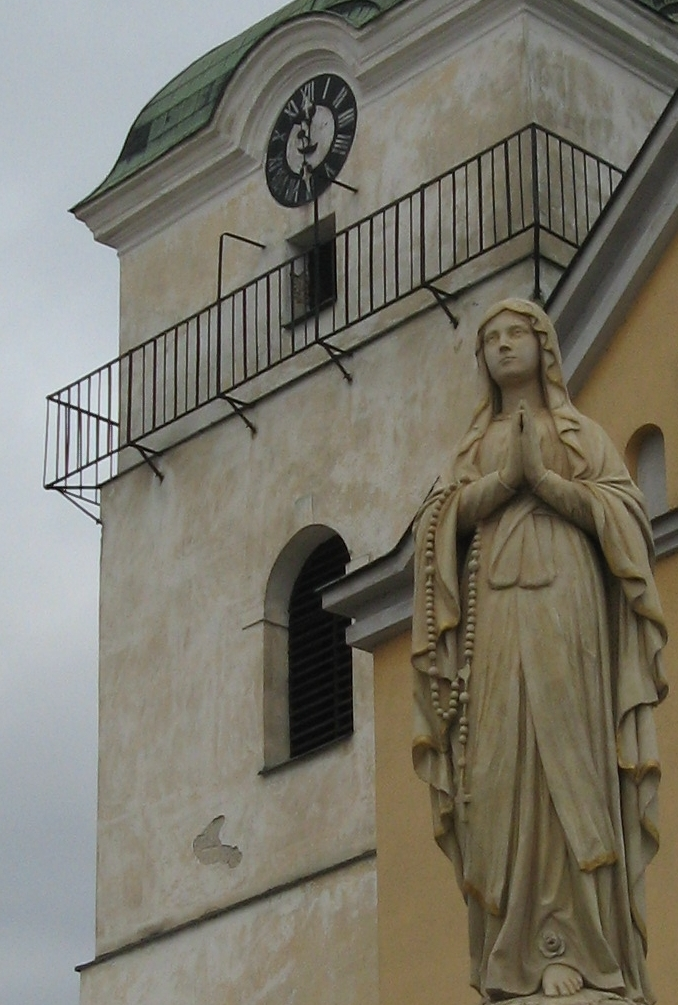
Statue in front of the church 1908 AD.
