= Dominik Tatarka =

Slovak writer (1913–1989)

- Born: 14 March 1913; Pelyvássomfalu, Austria-Hungary
- Died: 10 May 1989 (aged 76); Bratislava, Czechoslovakia
- Resting place: Martinský cintorín, Bratislava
- Education: Charles University; Sorbonne University
- Occupations: Writer, essayist
- Writing career
- Language: Slovak
- Notable awards: Jaroslav Seifert Prize; Order of Tomáš Garrigue Masaryk; Order of Ľudovít Štúr

Dominik Tatarka (14 March 1913 – 10 May 1989) was a Slovak writer famous for his 1956 satirical text The Demon of Consent (Démon súhlasu in Slovak) condemning Stalinism.

== Early life ==
Tatarka was born in Pelyvássomfalu, Kingdom of Hungary, Austria-Hungary (now Plevník-Drienové, Slovakia) to Jozef Tatarka-Greš and Žofia Tatarková (née Časnochová), who originally came from Sziklaszoros (now Skalité). He was the only boy and the second youngest out of eight children. After obtaining his primary education in his home village, Tatarka studied at grammar schools in Nitra and Trenčín, followed by universities studies of the Slovak and French language at the Charles University in Prague (1934–1938) and at Sorbonne (1938–1939).

== After the Communist takeover ==
After his return from studies abroad, he worked as a French language teacher at the grammar schools in Žilina and Martin. During the World War II, he joined the illegal Communist Party of Czechoslovakia and participated in the Slovak National Uprising.

In the early 1950s, Tatarka worked as an editor of various Slovak newspapers (Pravda, Národná Obroda) and a writer of propagandist books and movie scripts celebrating the role of the Communist party in the defeat of fascism and general modernization of the society, particularly in terms of collectivization of the agriculture.

== Prague Spring era ==
In spite of his initial support for the Communist takeover of Czechoslovakia, in the later phase of 1950s, Tatarka became increasingly disillusioned with the cult of personality and lack of debate within the regime. In 1954 he wrote The Demon of Consent, in which he satirically analyzed the role of "little stooges" seeking the "protection of the herd" and refusing to think for themselves, in maintaining totalitarian regimes.

In the 1960s, he became a prominent supporter of the Prague Spring liberalization agenda of the leadership of the new Communist party leadership. In 1963, The Demon of Consent was published in a book form and became widely known. Tatarka subsequently became a full-time professional writer. He also translated works of several French authors (Alfred de Musset, Guy de Maupassant) and wrote movie scripts.

== The Normalisation era and persecution ==
When the Warsaw Pact forces invaded Czechoslovakia in 1968 to restore the orthodox communist regime, Tatarka led a popular protest against the invasion at the SNP Square in Bratislava Following the invasion, Tatarka left the Communist party and faced heavy prosecution by the Soviet-supported leadership of the party, which aimed for the so-called normalization of the society and saw independent thinkers like Tatarka as obstacles in the process. By 1971, he was no longer allowed to work as a writer and his works were removed from public libraries. Tatarka had to make a living by working as a lumberjack and rubbish collector. He was under constant surveillance by the secret service.

In spite of the persecution, Tatarka established contacts with the anti-regime activists. He remained active as a writer of samizdat literature. In 1977 he was among a handful of Slovak signatories of Charter 77.

== Death and legacy ==
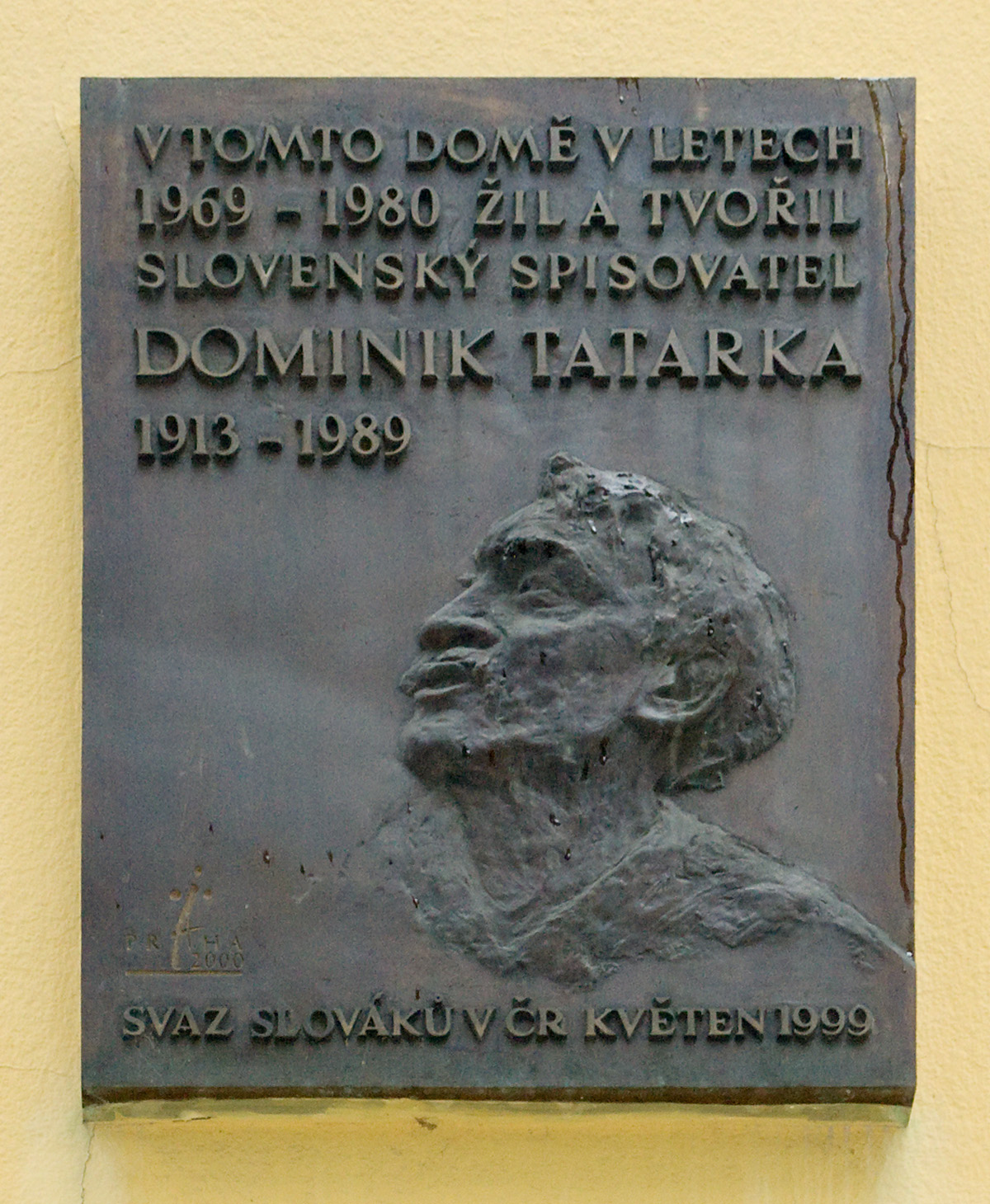
Dominik Tatarka memorial plaque in Prague

Tatarka died in Bratislava on 10 May 1989, shortly before the regime was toppled in the Velvet Revolution. He is buried at the Martinský cintorín in the Ružinov borough of Bratislava.

In 1986 he received the Jaroslav Seifert Prize. In 1990 he was awarded the Order of Tomáš Garrigue Masaryk 1st class and in 1996 Order of Ľudovít Štúr 1 st class, both in memoriam. A prestigious literary prize awarded annually in Slovakia since 1995 was named after Dominik Tatarka.

In 2013 the Slovak Post commemorate the centenary of Tatarka's birth. The anniversary of his birth was also included in the UNESCO list of celebrated anniversaries for 2012-2013.

The 286162 Tatarka minor planet discovered in 2001 is named after Dominik Tatarka.
