= Milochov =

Village in Slovakia

Coordinates: 49°8′2″N 18°23′6″E

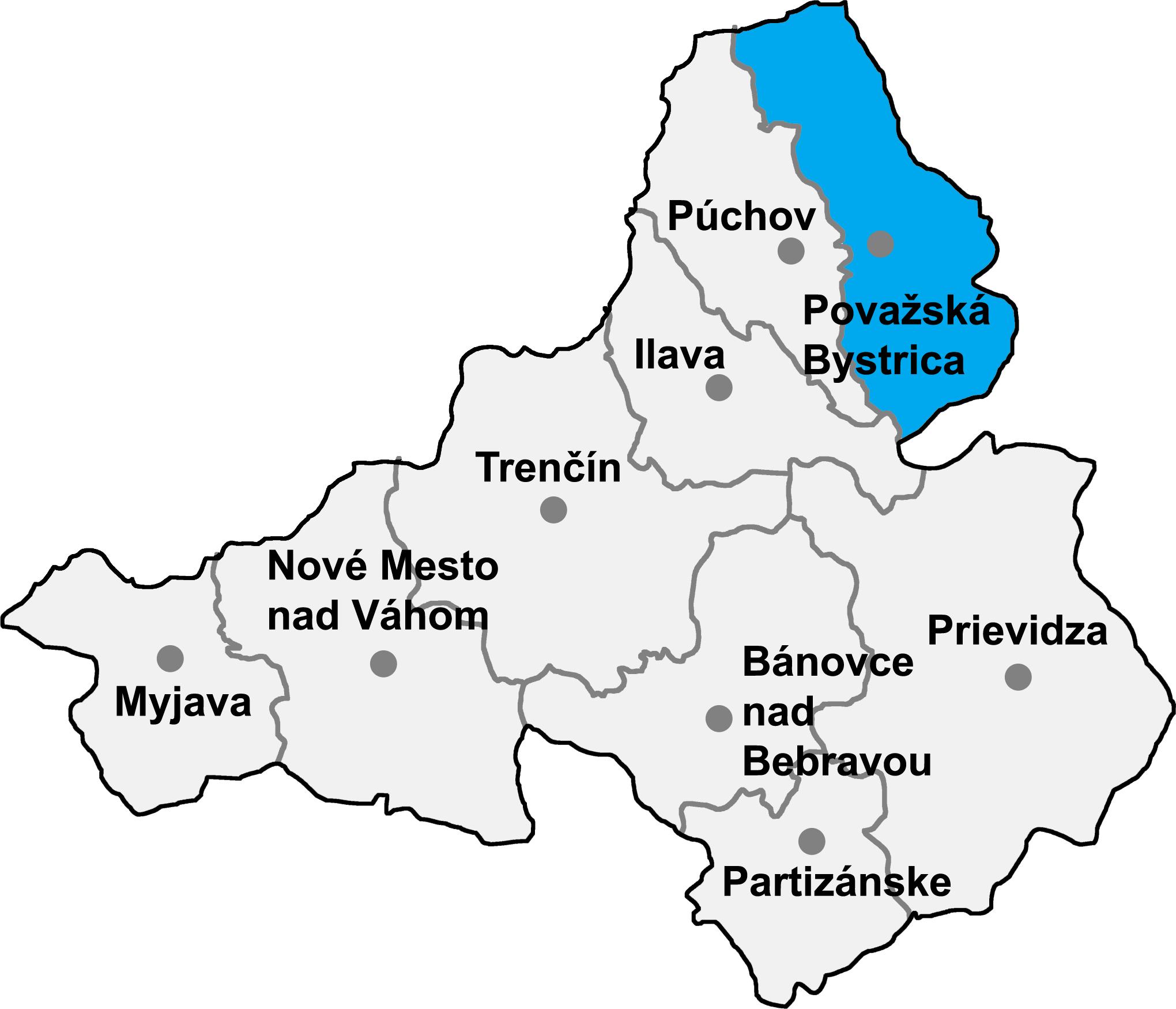
Považská Bystrica District in the Trenčín Region

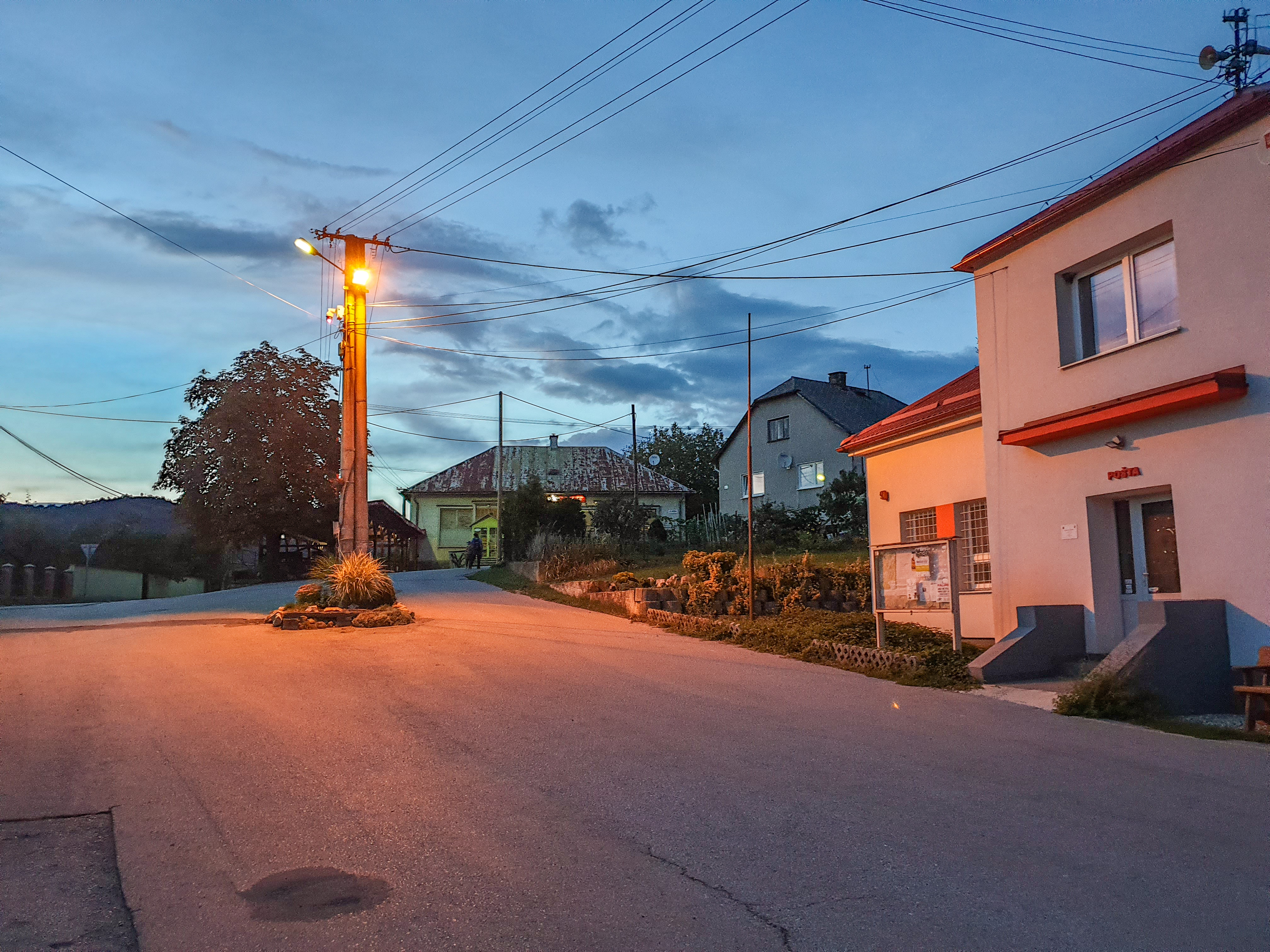
view of post office and local pub

Milochov is a village in the Považská Bystrica District, Trenčín Region of northwestern Slovakia.
