= Chapel of Saint Helena, Slovakia =

Chapel in Považská Bystrica, Slovakia

Coordinates: 49°06′27″N 18°26′34.5″E

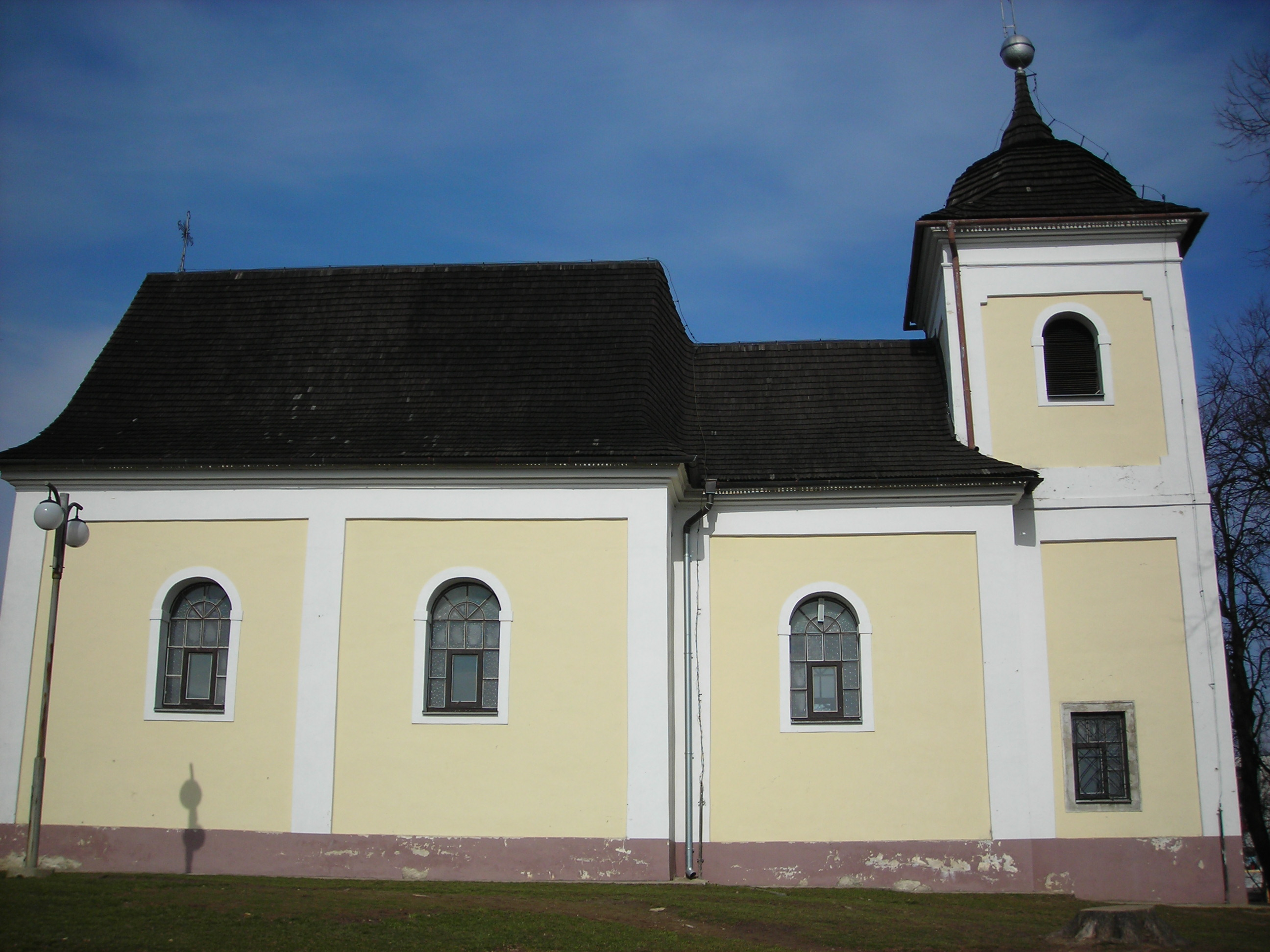
Chapel of Saint Helena in Považská Bystrica

The Chapel of Saint Helena in Považská Bystrica, Slovakia, was built in 1728 in the Baroque style by Count Peter Szapáry. After it was built, it was robbed and badly damaged more than once, which led to a massive restoration effort in the 1990s. Today the chapel is located on a housing estate and is currently holding regular church services.
