= Bistrica =

Bistrica, from Proto-Slavic *bystrъ 'quickly flowing, rushing' or 'clear water' may refer to:

== Places ==
=== Albania ===
- Bistricë, Albania, a village in the commune of Mesopotam

=== Bosnia and Herzegovina ===
- Bistrica, Banja Luka
- Bistrica, Gradiška
- Bistrica, Fojnica
- Bistrica, Gornji Vakuf
- Bistrica, Jajce
- Bistrica, Zenica
- Bistrica, Žepče

=== Croatia ===
- Bistrica, Croatia, a village in eastern Croatia
- Marija Bistrica, a town and Marian shrine
- Zlatar-Bistrica, a town in western Croatia

=== Kosovo ===
- Bistrica, Kosovo, a village in the municipality of Leposavić

=== Montenegro ===
- Bistrica, Montenegro, a village in the municipality of Mojkovac

=== North Macedonia ===
- Bistrica, Bitola, a village in the municipality of Bitola
- Bistrica, Čaška, a village in the municipality of Čaška

=== Serbia ===
- Bistrica (Crna Trava), a village in the municipality of Crna Trava
- Bistrica (Lazarevac), a village in the municipality of Lazarevac
- Bistrica (Leskovac), a village in the municipality of Leskovac
- Bistrica (Nova Varoš), a village in the municipality of Nova Varoš
- Bistrica (Novi Sad), a quarter of the city of Novi Sad
- Bistrica (Petrovac), a village in the municipality of Petrovac na Mlavi

=== Slovenia ===
- Bistrica, Črnomelj, a settlement in the municipality of Črnomelj
- Bistrica, Litija, a settlement in the municipality of Litija
- Bistrica, Naklo, a settlement in the municipality of Naklo
- Bistrica ob Sotli, a settlement in the municipality of Bistrica ob Sotli
- Bistrica pri Tržiču, a settlement in the municipality of Tržič
- Bistrica, Šentrupert, a settlement in the municipality of Šentrupert
- Bohinjska Bistrica, a settlement in the municipality of Bohinj
- Ilirska Bistrica, a town in the municipality of Ilirska Bistrica
- Kamniška Bistrica, a settlement, a valley, and a river
- Slovenska Bistrica, a town the municipality of Slovenska Bistrica

== Rivers ==
=== Albania ===
- Bistrica (Ionian Sea), a river between Delvinë and Sarandë in southwestern Albania

=== Bosnia and Herzegovina ===
- Bistrica (Vrbas), a river in Federation of Bosnia and Herzegovina, tributary of Vrbas
- Bistrica (Drina), a river near Foča in Eastern Bosnia, tributary of Drina
- Bistrica (Livanjsko Polje), a river near Livno in Western Bosnia

=== Croatia ===
- Bistrica (Dobra), a tributary of the Dobra

=== Greece ===
- Haliacmon (Bistrica), longest river in Greece

=== Kosovo ===
- Bistrica (Ibar), tributary of Ibar
- Dečani Bistrica, a river in western Kosovo, tributary of the White Drin
- Peć Bistrica, a river in southwestern Kosovo, tributary of the White Drin
- Prizren Bistrica, a river in northern Kosovo, tributary of the White Drin
- Kožnjar Bistrica, see Dečani Bistrica
- Loćane Bistrica, tributary of Erenik, see Dečani Bistrica

=== Montenegro ===
- Bistrica (Lim), 2 tributaries of the Zeta and Lim river in Montenegro

=== Serbia ===
- Bistrica (Nišava), a river in southeastern Serbia, tributary of the Nišava
- Bistrica (Vlasina), a river in southeastern Serbia, tributary of the Vlasina
- Bistrica (South Morava), a river in southeastern Serbia, tributary of the South Morava

=== Slovenia ===
- Kamnik Bistrica, an Alpine river in northern Slovenia, tributary of the Sava
- Triglav Bistrica, an Alpine river in Upper Carniola, tributary of the Sava Dolinka
- Tržič Bistrica, a river in Upper Carniola, tributary of the Sava

== See also ==
- Bistrice (disambiguation)
- Bistricë (disambiguation)
- Bistrica (disambiguation), in Slovene, Croat, Serb and Macedonian
- Bistritsa (disambiguation) (Бистрица), in Bulgarian
- Bistritz (disambiguation), in German
- Bistriţa (disambiguation), in Romanian
- Bystrica (disambiguation), in Slovak
- Bystrzyca (disambiguation), in Polish
- Feistritz (disambiguation), Austrianised form
- Bystřice (disambiguation), in Czech
- Beszterce (disambiguation), in Hungarian
- Bystrytsia (disambiguation), in Ukrainian
