= Bystřice =

Bystřice may refer to places in the Czech Republic:

== Inhabited places ==
- Bystřice (Benešov District), a town in the Central Bohemian Region
- Bystřice (Frýdek-Místek District), a municipality and village in the Moravian-Silesian Region
- Bystřice (Jičín District), a municipality and village in the Hradec Králové Region
- Bystřice, a village and part of Bělá nad Radbuzou in the Plzeň Region
- Bystřice, a village and part of Dubí in the Ústí nad Labem Region
- Bystřice, a village and part of Hroznětín in the Karlovy Vary Region
- Bystřice, a village and part of Včelákov in the Pardubice Region
- Bystřice nad Pernštejnem, a town in the Vysočina Region
- Bystřice nad Úhlavou, a village and part of Nýrsko in the Plzeň Region
- Bystřice pod Hostýnem, a town in the Zlín Region
- Bystřice pod Lopeníkem, a municipality and village in the Zlín Region
- Malá Bystřice, a municipality and village in the Zlín Region
- Nová Bystřice, a town in the South Bohemian Region
- Valašská Bystřice, a municipality and village in the Zlín Region
- Velká Bystřice, a town in the Olomouc Region

== Rivers ==
- Bystřice (Cidlina)
- Bystřice (Morava)

== See also ==
- Bystrica (disambiguation)
- Bystrzyca (disambiguation)
- Bistrica (disambiguation)
- Bistritz (disambiguation)
