= Bistra =

Bistra may refer to:

== People ==
- Bistra Gospodinova (born 1966), Bulgarian swimmer
- Bistra Vinarova (1890–1977), Bulgarian artist

== Populated places ==
- Bistra, Silistra Province, a village in Silistra Province, Bulgaria
- Bistra, Targovishte Province, a village in Targovishte Province, Bulgaria
- Bistra, Croatia, a municipality in Zagreb County, Croatia
- Donja Bistra, a village in Zagreb County, Croatia
- Gornja Bistra, a village in Zagreb County, Croatia
- Bistra (mountain) in North Macedonia
- Bistra (peak) in Kosovo
- Bistra, Alba, a commune in Alba County, Romania
- Bistra, Maramureș, a commune in Maramureș County, Romania
- Bistra, a village in the commune Popești, Bihor County, Romania
- Bistra, Črna na Koroškem, a village in Slovenia
- Bistra, Vrhnika, village and monastery in Slovenia

== Rivers ==
=== in Croatia ===
- Bistra Koprivnička, a tributary to the Drava

=== in Romania ===
- Bistra (Arieș), a tributary of the Arieș in Alba County
- Bistra (Barcău), a tributary of the Barcău in Bihor County
- Bistra (Bicaz), a tributary of the Capra in Neamț County
- Bistra (Mureș), a tributary of the Mureș in Mureș County
- Bistra (Sebeș), a tributary of the Sebeș in Sibiu County
- Bistra (Timiș), a tributary of the Timiș in Caraș-Severin County
- Bistra (Vișeu), a tributary of the Vișeu in Maramureș County
- Bistra Mică, a tributary of the Bistra in Neamț County
- Bistra Mărului, a tributary of the Bistra in Caraș-Severin County

== See also ==
- Bistrița (disambiguation)
- Bistro (disambiguation)
