= Beastro =

Beastro may refer to:

- Beastro (video game), a 2026 farm and restaurant sim video game
- Beastro (restaurant), a defunct Korean restaurant in Portland, Oregon

== See also ==
- Bistro (disambiguation)
