= Bystrzyca =

Bystrzyca may refer to:

== Rivers ==
- Bystrzyca (Odra), a tributary of the Oder
- Bystrzyca (Tyśmienica), a tributary of the Tyśmienica
- Bystrzyca Dusznicka, a tributary of the Nysa Kłodzka
- Bystrzyca Łomnicka, a tributary of the Nysa Kłodzka
- Bystrytsia River, a river in modern Ukraine

== Towns and villages ==
- Bystrzyca Kłodzka, a town in Lower Silesian Voivodeship (south-west Poland)
- Bystrzyca, Lwówek County in Lower Silesian Voivodeship (south-west Poland)
- Bystrzyca, Oława County in Lower Silesian Voivodeship (south-west Poland)
- Bystrzyca, Kuyavian-Pomeranian Voivodeship (north-central Poland)
- Bystrzyca, Kraśnik County in Lublin Voivodeship (east Poland)
- Bystrzyca, Lublin County in Lublin Voivodeship (east Poland)
- Bystrzyca, Łuków County in Lublin Voivodeship (east Poland)
- Bystrzyca, Subcarpathian Voivodeship (south-east Poland)
- Bystrzyca, Gniezno County in Greater Poland Voivodeship (west-central Poland)
- Bystrzyca, Konin County in Greater Poland Voivodeship (west-central Poland)
- Bystrzyca Dolna
- Bystrzyca Górna
- Bystrzyca Nowa
- Bystrzyca Stara
- Bystrzyca (Polish name for Bystřice), a village in Moravian-Silesian Region

== See also ==
- Bystřice (disambiguation) for the Czech variant
- Bistrica (disambiguation) for the Serbian, Croatian, Bosnian and Slovenian variant
- Bistritsa (disambiguation) for the Bulgarian variant
- Bistritz (disambiguation) for the German variant
- Bistrița (disambiguation) for the Romanian variant
- Bystrica (disambiguation) for the Slovak variant
- Feistritz (disambiguation) (Germanised word)
