= Bistricioara =

Bistricioara may refer to the following places in Romania:

- Bistricioara, a village in the commune Ceahlău, Neamț County
- Bistricioara (Vâlcea), a tributary of the Bistrița (Olt basin) in Vâlcea County
- Bistricioara (Tismana), a tributary of the Bistrița (Jiu basin) in Gorj County
- Bistricioara (Siret), a tributary of the Bistrița (Siret basin) in Harghita and Neamț Counties

== See also ==
- Bistra (disambiguation)
- Bistrița (disambiguation)
