= Bistricë =

Bistricë may refer to:

- Bistricë, Albania, a village in Albania, in the commune of Mesopotam
- Bistricë, Kosovo, a village in Kosovo, in the municipality of Leposavić

or:

- Bistricë (river), a river in Albania

== See also ==
- Bistrice (disambiguation)
- Bistrica (disambiguation)
