= Bistritz =

Bistritz may refer to:

== Municipalities ==
- Bistrița, the capital city of Bistriţa-Năsăud County, Transylvania, Romania
- Bystřice nad Pernštejnem (Bistritz ob Pernstein), a town in the Czech Republic
- Bystřice pod Hostýnem (Bistritz am Hostein), a town in the Czech Republic
- Bystřice (Benešov District) (Bistritz), a town in the Czech Republic
- Bystřice (Frýdek-Místek District) (Bistritz), a municipality and village in the Czech Republic
- Bystřice pod Lopeníkem (Bistritz unterm Lopenik), a municipality and village in the Czech Republic

== Rivers ==
- Bystřice River, a small Czech river (Bistritz)
- Bistriţa River (Siret), river in the Romanian region of Moldavia
- Bistrița River (Someș), river in the Romanian region of Transylvania

== See also ==
- Bystřice (disambiguation) (Czech)
- Bystrzyca (disambiguation) (Polish)
- Bystrica (disambiguation) (Slovak)
- Bistrica (disambiguation) (Slovene)
- Bistritsa (disambiguation) (Бистрица, Bulgarian)
- Bistrița (disambiguation) (Romanian)
- Beszterce (disambiguation) (Hungarian)
- Feistritz (disambiguation) (Austrianised form)
