= Tadeusz Kowalik =

Polish economist and activist (1926–2012)

- Born: 19 November 1926; Kajetanówka
- Died: 30 July 2012 (aged 85); Warsaw
- Citizenship: Polish
- Occupations: economist, activist

Tadeusz Kowalik (19 November 1926 – 30 July 2012) was a Polish economist, public intellectual and political and social activist. As a prolific publicist in the area of political economy, he is notable for his dissenting leftist views expressed during the Polish systemic transformation (in 1989 and later).

== Biography ==
Tadeusz Kowalik was born in Kajetanówka near Lublin in what at that time was central-eastern Poland. As a youngster he became radicalized by the economic backwardness of his region under the prewar Sanation regime and then by the Nazi German occupation. In 1946 he joined the youth wing of the communist Polish Workers' Party and in 1951 graduated from the University of Warsaw.

At the height of his career Kowalik was Poland's leading political economist, professor of economics and humanities, specialist in comparative analysis of economic systems and historian of economic thought. He worked from 1960 at subunits of the Polish Academy of Sciences, from 1993 at the Institute of Economics of the Polish Academy of Sciences, taught at Warsaw's higher education institutions (the social science school of the communist party and later at schools of economy and business), and at foreign universities and scholarly institutions, namely Cambridge, Woodrow Wilson International Center for Scholars in Washington, D.C., Oxford, York University in Toronto and New York's New School for Social Research. Kowalik completed all these foreign assignments before being granted a full professorship in Poland (1989).

For nearly half a century Kowalik remained at the forefront of the economic debate in Poland. He was particularly influenced by the Polish economists Rosa Luxemburg, Michał Kalecki and Oskar R. Lange, of whom the latter two were his mentors, older colleagues and co-workers (Kowalik co-authored works with Kalecki). He also worked with other pro-dissident academics, including the philosopher Leszek Kołakowski and the economist Włodzimierz Brus. Despite the restrictions the communist authorities imposed on him, Kowalik was the most published economist of his generation in Poland (because of the official prohibitions, many of his works appeared under the names of the senior economist Edward Lipiński and other Kowalik associates). From 1970, Kowalik supervised Jerzy Osiatyński's editing of Kalecki's collected works.

From 1948 Kowalik was a member of the Polish United Workers' Party, from which he was expelled, or which he quit, during the 1968 purge. In 1956–62 Kowalik was involved in the revisionist-dissident Crooked Circle Club. In 1956–57 he was chief editor of Życie Gospodarcze ('The Economic Life') weekly, fired for the allegedly revisionist views he espoused (he wanted to reform the overly centralized state socialist system).

An active participant of the democratic opposition's leftist current from the 1960s, in the 1970s he was among the signatories of several appeals presented to the communist authorities in defense of repressed activists and he worked with the pioneering Workers' Defence Committee (KOR) human rights group. Kowalik was a founding member of the Society for Scientific Courses (Towarzystwo Kursów Naukowych) from 1978, but was officially banned from teaching or publishing. In August 1980 in Gdańsk, he was a member of the advisory "Expert Commission" of the Inter-Enterprise Strike Committee. In 1981 the Solidarity labor union was suppressed. In the 1980s, Kowalik published extensively in the underground press, expressing his support for the principles of democratic syndicalism, and participated in Solidarity structures. In his writings Kowalik used the ideas developed in the 1920s and 1930s by Oskar Lange and other Polish Marxists, who were critical of the socialist (at that time Soviet) industrial organization. In 1989–92 Kowalik was a co-organizer of the Labour Solidarity (Solidarność Pracy) faction, and in 1992 he co-founded the Labour United (Unia Pracy) party. Kowalik was and remained a supporter of the social-democratic economic model and he opposed the prevalent in the 1980s and 1990s neoliberal views that promoted an unbridled free market.

During 1994–2005, Kowalik was a member of the Council for Socio-Economic Strategy at the Council of Ministers (RSSG, Rada Strategii Społeczno-Gospodarczej przy Radzie Ministrów).

He authored or co-authored numerous books, including Rosa Luxemburg: Theory of Accumulation and Imperialism (1971, 2014 English translation) and From Solidarity to Sellout: The Restoration of Capitalism in Poland (2011).

== Revision of Keynesian political economy ==
Tadeusz Kowalik, like Kazimierz Łaski, was an important student of Michał Kalecki, whose ideas Kowalik developed in his mature years in practical terms, as an activist and publicist of the Polish political transformation (around 1990 and later). Kowalik was disappointed by the neglect of the economic legacy of Rosa Luxemburg, Michał Kalecki and Oskar Lange, which he considered applicable to Poland's new reality. From Lange Kowalik inherited an open-minded and non-dogmatic approach to analyzing the reasoning of economists from different schools of thought.

Based on his understanding of Luxemburg's works, Kowalik challenged the established views of the Keynesian Revolution. The Luxemburg's insight gave Kowalik ideas for a new interpretation of Kalecki's 1933 theory, which caused Kalecki to reconsider aspects of his own work. After 1968, Kowalik and Kalecki in a joint paper entitled "Observations on the Crucial Reform" revisited the issues of the Keynesian Revolution from the point of view of the Marxist discussions that preceded it.

== Critique of Polish transformation ==
From the 1950s, Kowalik was critical of the ways in which state socialist economy was implemented in Poland and worked on its reform, until he was removed from the position of chief editor of the official economic periodical. From the late 1980s, he was among the most persistent critics of the Polish systemic transformation, the economic aspects of which were based largely on the so-called Balcerowicz Plan, and of the Polish variant of capitalism that subsequently developed. It was imposed, according to Kowalik, in conformity with the "Anglo-Saxon neoliberal systemic concept". Kowalik, who favored the Nordic model of economic distribution, argued that the newly dominant Polish reformers chose and pursued the least favorable, in terms of societal interests, of the three economic scenarios possible. Kowalik wrote in 1996: "In Europe of the second half of the 20th century, one of the most unjust socioeconomic systems came into being in Poland". He argued that Prime Minister Tadeusz Mazowiecki (Poland's first non-communist chief of government) and his circle could have chosen a different course and he spoke of "Mazowiecki's ideological failure". Social inequities, Kowalik claimed, destabilize the foundations of political institutions in liberal democracy. From the early 1990s, Kowalik promoted many of the ideas later popularized by Thomas Piketty. However, despite Kowalik's preeminence among Polish economists, in Polish politics his voice was consistently drowned and his views marginalized.

== Books ==
- Róża Luksemburg. Teoria akumulacji i imperializmu ('Rosa Luxemburg: theory of accumulation and imperialism'). Zakład Narodowy im. Ossolińskich, Wrocław 1971. Also Książka i Prasa, Warszawa 2012, ISBN 978-83-62744-41-1.
- Rosa Luxemburg: Theory of Accumulation and Imperialism. Palgrave Macmillan, London 2014, ISBN 1137428333.
- From Solidarity to Sellout: The Restoration of Capitalism in Poland. Monthly Review Press, New York 2011, ISBN 978-1-58367-296-9.
- O lepszy ład społeczno-ekonomiczny ('For a better socioeconomic order'). Polskie Towarzystwo Ekonomiczne, Warszawa 2013, ISBN 978-83-88700-73-6.
