= Feistritz =

Feistritz may refer to:

== Austria ==
- Deutschfeistritz, in Styria
- Feistritz bei Anger, in Styria
- Feistritz bei Knittelfeld, in Styria
- Feistritz am Wechsel, in Lower Austria
- Feistritz an der Gail, in Carinthia
- Feistritz im Rosental, in Carinthia
- Feistritz ob Bleiburg, in Carinthia
- Maria Buch-Feistritz, in Styria
- Feistritz an der Drau, part of Paternion, in Carinthia
- Feistritz Saddle, a high mountain pass in the Austrian Alps
- Feistritz (Lafnitz), a river in Styria, tributary of the Lafnitz
  - Schloss Feistritz (Ilz), a castle named after the river
- Feistritz (Pitten), a river in Lower Austria, headwater of the Pitten

== Slovenia ==
- Windisch Feistritz, the German name for Slovenska Bistrica, in Slovenia
- Illyrisch Feistritz, the German name for Ilirska Bistrica, in Slovenia
- Bistrica, Šentrupert, in the Mirna Valley in southeastern Slovenia
- Burg Feistritz, a castle in northeastern Slovenia

== See also ==
- Battle of Feistritz, 1813
- Bistrica (disambiguation)
- Bistrița (disambiguation)
- Bistritsa (disambiguation)
- Bistritz (disambiguation)
- Bystrica (disambiguation)
- Bystrzyca (disambiguation)
- Gersdorf an der Feistritz, Styria, Austria
