= Pszczela Wola =

- Village
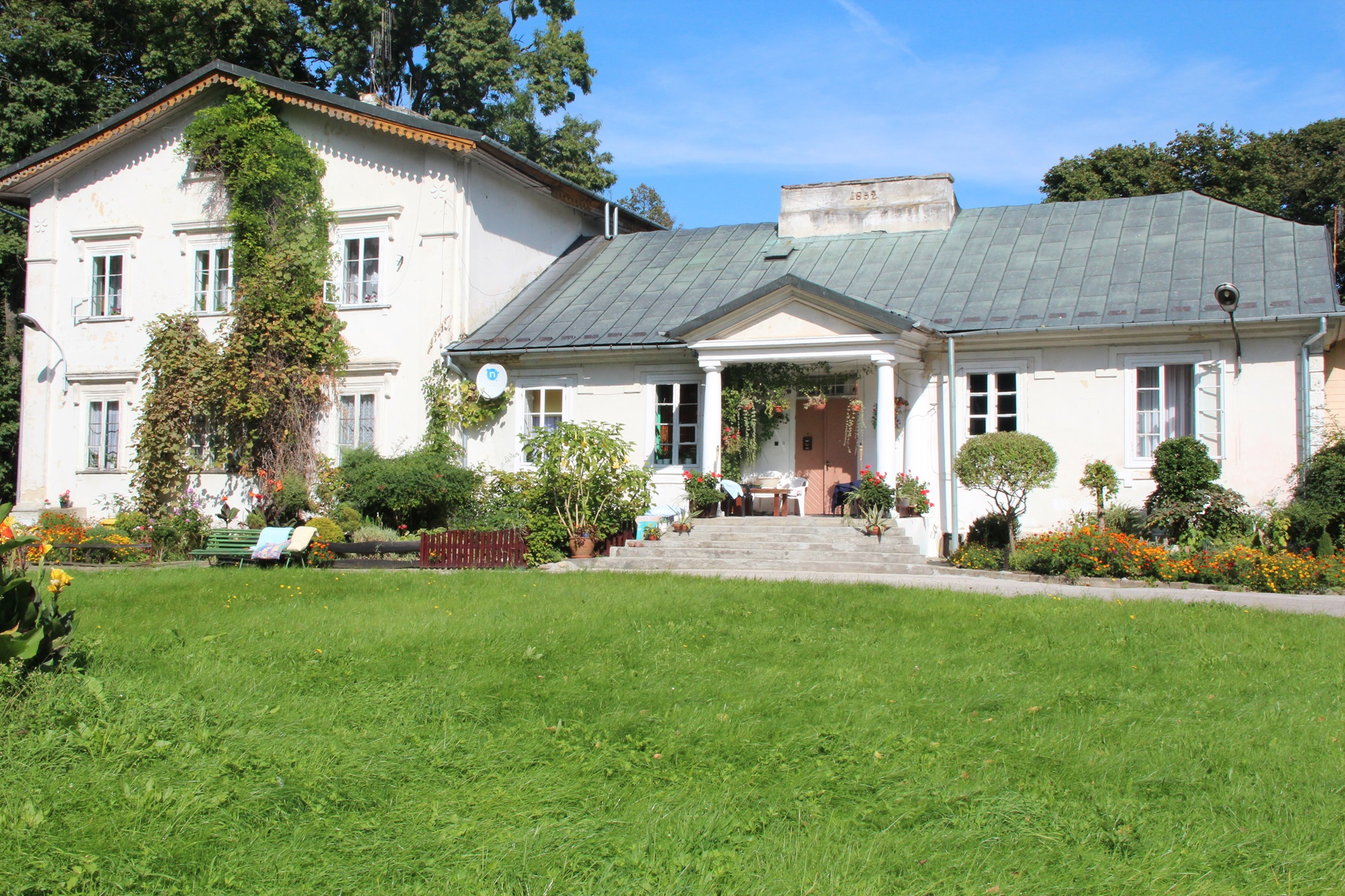
- Old manor house in Pszczela Wola

- Location within Poland
- Coordinates: 51°6′N 22°30′E
- Country: Poland
- Voivodeship: Lublin
- County: Lublin
- Gmina: Strzyżewice

Population
  - Total: 195
- Time zone: UTC+1 (CET)
  - Summer (DST): UTC+2 (CEST)
- Vehicle registration: LUB

Pszczela Wola [ˈpʂt͡ʂɛla ˈvɔla] is a village in the administrative district of Gmina Strzyżewice, within Lublin County, Lublin Voivodeship, in eastern Poland.
