= Pawłówek, Lublin Voivodeship =

Pawłówek
- Village
- Location within Poland
- Coordinates: 51°03′40″N 22°27′59″E
- Country: Poland
- Voivodeship: Lublin
- County: Lublin
- Gmina: Strzyżewice

Pawłówek [paˈvwuvɛk] is a village in the administrative district of Gmina Strzyżewice, within Lublin County, Lublin Voivodeship, in eastern Poland.
