= Bistritsa =

Bistritsa or Bistrica (Бистрица, from Bulgarian бистър and ultimately Proto-Slavic *-bystr, meaning "clear, lucid, limpid") may refer to:

- three villages in Bulgaria:
  - Bistritsa, Blagoevgrad Province
  - Bistritsa, Kyustendil Province
  - Bistritsa, Sofia
    - FC Vitosha Bistritsa, an association football club
    - Stadion Bistritsa, a football stadium
- a high number of rivers:
  - Pirinska Bistritsa
  - Vitoshka Bistritsa, running through Pancharevo
  - Sandanska Bistritsa, running through Sandanski in Blagoevgrad Province
  - the South Slavic name of the Haliacmon, river in Greece
- Tsarska Bistritsa, a former royal palace in Rila
- several former villages in Bulgaria:
  - one formerly known as Tursko selo until 1878 and merged with Dolno selo, Kyustendil Province in 1959
  - one merged with Razliv, Sofia Province in 1965
- an alternative name for the village of Bistrilitsa, Montana Province
- Bistritsa Grannies
- Bistritsa Monastery

== See also ==
- Bistrica (disambiguation) for the Bosnian, Croatian, Serbian and Slovenian variant
- Bistritz (disambiguation) for the German variant
- Bistrița (disambiguation) for the Romanian variant
- Bystrica (disambiguation) for the Slovak variant
- Bystrzyca (disambiguation) for the Polish variant
- Feistritz (disambiguation) (Germanised word)
