= Kiełczewice Dolne =

- Village
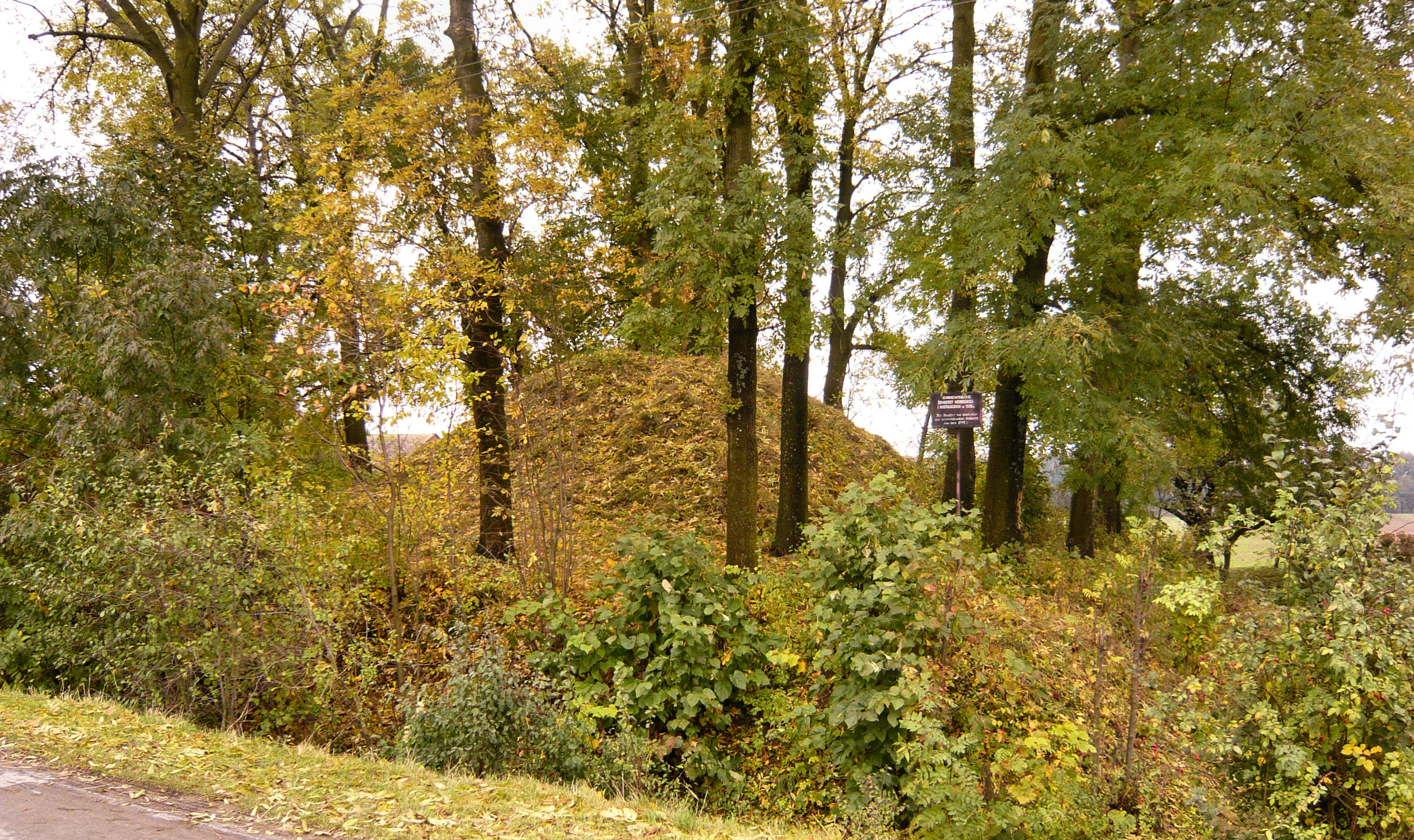

- Location within Poland
- Coordinates: 51°2′N 22°25′E
- Country: Poland
- Voivodeship: Lublin
- County: Lublin
- Gmina: Strzyżewice
- Time zone: UTC+1 (CET)
  - Summer (DST): UTC+2 (CEST)

Kiełczewice Dolne [kʲɛu̯t͡ʂɛˈvit͡sɛ ˈdɔlnɛ] is a village in the administrative district of Gmina Strzyżewice, within Lublin County, Lublin Voivodeship, in eastern Poland.

== History ==
Three Polish citizens were murdered by Nazi Germany in the village during World War II.
