= Franciszków, Lublin County =

Franciszków
- Village
- Location within Poland
- Coordinates: 51°3′16″N 22°25′32″E
- Country: Poland
- Voivodeship: Lublin
- County: Lublin
- Gmina: Strzyżewice

Franciszków (Polish pronunciation: [fraɲˈt͡ɕiʂkuf]) is a village in the administrative district of Gmina Strzyżewice, within Lublin County, Lublin Voivodeship, in eastern Poland.
