= Polanówka, Lublin County =

Polanówka
- Village
- Location within Poland
- Coordinates: 51°8′N 22°32′E
- Country: Poland
- Voivodeship: Lublin
- County: Lublin
- Gmina: Strzyżewice
- Time zone: UTC+1 (CET)
  - Summer (DST): UTC+2 (CEST)

Polanówka [pɔlaˈnufka] is a village in the administrative district of Gmina Strzyżewice, within Lublin County, Lublin Voivodeship, in eastern Poland.

== History ==
Three Polish citizens were murdered by Nazi Germany in the village during World War II.
