= Piotrowice, Lublin County =

Piotrowice
- Village
- Location within Poland
- Coordinates: 51°6′N 22°30′E
- Country: Poland
- Voivodeship: Lublin
- County: Lublin
- Gmina: Strzyżewice

Population
  - Total: 1,093

Piotrowice [pjɔtrɔˈvit͡sɛ] is a village in the administrative district of Gmina Strzyżewice, within Lublin County, Lublin Voivodeship, in eastern Poland.
