= Żabia Wola, Gmina Strzyżewice =

Żabia Wola
- Village
- Location within Poland
- Coordinates: 51°07′13″N 22°30′53″E
- Country: Poland
- Voivodeship: Lublin
- County: Lublin
- Gmina: Strzyżewice

Population
  - Total: 824

Żabia Wola [ˈʐabja ˈvɔla] is a village in the administrative district of Gmina Strzyżewice, within Lublin County, Lublin Voivodeship, in eastern Poland.
