= Poljanica Bistranska =

Coordinates: 45°54′05″N 15°52′31″E

- Interactive map of Poljanica Bistranska

Poljanica Bistranska is a village in the municipality of Bistra, Zagreb County, Croatia. In the 2011 census, it had 1,438 inhabitants.
