= Bystrytsia =

Bystrytsia (Ukrainian: Бистриця) may refer to:

- Bystrytsia (Dniester), a tributary of Dniester in the West Ukraine
- Bystrytsia (railway stop), a railway stop of the Lviv Railways
- Bystrytsia Nadvirnianska, a river in Ukraine
- Bystrytsia Solotvynska, a river in Ukraine

== See also ==
- Bistrica (disambiguation)
