= Dębina, Gmina Strzyżewice =

Dębina
- Village
- Location within Poland
- Coordinates: 51°01′47″N 22°26′34″E
- Country: Poland
- Voivodeship: Lublin
- County: Lublin
- Gmina: Strzyżewice
- Time zone: UTC+1 (CET)
  - Summer (DST): UTC+2 (CEST)

Dębina [dɛmˈbina] is a village in the administrative district of Gmina Strzyżewice, within Lublin County, Lublin Voivodeship, in eastern Poland.

== History ==
14 Polish citizens were murdered by Nazi Germany in the village during World War II.
