= Kiełczewice Górne =

- Village
- Location within Poland
- Coordinates: 51°1′N 22°26′E
- Country: Poland
- Voivodeship: Lublin
- County: Lublin
- Gmina: Strzyżewice

Kiełczewice Górne [kʲɛu̯t͡ʂɛˈvit͡sɛ ˈɡurnɛ] is a village in the administrative district of Gmina Strzyżewice, within Lublin County, Lublin Voivodeship, in eastern Poland.
