= Malá Bystřice =

- Municipality
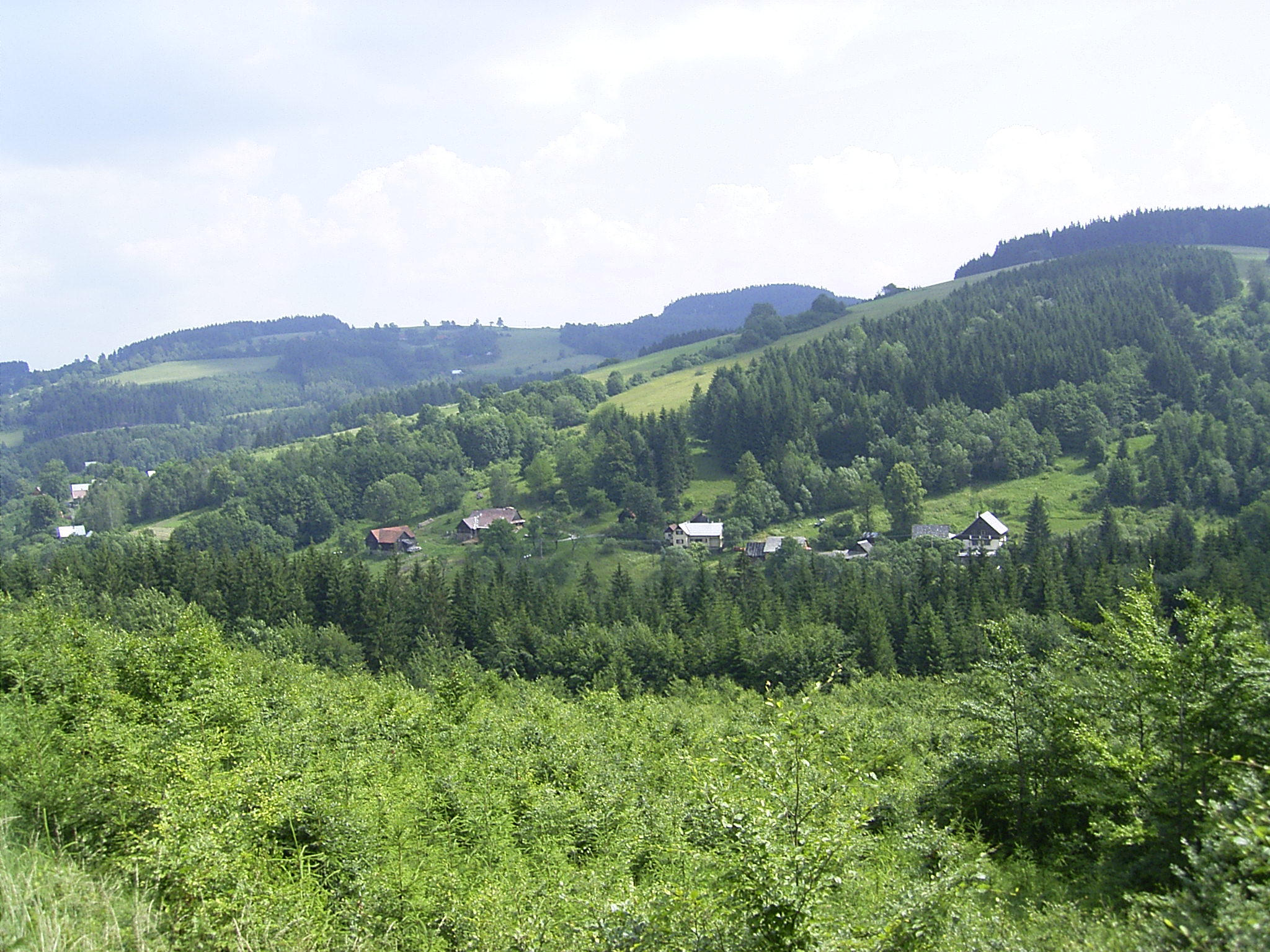
- General view

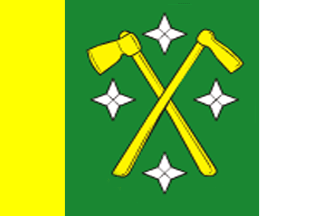
- Flag Coat of arms

- Location in the Czech Republic
- Coordinates: 49°24′34″N 18°2′55″E
- Country: Czech Republic
- Region: Zlín
- District: Vsetín
- Founded: 1620

Area
  - Total: 18.32 km^{2} (7.07 sq mi)
- Elevation: 610 m (2,000 ft)

Population (2026-01-01)
  - Total: 320
  - Density: 17/km^{2} (45/sq mi)
- Time zone: UTC+1 (CET)
  - Summer (DST): UTC+2 (CEST)
- Postal code: 756 27
- Website: malabystrice.cz

Malá Bystřice is a municipality and village in Vsetín District in the Zlín Region of the Czech Republic. It has about 300 inhabitants.

Malá Bystřice lies approximately 10 kilometres (6 mi) north-east of Vsetín, 35 km (22 mi) north-east of Zlín, and 273 km (170 mi) east of Prague.

== History ==
Bystřice was established from scattered homesteads in 1620. Since 1629, Malá Bystřice and Velká Bystřice (today Valašská Bystřice) have been distinguished separately.

== Demographics ==
Historical population
Year	Pop.	±%
1869	777	—
1880	788	+1.4%
1890	742	−5.8%
1900	779	+5.0%
1910	746	−4.2%
1921	686	−8.0%
1930	668	−2.6%
1950	476	−28.7%
1961	484	+1.7%
1970	464	−4.1%
1980	387	−16.6%
1991	342	−11.6%
2001	331	−3.2%
2011	312	−5.7%
2021	269	−13.8%
Source: Censuses
