= Borkowizna, Gmina Strzyżewice =

Borkowizna
- Village
- Location within Poland
- Coordinates: 51°0′51″N 22°25′5″E
- Country: Poland
- Voivodeship: Lublin
- County: Lublin
- Gmina: Strzyżewice

Borkowizna [bɔrkɔˈvizna] is a village in the administrative district of Gmina Strzyżewice, within Lublin County, Lublin Voivodeship, in eastern Poland.
