= Kiełczewice Pierwsze =

- Village
- Location within Poland
- Coordinates: 51°00′09″N 22°27′47″E
- Country: Poland
- Voivodeship: Lublin
- County: Lublin
- Gmina: Strzyżewice
- Elevation: 232 m (761 ft)

Population
  - Total: 81

Kiełczewice Pierwsze [kʲɛu̯t͡ʂɛˈvit͡sɛ ˈpjɛrfʂɛ] is a village in the administrative district of Gmina Strzyżewice, within Lublin County, Lublin Voivodeship, in eastern Poland.
