= Ilz, Styria =

Ilz
- Municipality
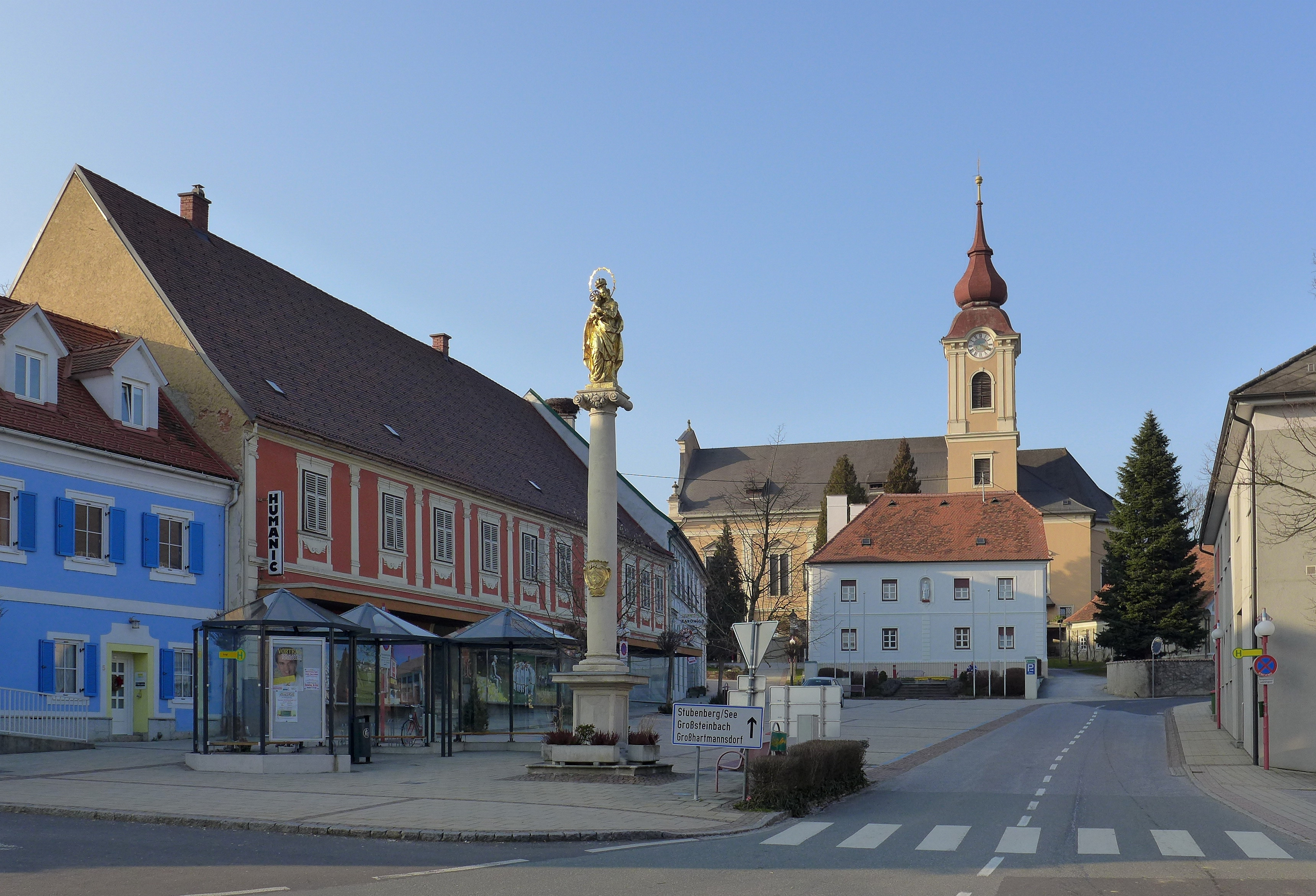
- Main square in Ilz with parish church

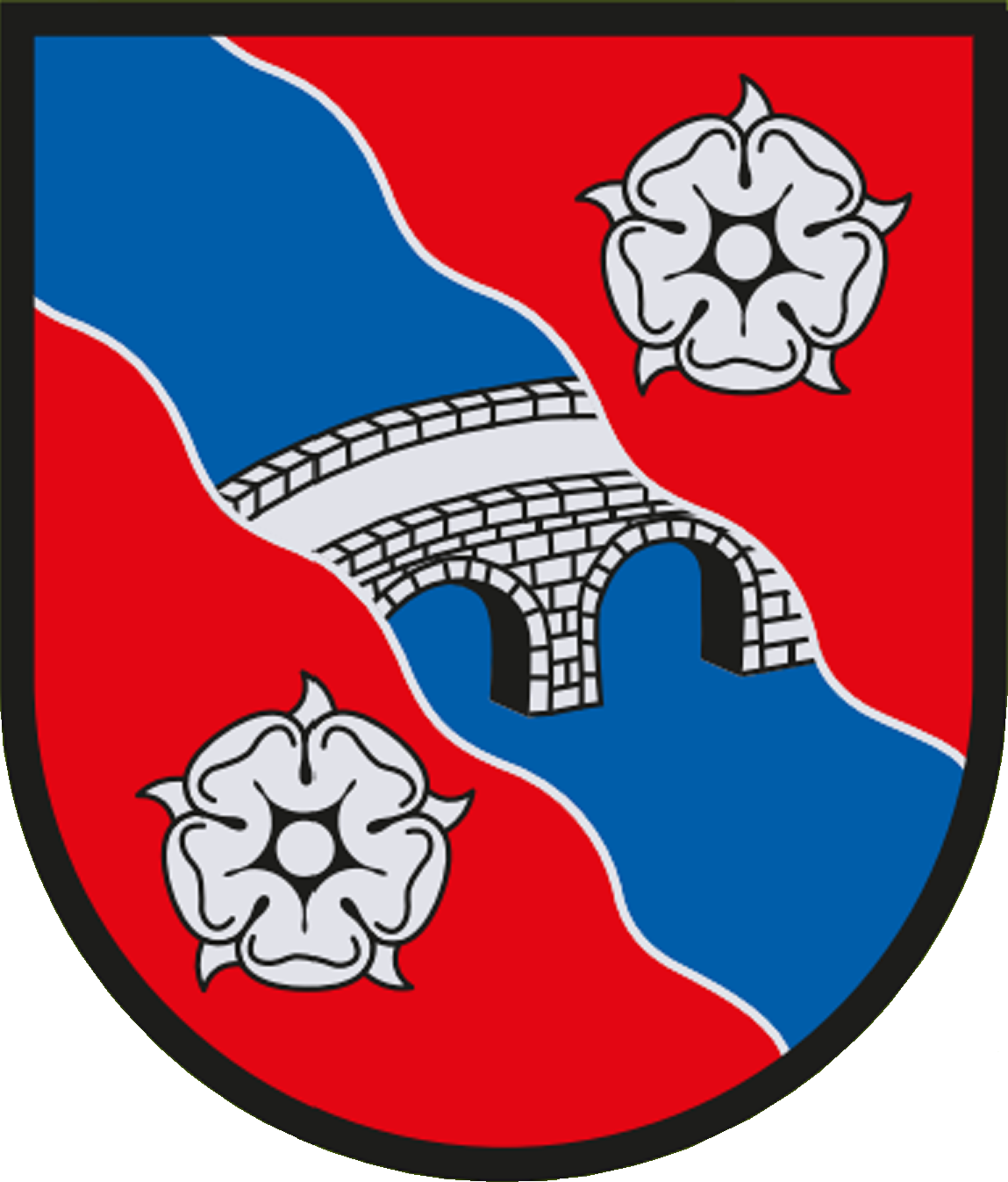
- Coat of arms

- Location within Austria
- Coordinates: 47°05′00″N 15°56′00″E
- Country: Austria
- State: Styria
- District: Hartberg-Fürstenfeld

Government
  - Mayor: Rupert Fleischhacker (ÖVP)

Area
  - Total: 39.26 km^{2} (15.16 sq mi)
- Elevation: 300 m (980 ft)

Population (2018-01-01)
  - Total: 3,736
  - Density: 95.16/km^{2} (246.5/sq mi)
- Time zone: UTC+1 (CET)
  - Summer (DST): UTC+2 (CEST)
- Postal code: 8262
- Area code: +43 3385
- Vehicle registration: HF
- Website: www.ilz.at

Ilz is a municipality in the district of Hartberg-Fürstenfeld in Styria, Austria. It is located at 47° 05' N, 15° 56' O and approx. 300 m above sea level, at the Left Bank of the river Ilz, in the 1 km wide and fruitful Ilz valley, 43 km to the east of Graz, 19 km to the east of Gleisdorf, and 13 km to the west of Fürstenfeld. It was named first in a writ issued on 14 October 1265 in Graz by Herbord of Fullnstein, who was sewer of bishop Bruno of Olmütz. In this writ a witness is mentioned: Dominus Wernherus de Ylnz, probably the vicar of that town.

== Places of interest ==
The main attraction is the baroque church.

The castle Schloss Feistritz is situated north of Ilz on the Feistritz. In the 1980s the decay of the castle was imminent but the actual owners are restoring and adapting the building. The oldest part - the tower - was built around 1200.

There are further castles in the immediate vicinity: the castle of Kalsdorf, the castle of Benndorf, and the castle of Uhlheim.

== Economy and infrastructure ==
=== Traffic ===
Ilz is situated near the Southern freeway (Exit 138) and at the Gleisdorfer highway (B65). It is starting point of the Gleichenberger highway (B66).

== Twin city ==
- Ruderting
