= Bistra, Croatia =

Bistra
- Municipality
- Općina Bistra
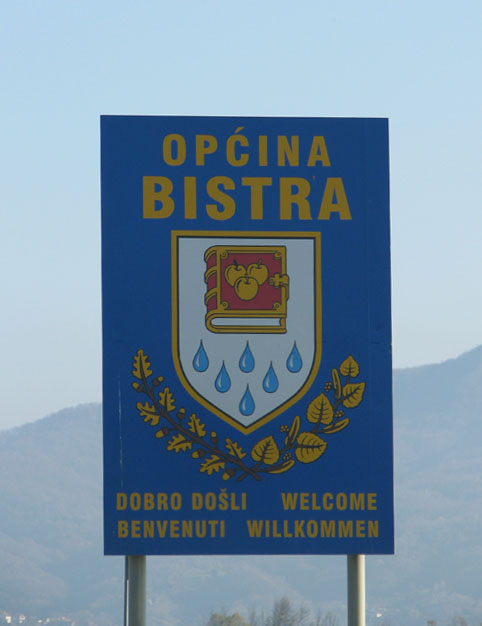
- Coat of arms

- Location of Bistra in Croatia
- Coordinates: 45°54′N 15°51′E
- Country: Croatia
- Region: Central Croatia
- County: Zagreb County
- Established: 1995
- Muni. seat: Donja Bistra
- Settlements: 6 settlements: Bukovje Bistransko; Donja Bistra (seat); Gornja Bistra; Novaki Bistranski; Oborovo Bistransko; Poljanica Bistranska

Government
  - Mayor: Krešimir Gulić (HDZ)

Area
  - Total: 52.74 km^{2} (20.36 sq mi)

Population (2011)
  - Total: 6,632
  - Density: 125.7/km^{2} (325.7/sq mi)
- Time zone: UTC+1 (CET)
  - Summer (DST): UTC+2 (CEST)
- Postal codes: 10298
- Area code: 01
- License plates: ZG
- Website: https://bistra.hr/

Bistra is a municipality (općina) in Zagreb County, Croatia. The municipality was established in 1995 by separating from the former Municipality of Zaprešić, and its municipal seat is Donja Bistra.

According to the 2011 Croatian census, there are 6,632 inhabitants, the absolute majority of whom are Croats. They live in six settlements (naselja):

- Bukovje Bistransko: 395
- Donja Bistra: 1,438
- Gornja Bistra: 1,836
- Novaki Bistranski: 763
- Oborovo Bistransko: 939
- Poljanica Bistranska: 1,261
