= Bystrica =

Bystrica may refer to:

- Banská Bystrica, a town in central Slovakia
- Burg Považská Bystrica, a manor-house underneath the castle Považský hrad
- Kalvaria Povazska Bystrica, a series of buildings depicting the journey of Jesus Christ to his crucifixion
- Nová Bystrica, a village and municipality in Čadca District, Žilina Region, northern Slovakia
- Považská Bystrica, a town in north-western Slovakia
- Stará Bystrica, a village and municipality in Čadca District, Žilina Region, northern Slovakia
- Viaduct Považská Bystrica, a bridge across the narrowest part of Považská Bystrica in Slovakia
- Záhorská Bystrica

== See also ==
- Bistrica (disambiguation)
- Bistritsa (disambiguation)
- Bistritz (disambiguation)
- Bistrița (disambiguation)
- Bystřice (disambiguation) (Czech variant)
- Bystrzyca (disambiguation) (Polish variant)
- Feistritz (disambiguation) (Germanised word)
