= Strzyżewice, Lublin Voivodeship =

Strzyżewice
- Village
- Location within Poland
- Coordinates: 51°3′N 22°26′E
- Country: Poland
- Voivodeship: Lublin
- County: Lublin
- Gmina: Strzyżewice
- Website: http://www.strzyzewice.lubelskie.pl/

Strzyżewice [stʂɨʐɛˈvit͡sɛ] is a village in Lublin County, Lublin Voivodeship, in eastern Poland. It is the seat of the gmina (administrative district) called Gmina Strzyżewice.
