= Pawłów, Lublin County =

Pawłów
- Village
- Location within Poland
- Coordinates: 51°03′17″N 22°28′58″E
- Country: Poland
- Voivodeship: Lublin
- County: Lublin
- Gmina: Strzyżewice

Population (approx.)
  - Total: 235
- Time zone: UTC+1 (CET)
  - Summer (DST): UTC+2 (CEST)

Pawłów [ˈpavwuf] is a village in the administrative district of Gmina Strzyżewice, within Lublin County, Lublin Voivodeship, in eastern Poland.

== History ==
Seven Polish citizens were murdered by Nazi Germany in the village during World War II.
