= Gmina Strzyżewice =

Gmina Strzyżewice Strzyżewice Commune
- Gmina
- Interactive map of Gmina Strzyżewice
- Coordinates (Strzyżewice): 51°3′N 22°26′E
- Country: Poland
- Voivodeship: Lublin
- County: Lublin County
- Seat: Strzyżewice

Area
  - Total: 108.84 km^{2} (42.02 sq mi)

Population (2019)
  - Total: 8,078
  - Density: 74.22/km^{2} (192.2/sq mi)
- Website: http://www.strzyzewice.lubelskie.pl

Gmina Strzyżewice is a rural gmina (administrative district) in Lublin County, Lublin Voivodeship, in eastern Poland. Its seat is the village of Strzyżewice, which lies approximately 24 kilometres (15 mi) south-west of the regional capital Lublin.

The gmina covers an area of 108.84 square kilometres (42.0 sq mi), and as of 2019 its total population is 8,078 (7,936 in 2013).

== Villages ==
Gmina Strzyżewice contains the villages and settlements of Borkowizna, Bystrzyca Nowa, Bystrzyca Stara, Dębina, Dębszczyzna, Franciszków, Iżyce, Kajetanówka, Kiełczewice Dolne, Kiełczewice Górne, Kiełczewice Maryjskie, Kiełczewice Pierwsze, Kolonia Kiełczewice Dolne, Osmolice, Pawłów, Pawłówek, Piotrowice, Polanówka, Pszczela Wola, Strzyżewice and Żabia Wola.

== Neighbouring gminas ==
Gmina Strzyżewice is bordered by the gminas of Bychawa, Głusk, Jabłonna, Niedrzwica Duża, Wilkołaz and Zakrzówek.
