= Kolonia Kiełczewice Dolne =

- Village
- Location within Poland
- Coordinates: 51°01′42″N 22°24′13″E
- Country: Poland
- Voivodeship: Lublin
- County: Lublin
- Gmina: Strzyżewice

Kolonia Kiełczewice Dolne [kɔˈlɔɲa kʲɛu̯t͡ʂɛˈvit͡sɛ ˈdɔlnɛ] is a village in the administrative district of Gmina Strzyżewice, within Lublin County, Lublin Voivodeship, in eastern Poland.
