= Bistrice =

Bistrice may refer to:

- Bistrice, Montenegro, a village in the municipality of Zeta
- Bistricë (disambiguation)

== See also ==
- Bistrica (disambiguation)
