= Beastro (video game) =

- Developer: Timberline Studio
- Publisher: Timberline Studio
- Engine: Unreal Engine 5
- Platforms: PlayStation 5, Windows, Xbox Series X/S
- Release: June 11, 2026
- Mode: Single-player

Beastro is a cozy culinary adventure game released and developed by Timberline Studio. It was released on June 11, 2026 for PlayStation 5, Xbox Series, and Windows.

== Development ==
Developer Timberline Studio is based in the Los Angeles, California. The first official reveal trailer for Beastro was released in 2025, specifically on August 20, during the Xbox @ gamescom 2025 event.

== Gameplay ==
Beastro's gameplay combines the fast pace of a restaurant simulator with the strategy of turn-based card battles. The game cycle is perfectly divided between Day (in the kitchen) and Night (on missions).

== Reception ==
Beastro was reviewed by Polygon, Game Informer, and CG Magazine.
