= Bistrica, Jajce =

Bistrica Бистрица
- Village
- Location within Bosnia and Herzegovina
- Coordinates: 44°22′51″N 17°20′41″E
- Country: Bosnia and Herzegovina
- Entity: Federation of Bosnia and Herzegovina
- Canton: Central Bosnia
- Municipality: Jajce

Area
  - Total: 2.66 sq mi (6.89 km^{2})

Population (2013)
  - Total: 909
  - Density: 342/sq mi (132/km^{2})
- Time zone: UTC+1 (CET)
  - Summer (DST): UTC+2 (CEST)

Bistrica (Serbian Cyrillic: Бистрица) is a village in the municipality of Jajce, Bosnia and Herzegovina.

== Demographics ==
According to the 2013 census, its population was 909.

Ethnicity in 2013
Ethnicity	Number	Percentage
Croats	649	71.4%
Bosniaks	249	27.4%
Serbs	3	0.3%
other/undeclared	8	0.9%
Total	909	100%
