= Bistrița (disambiguation) =

Bistrița is a city in Romania.

Bistrița may also refer to several other rivers, settlements, and mountains in Romania:

== Rivers and mountains ==
- Bistrița (Iza), a small tributary of the Iza in Maramureș County
- Bistrița (Olt), a tributary of the Olt in Vâlcea County
- Bistrița (Siret), a tributary of the Siret in Bistrița-Năsăud, Suceava, Neamț and Bacău Counties
- Bistrița (Someș), a tributary of the Șieu in Bistrița-Năsăud County
- Bistrița (Tismana), a tributary of the Tismana in Gorj County
- Bistrița Mountains, mountain range in northern central Romania

== Settlements and counties ==
- Bistrița, a village in Alexandru cel Bun Commune, Neamț County
- Bistrița, a village in Costești Commune, Vâlcea County
- Bistrița, a village in Hinova Commune, Mehedinţi County
- Bistrița Bârgăului, a commune in Bistrița-Năsăud County
- Bistrița-Năsăud County
- Bistrița Nouă, a village administered by Piatra-Olt town, Olt County
- Bistrița Monastery, Neamț County
- Berești-Bistrița, a commune in Bacău County

== See also ==
- Bistrica (disambiguation)
- Bistritsa (disambiguation)
- Bystrica (disambiguation)
- Bistritz (disambiguation)
- Bystrzyca (disambiguation)
- Feistritz (disambiguation)
- Bistra (disambiguation)
