= Bistrica, Žepče =

Bistrica
- Village
- Location within Bosnia and Herzegovina
- Coordinates: 44.4174395°N 18.0683305°E
- Country: Bosnia and Herzegovina
- Entity: Federation of Bosnia and Herzegovina
- Canton: Zenica-Doboj
- Municipality: Žepče

Area
  - Total: 4.66 sq mi (12.06 km^{2})

Population (2013)
  - Total: 978
  - Density: 210/sq mi (81.1/km^{2})
- Time zone: UTC+1 (CET)
  - Summer (DST): UTC+2 (CEST)

Bistrica is a village in the municipality of Žepče, Bosnia and Herzegovina.

== Demographics ==
According to the 2013 census, its population was 978.

Ethnicity in 2013
Ethnicity	Number	Percentage
Croats	845	86.4%
Serbs	125	12.8%
Bosniaks	1	0.1%
other/undeclared	7	0.7%
Total	978	100%
