= Bistrica, Banja Luka =

Bistrica Бистрица (Serbian)
- Village (Selo)
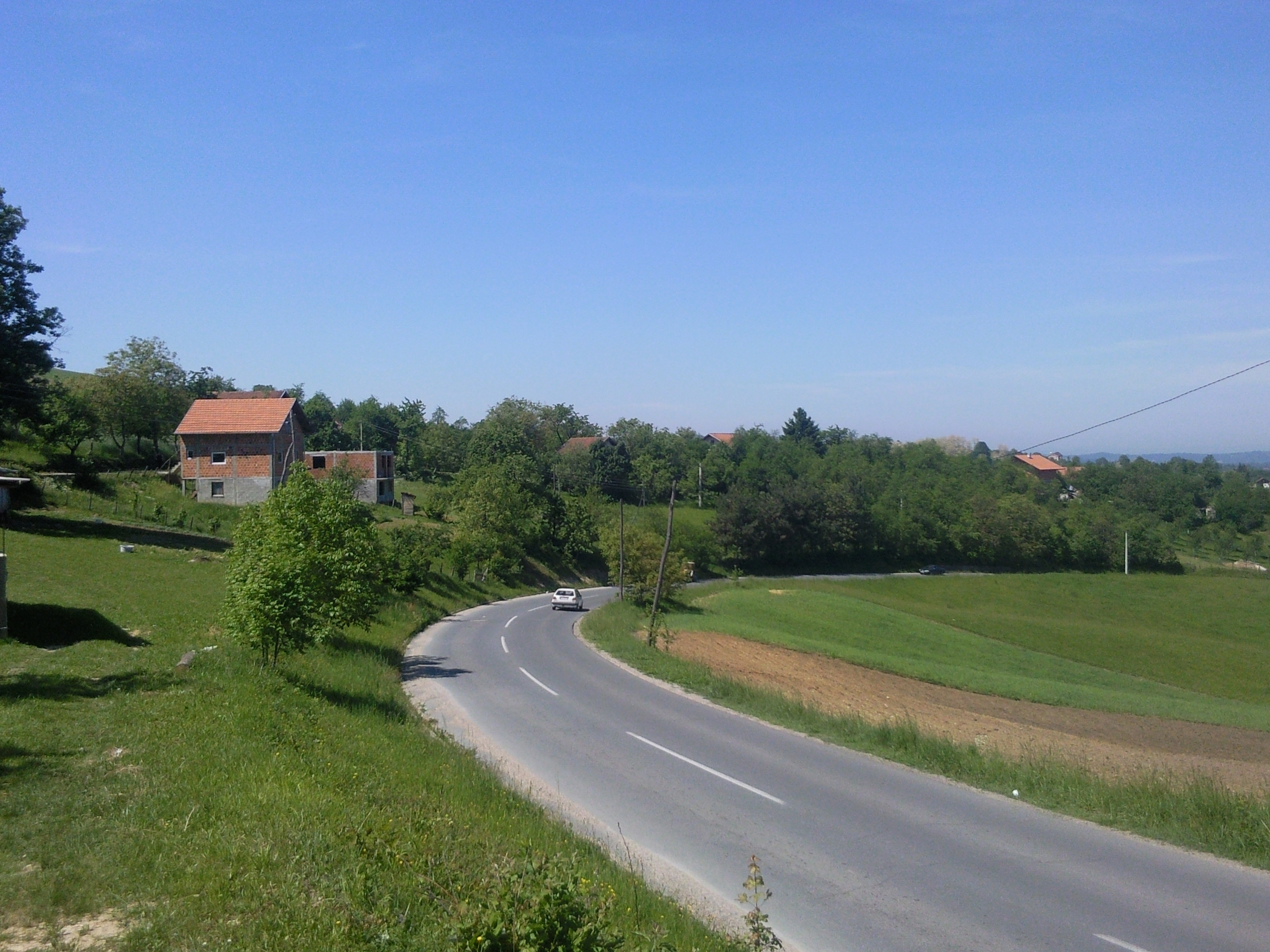
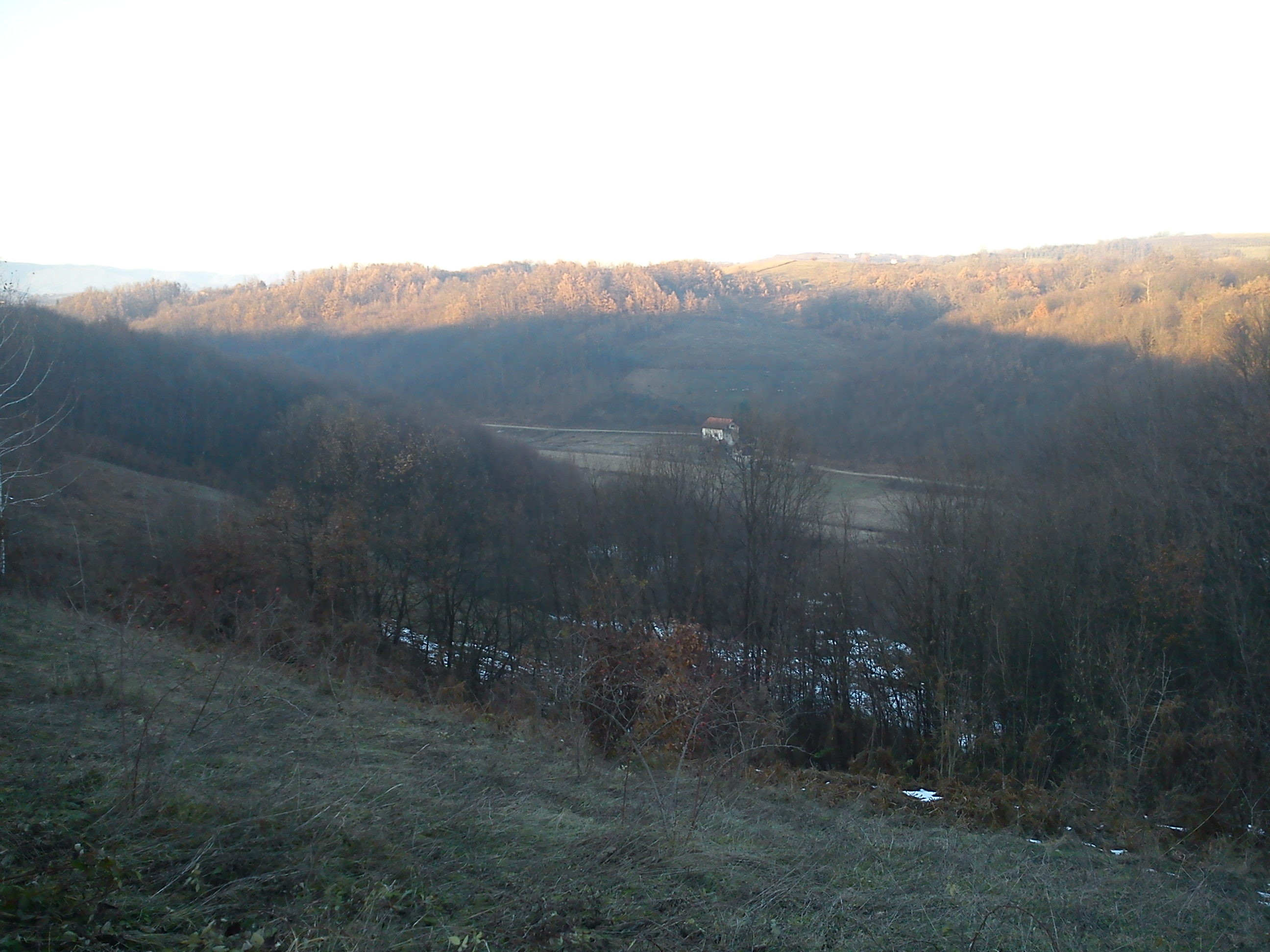
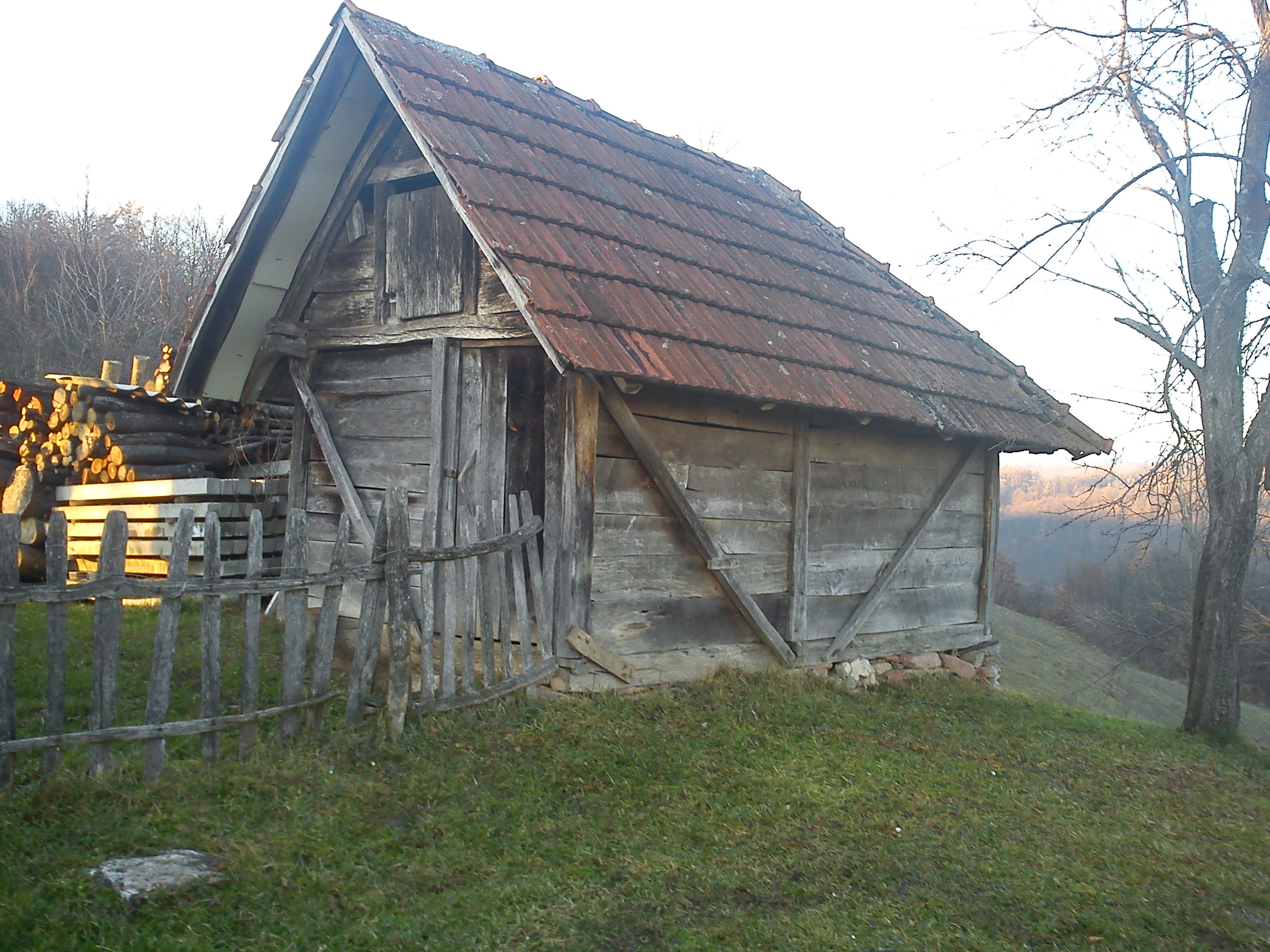
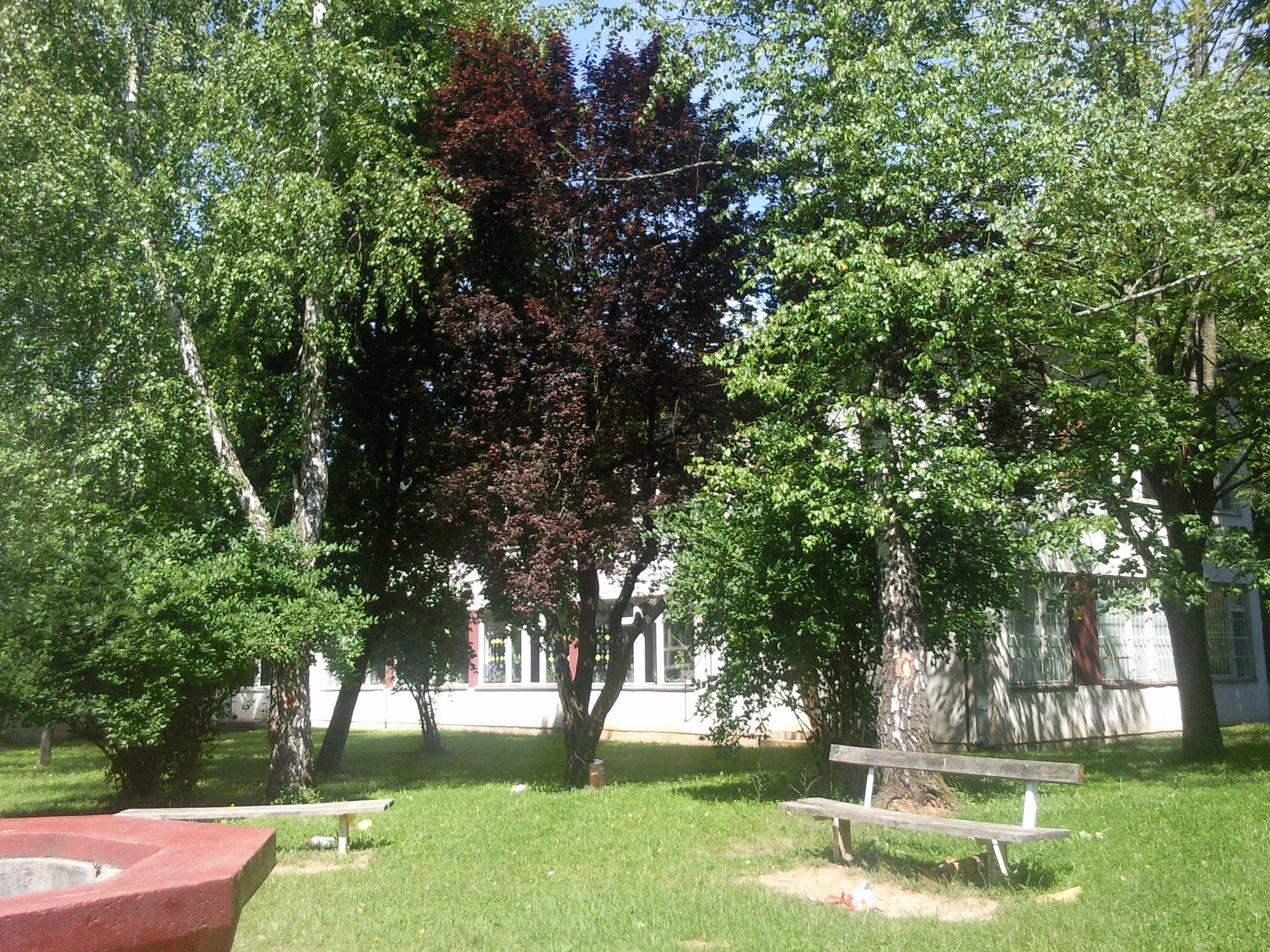

- Location within Bosnia and Herzegovina
- Coordinates: 44°48′49″N 17°02′25″E
- Country: Bosnia and Herzegovina
- Entity: Republika Srpska
- Municipality: Banja Luka

Population (2013)
  - Total: 1,386
- Time zone: UTC+1 (CET)
  - Summer (DST): UTC+2 (CEST)

Bistrica (Serbian Cyrillic: Бистрица) is a village in the municipality of Banja Luka, Republika Srpska, Bosnia and Herzegovina.

== Demographics ==
Ethnic groups in the village include:

- 1,363 Serbs (98.34%)
- 23 Others (1.66%)
