= Donja Bistra =

Coordinates: 45°54′17″N 15°51′13″E

- Interactive map of Donja Bistra

Donja Bistra is a village in the municipality of Bistra, Zagreb County, Croatia. In the 2011 census, it had 1,438 inhabitants.
