= Bistrica, Bitola =

Bistrica
- Village
- Бистрица
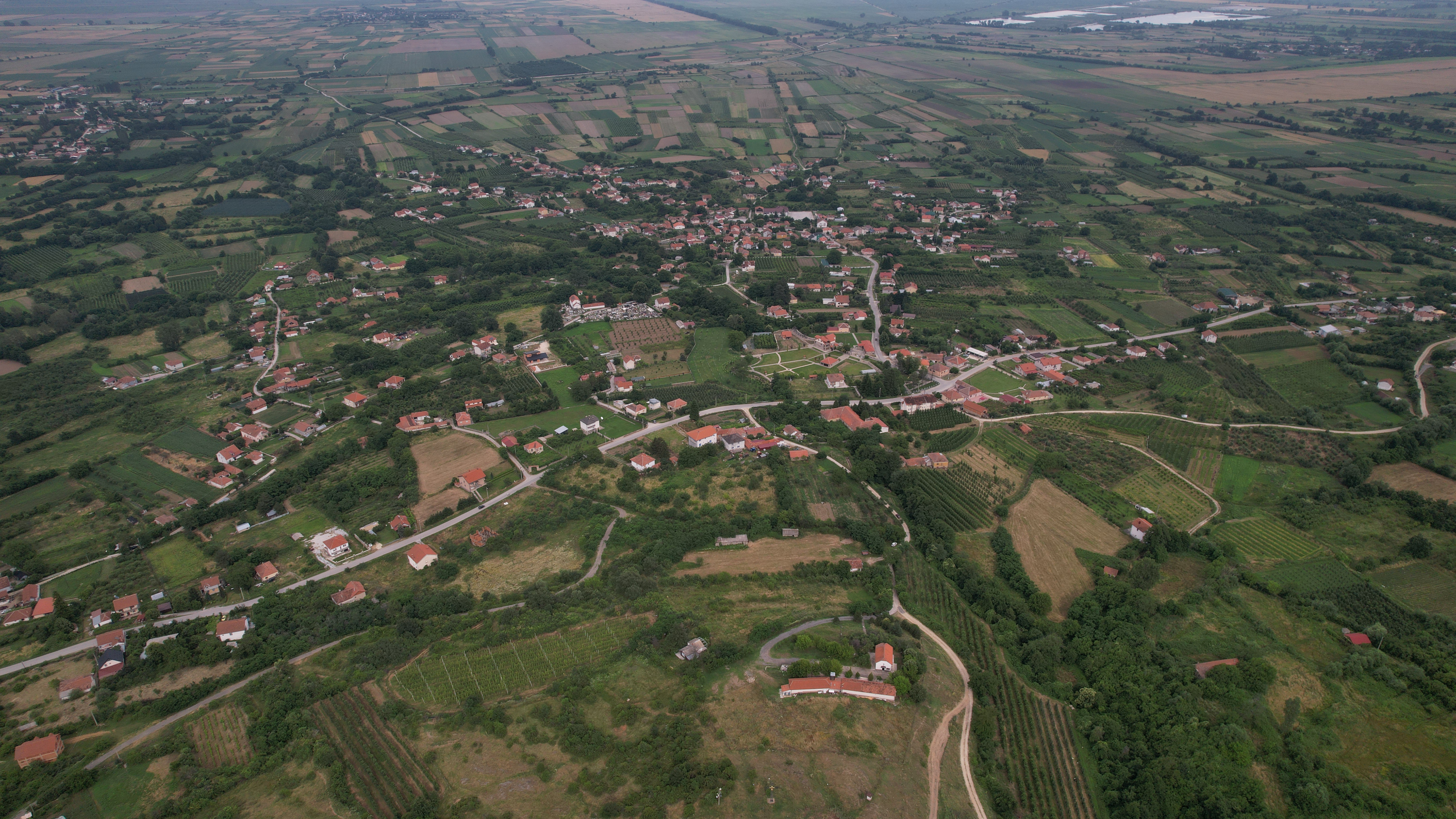
- Air view of the village Bistrica

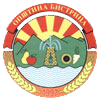
- Seal

- Location within North Macedonia
- Coordinates: 40°58′45″N 21°21′48″E
- Country: North Macedonia
- Region: Pelagonia
- Municipality: Bitola

Population (2002)
  - Total: 1,015
- Time zone: UTC+1 (CET)
  - Summer (DST): UTC+2 (CEST)
- Car plates: BT
- Website: .

Bistrica (Macedonian: Бистрица) is a village in the municipality of Bitola, North Macedonia. It lies about 6.31 kilometres away from Bitola, which is the second largest city in North Macedonia.

== Demographics ==
Bistrica is attested in the Ottoman defter of 1467/68 as a village in the vilayet of Manastir. The inhabitants attested largely bore typical Slavic anthroponyms along with a few instances of Albanian ones, such as Тode Arbanash, Gerg son of Pelegrin or Dimitri son of Prift.

According to the 2002 census, the village had a total of 1015 inhabitants. Ethnic groups in the village include:

- Macedonians 949
- Albanians 55
- Serbs 8
- Others 3
