= Bystřice (Jičín District) =

- Municipality
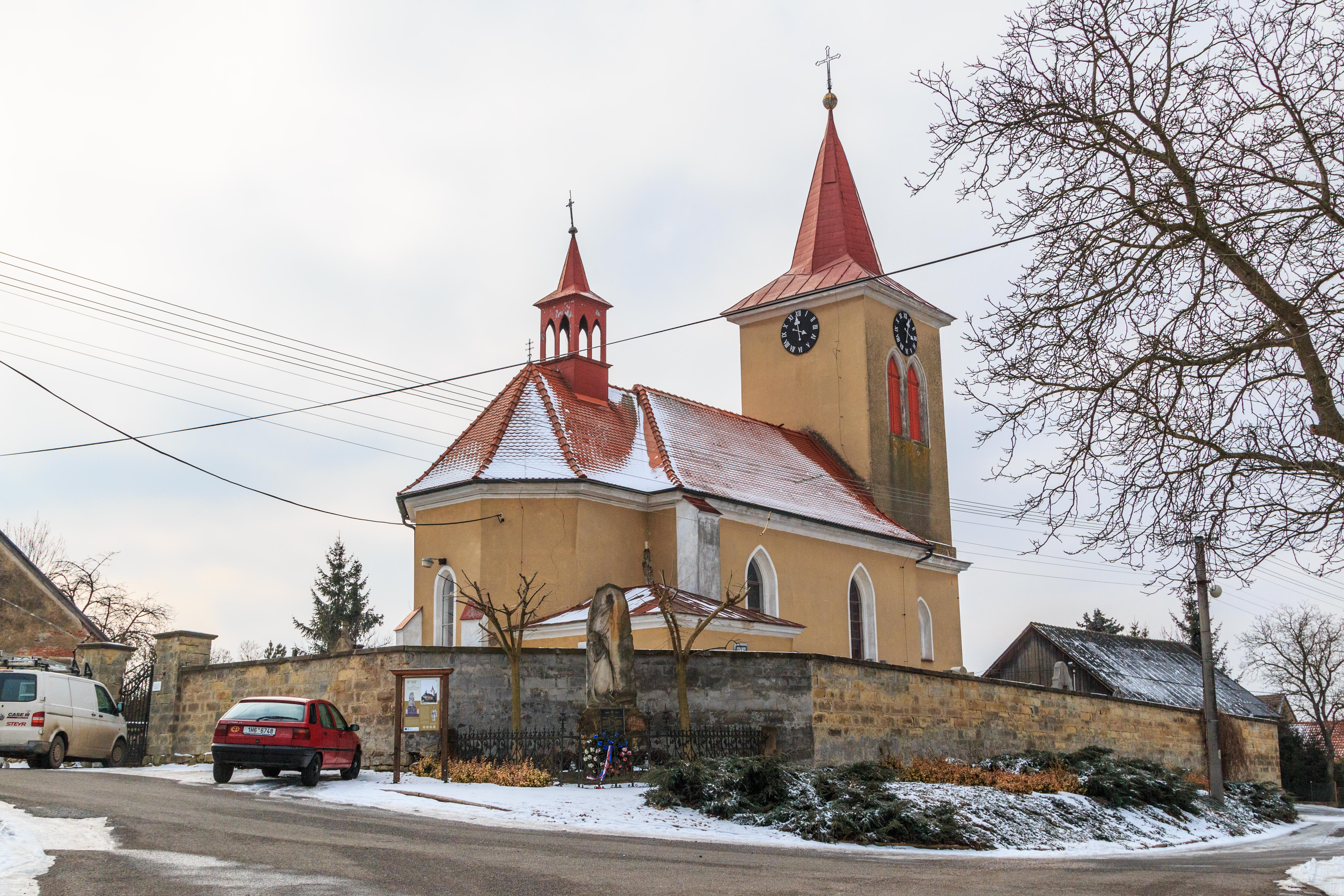
- Church of the Assumption of the Virgin Mary

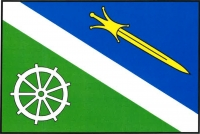
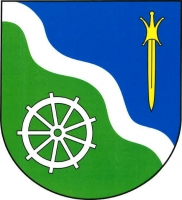
- Flag Coat of arms

- Location in the Czech Republic
- Coordinates: 50°23′35″N 15°14′39″E
- Country: Czech Republic
- Region: Hradec Králové
- District: Jičín
- First mentioned: 1365

Area
  - Total: 7.02 km^{2} (2.71 sq mi)
- Elevation: 283 m (928 ft)

Population (2026-01-01)
  - Total: 362
  - Density: 51.6/km^{2} (134/sq mi)
- Time zone: UTC+1 (CET)
  - Summer (DST): UTC+2 (CEST)
- Postal code: 507 23
- Website: www.obecbystrice.cz

Bystřice is a municipality and village in Jičín District in the Hradec Králové Region of the Czech Republic. It has about 400 inhabitants.

== Administrative division ==
Bystřice consists of two municipal parts (in brackets population according to the 2021 census):

- Bystřice (313)
- Važice (25)

== Etymology ==
The name Bystřice was transferred from the name of the local stream Bystřice. The name of the stream was derived from the Old Czech adjective bystrá, which used to mean 'fast-flowing', 'rapid'.

== Demographics ==
Historical population
Year	Pop.	±%
1869	695	—
1880	729	+4.9%
1890	740	+1.5%
1900	739	−0.1%
1910	693	−6.2%
1921	667	−3.8%
1930	575	−13.8%
1950	416	−27.7%
1961	373	−10.3%
1970	321	−13.9%
1980	299	−6.9%
1991	318	+6.4%
2001	307	−3.5%
2011	314	+2.3%
2021	338	+7.6%
Source: Censuses
