= Včelákov =

- Market town
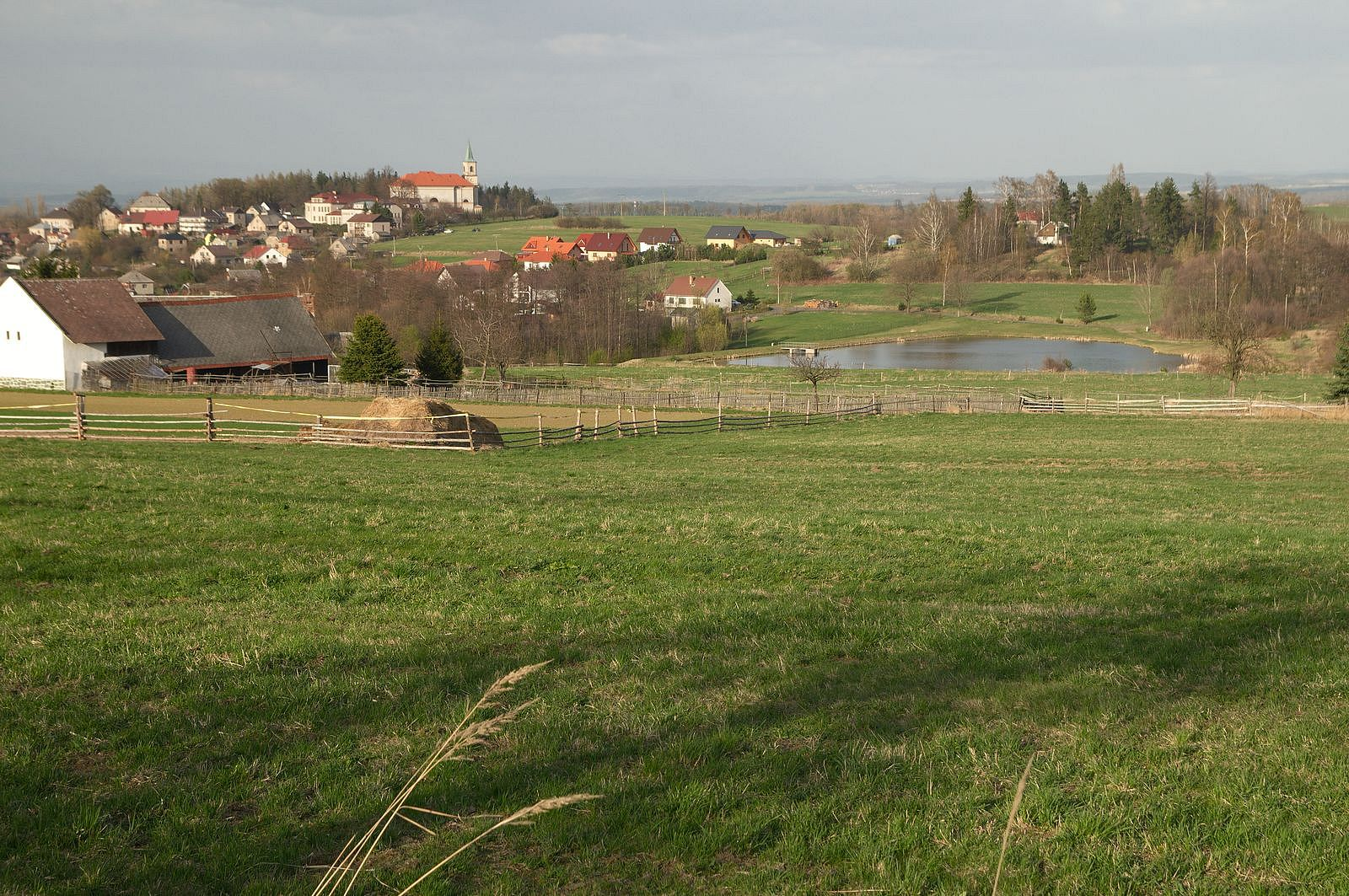
- General view of Včelákov

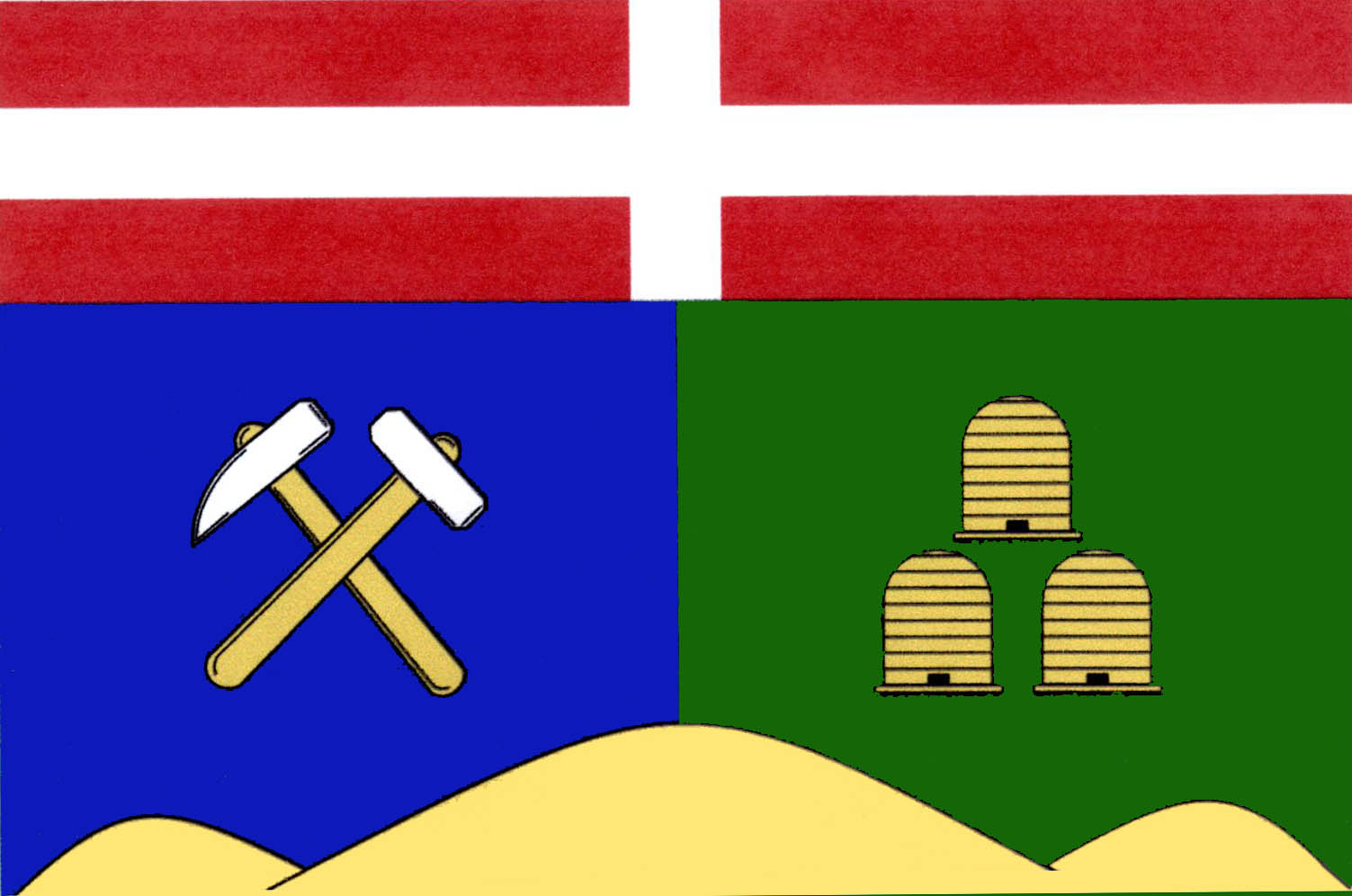
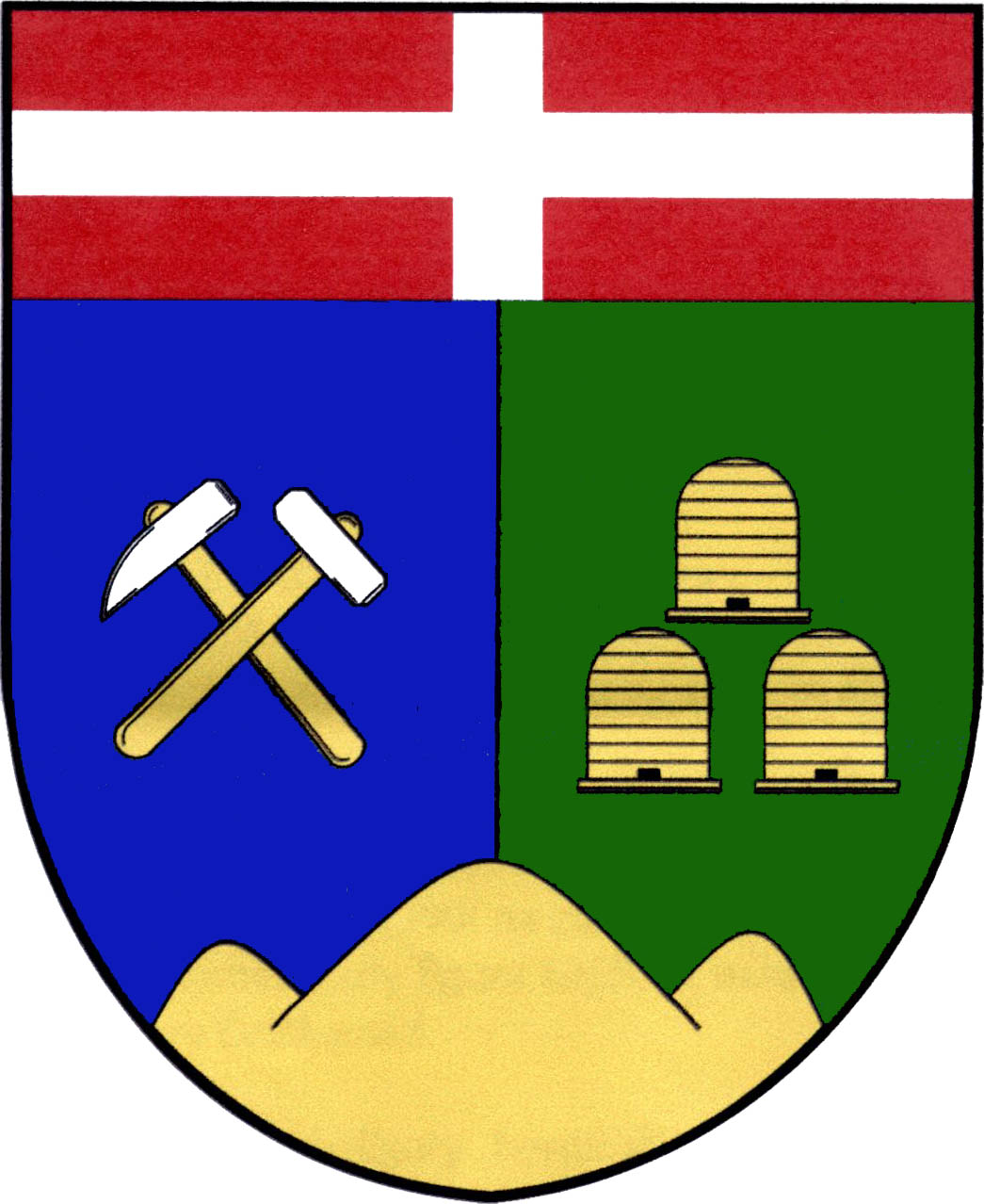
- Flag Coat of arms

- Location in the Czech Republic
- Coordinates: 49°49′4″N 15°53′4″E
- Country: Czech Republic
- Region: Pardubice
- District: Chrudim
- First mentioned: 1349

Area
  - Total: 13.57 km^{2} (5.24 sq mi)
- Elevation: 493 m (1,617 ft)

Population (2026-01-01)
  - Total: 562
  - Density: 41.4/km^{2} (107/sq mi)
- Time zone: UTC+1 (CET)
  - Summer (DST): UTC+2 (CEST)
- Postal codes: 539 01, 539 57
- Website: www.vcelakov.cz

Včelákov (Czech pronunciation: [ˈftʃɛlaːkof]) is a market town in Chrudim District in the Pardubice Region of the Czech Republic. It has about 600 inhabitants.

== Administrative division ==
Včelákov consists of seven municipal parts (in brackets population according to the 2021 census):

- Včelákov (280)
- Bystřice (59)
- Dolní Babákov (63)
- Hůrka (1)
- Příkrakov (37)
- Střítež (36)
- Vyhnánov (54)

== Etymology ==
The original name of the settlement was Čelákov. The name was derived from the personal name Čelák, meaning "Čelák's (property)". Due to its similarity with the word včela ('bee'), the name changed to Včelákov over time.

== Geography ==
Včelákov is located about 16 kilometres (10 mi) south of Chrudim and 25 km (16 mi) south of Pardubice. It lies in the Iron Mountains and partly within the Železné hory Protected Landscape Area. The highest point is at 628 m (2,060 ft) above sea level.

== History ==
The first written mention of Včelákov is from 1349. The village was probably founded by the monastery in Podlažice. The monastery owned Včelákov until 1421, when the Hussites burned down the monastery. Until the 19th century, various ores were mined around the village: iron, copper, lead and silver. In 1867, Včelákov was promoted to a market town.

== Demographics ==
Historical population

Year	Pop.	±%
1869	1,328	—
1880	1,251	−5.8%
1890	1,225	−2.1%
1900	1,218	−0.6%
1910	1,222	+0.3%

Year	Pop.	±%
1921	1,156	−5.4%
1930	1,242	+7.4%
1950	847	−31.8%
1961	883	+4.3%
1970	767	−13.1%

Year	Pop.	±%
1980	651	−15.1%
1991	615	−5.5%
2001	548	−10.9%
2011	569	+3.8%
2021	530	−6.9%

Source: Censuses

== Transport ==
There are no railways or major roads passing through the municipality.

== Sights ==
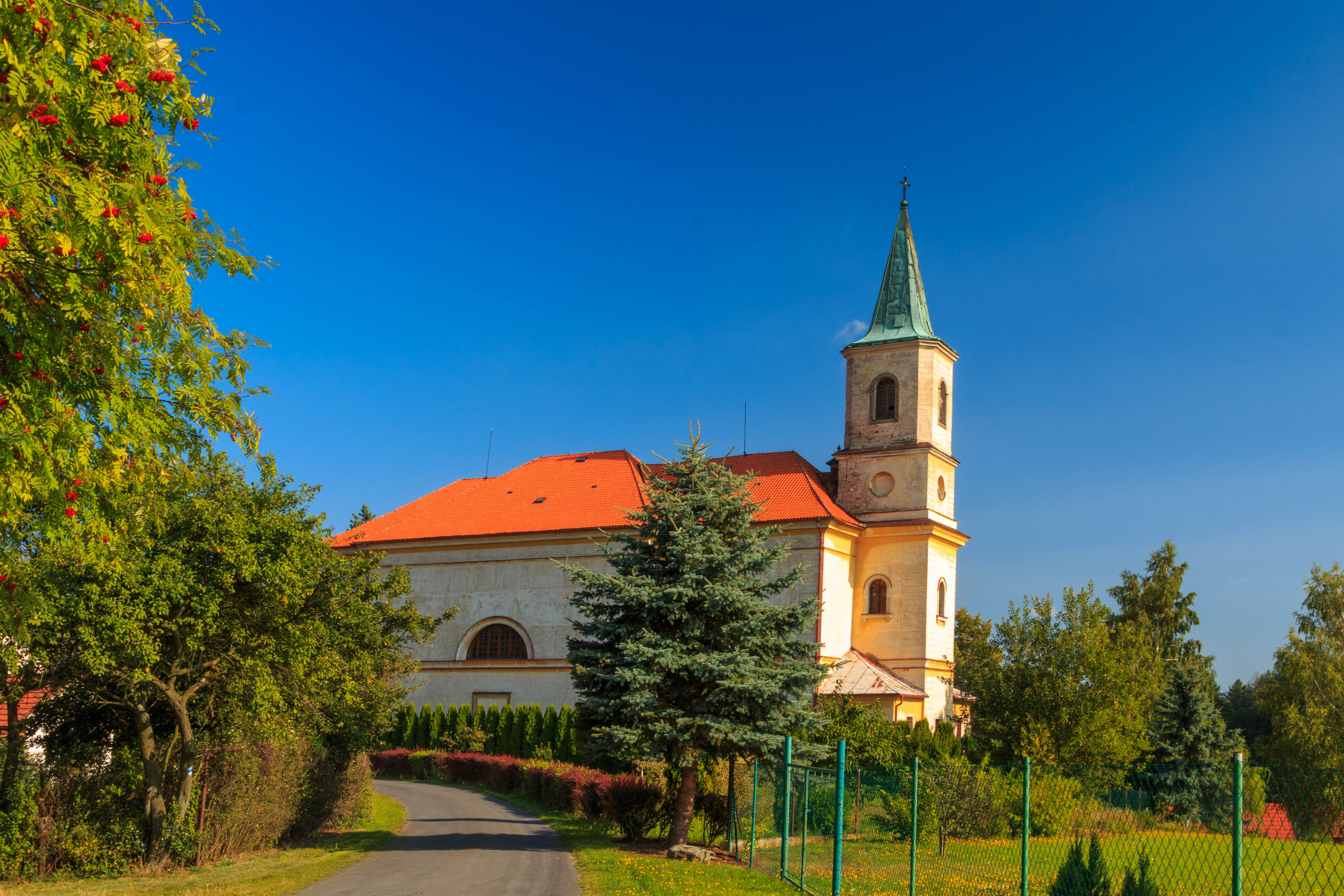
Church of Saint Mary Magdalene

The main landmark of Včelákov is the Church of Saint Mary Magdalene. It was built in the late Neoclassical style in 1844–1848.
