= Bistra (peak) =

Mountain in Kosovo

Bistra (Bister, Bistra, Bistrica, Bistër) is a peak in the Šar Mountains found in Kosovo. Bistra is located at 42.1388°N 20.9726°E and reaches a top height of 2,611 m (8,566 ft).
