= Bistro (disambiguation) =

Bistro is a type of restaurant.

Bistro may also refer to:

- 2038 Bistro, an asteroid named after the restaurant
- "Bistro," a song by Madvillain from their album Madvillainy
- Bistro, Novi Travnik, a village in Bosnia and Herzegovina
- Bistro filet or shoulder tender, a cut of beef
- An abbreviation for BSD distribution, that is an operating system descended from BSD, e.g. FreeBSD.
