= Schloss Feistritz (Ilz) =

Castle in Styria, Austria

Coordinates: 47°07′22″N 15°54′47″E

- Styria, Austria
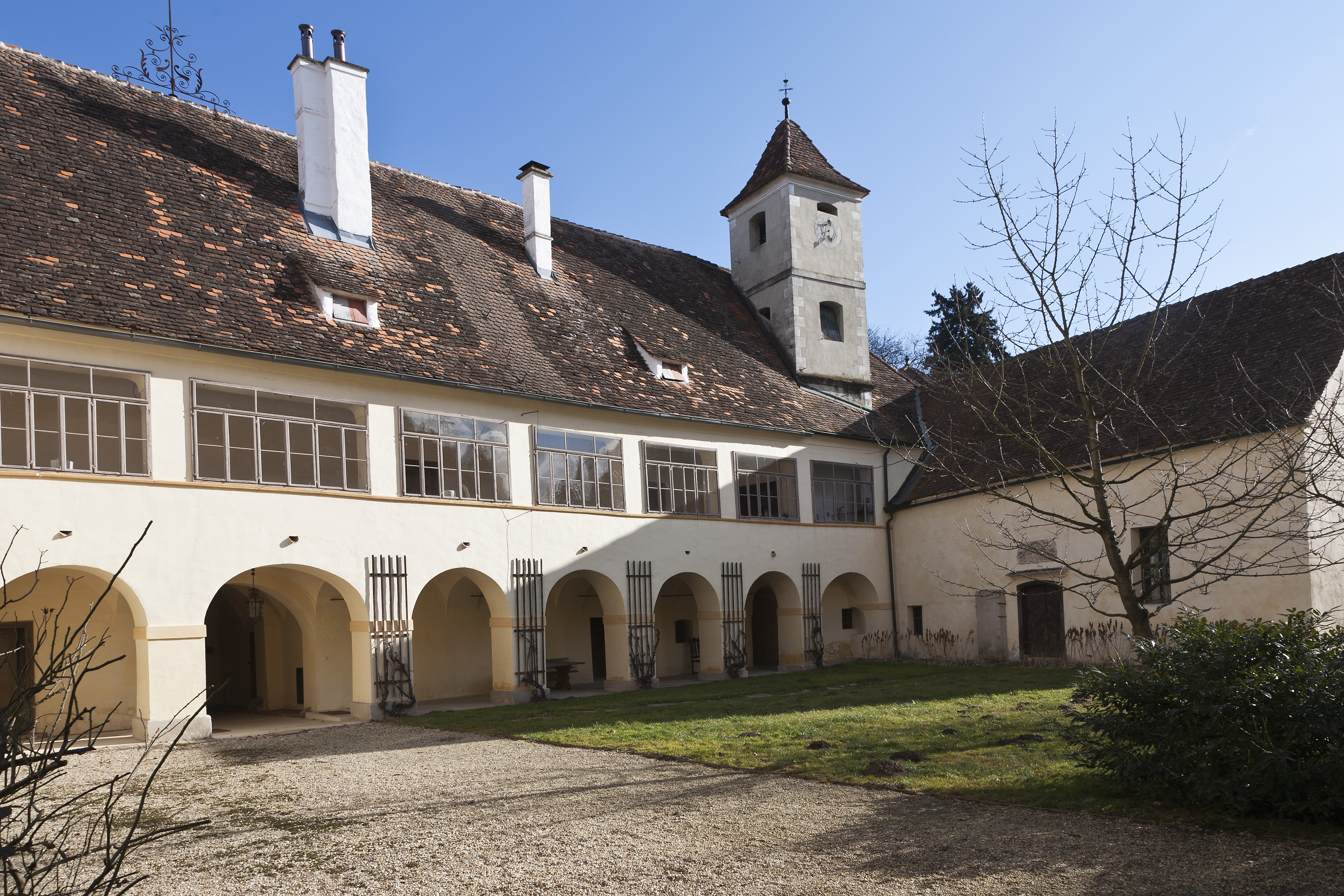

Site information
- Type: Castle

Site history
- Built: 1122
- Built by: Hartwig von Reidling

Schloss Feistritz is a castle north of Ilz in Styria, Austria. Schloss Feistritz is situated at an elevation of 304 meters.

== See also ==
- List of castles in Austria
