= Bystrzyca Stara =

- Village
- Location within Poland
- Coordinates: 51°5′N 22°28′E
- Country: Poland
- Voivodeship: Lublin
- County: Lublin
- Gmina: Strzyżewice

Population
  - Total: 451

Bystrzyca Stara [bɨsˈtʂɨt͡sa ˈstara] is a village in the administrative district of Gmina Strzyżewice, within Lublin County, Lublin Voivodeship, in eastern Poland.

The first known mention of Bystrzyca Stara dates back to 1399. The village has a primary school, a middle school and a church.
