= Novaki Bistranski =

- Village
- Location within Croatia
- Coordinates: 45°53′N 15°52′E
- Country: Croatia
- County: Zagreb County

Area
  - Total: 11.3 km^{2} (4.4 sq mi)

Population (2021)
  - Total: 812
  - Density: 71.9/km^{2} (186/sq mi)
- Time zone: UTC+1 (CET)
  - Summer (DST): UTC+2 (CEST)

Novaki Bistranski is a village in Croatia.
