= Bistrica, Zenica =

Bistrica Бистрица
- Village
- Location within Bosnia and Herzegovina
- Coordinates: 44°21′20″N 17°53′54″E
- Country: Bosnia and Herzegovina
- Entity: Federation of Bosnia and Herzegovina
- Canton: Zenica-Doboj
- Municipality: Zenica

Area
  - Total: 1.73 sq mi (4.49 km^{2})

Population (2013)
  - Total: 585
  - Density: 337/sq mi (130/km^{2})
- Time zone: UTC+1 (CET)
  - Summer (DST): UTC+2 (CEST)

Bistrica (Cyrillic: Бистрица) is a village in the City of Zenica, Bosnia and Herzegovina.

== Demographics ==
According to the 2013 census, its population was 585.

Ethnicity in 2013
Ethnicity	Number	Percentage
Bosniaks	582	99.5%
other/undeclared	3	0.5%
Total	585	100%
