= Bistro, Novi Travnik =

Bistro
- Village
- Location within Bosnia and Herzegovina
- Coordinates: 44.1080777°N 17.6608879°E
- Country: Bosnia and Herzegovina
- Entity: Federation of Bosnia and Herzegovina
- Canton: Central Bosnia
- Municipality: Novi Travnik

Area
  - Total: 3.83 sq mi (9.91 km^{2})

Population (2013)
  - Total: 355
  - Density: 92.8/sq mi (35.8/km^{2})
- Time zone: UTC+1 (CET)
  - Summer (DST): UTC+2 (CEST)

Bistro is a village in the municipality of Novi Travnik, Bosnia and Herzegovina.

== Demographics ==
According to the 2013 census, its population was 355.

Ethnicity in 2013
Ethnicity	Number	Percentage
Bosniaks	352	99.2%
Croats	2	0.6%
other/undeclared	1	0.3%
Total	355	100%
