= Bystrzyca Nowa =

- Village
- Location within Poland
- Coordinates: 51°4′N 22°27′E
- Country: Poland
- Voivodeship: Lublin
- County: Lublin
- Gmina: Strzyżewice

Bystrzyca Nowa [bɨsˈtʂɨt͡sa ˈnɔva] is a village in the administrative district of Gmina Strzyżewice, within Lublin County, Lublin Voivodeship, in eastern Poland.
