= Bistrica, Leposavić =

Bistrica Bistricë
- Village
- Location within Kosovo
- Location: Kosovo
- District: Mitrovica
- Municipality: Leposaviq

Population (2024)
  - Total: 62
- Time zone: UTC+1 (CET)
  - Summer (DST): UTC+2 (CEST)
- Area code: +383

Bistrica (Serbian Cyrillic: Бистрица, Albanian indefinite form: Bistricë) is a village in Leposavić municipality, northern Kosovo.
