= Valašská Bystřice =

- Municipality
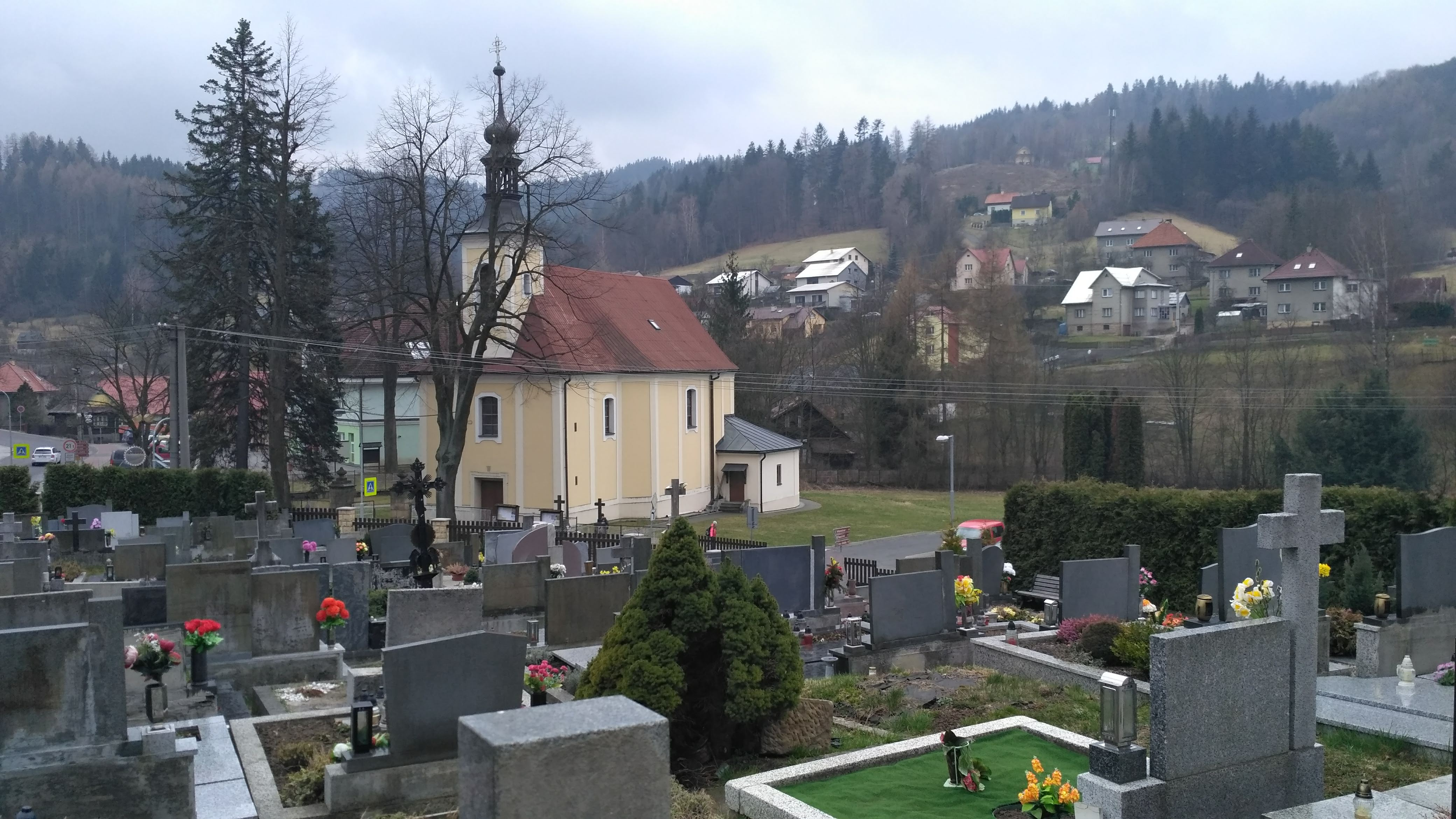
- Church of the Assumption of the Virgin Mary

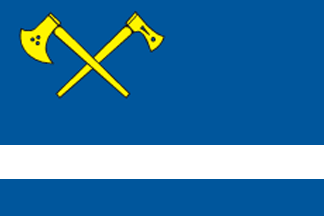
- Flag Coat of arms

- Location in the Czech Republic
- Coordinates: 49°24′54″N 18°6′35″E
- Country: Czech Republic
- Region: Zlín
- District: Vsetín
- First mentioned: 1651

Area
  - Total: 35.95 km^{2} (13.88 sq mi)
- Elevation: 465 m (1,526 ft)

Population (2026-01-01)
  - Total: 2,197
  - Density: 61.11/km^{2} (158.3/sq mi)
- Time zone: UTC+1 (CET)
  - Summer (DST): UTC+2 (CEST)
- Postal code: 756 27
- Website: www.valasskabystrice.cz

Valašská Bystřice is a municipality and village in Vsetín District in the Zlín Region of the Czech Republic. It has about 2,200 inhabitants.

== Etymology ==
The name Bystřice is derived from the watercourse that flows through the village (originally called Bystřice, but today called Bystřička – diminutive form of Bystřice). The oldest name of the village was Randýskova Bystřice ('Randýsek's Bystřice'), after its first Vogt. Later it was called Nový Bystřice ('new Bystřice'), Hrubá Bystřice ('rough Bystřice') and from the 18th century Velká Bystřice ('great Bystřice'). In 1925, the municipality was renamed Valašská Bystřice ('Moravian Wallachian Bystřice').

== Geography ==
Valašská Bystřice is located about 12 kilometres (7 mi) northeast of Vsetín and 37 km (23 mi) northeast of Zlín. It lies in the Hostýn-Vsetín Mountains. The highest point is the Tanečnice mountain at 912 m (2,992 ft) above sea level. The Bystřička Stream flows through the municipality. The whole territory of Valašská Bystřice lies in the Beskydy Protected Landscape Area.

== History ==
The first written mention of Bystřice is from 1651. It was originally a scattered settlement of forest workers. In 1766, a border guard station was established here.

== Demographics ==
Historical population

Year	Pop.	±%
1869	1,881	—
1880	1,979	+5.2%
1890	2,045	+3.3%
1900	2,090	+2.2%
1910	2,114	+1.1%

Year	Pop.	±%
1921	2,047	−3.2%
1930	2,029	−0.9%
1950	1,743	−14.1%
1961	2,339	+34.2%
1970	2,217	−5.2%

Year	Pop.	±%
1980	2,079	−6.2%
1991	2,134	+2.6%
2001	2,182	+2.2%
2011	2,239	+2.6%
2021	2,161	−3.5%

Source: Censuses

== Transport ==
There are no railways or major roads passing through the municipality.

== Sights ==
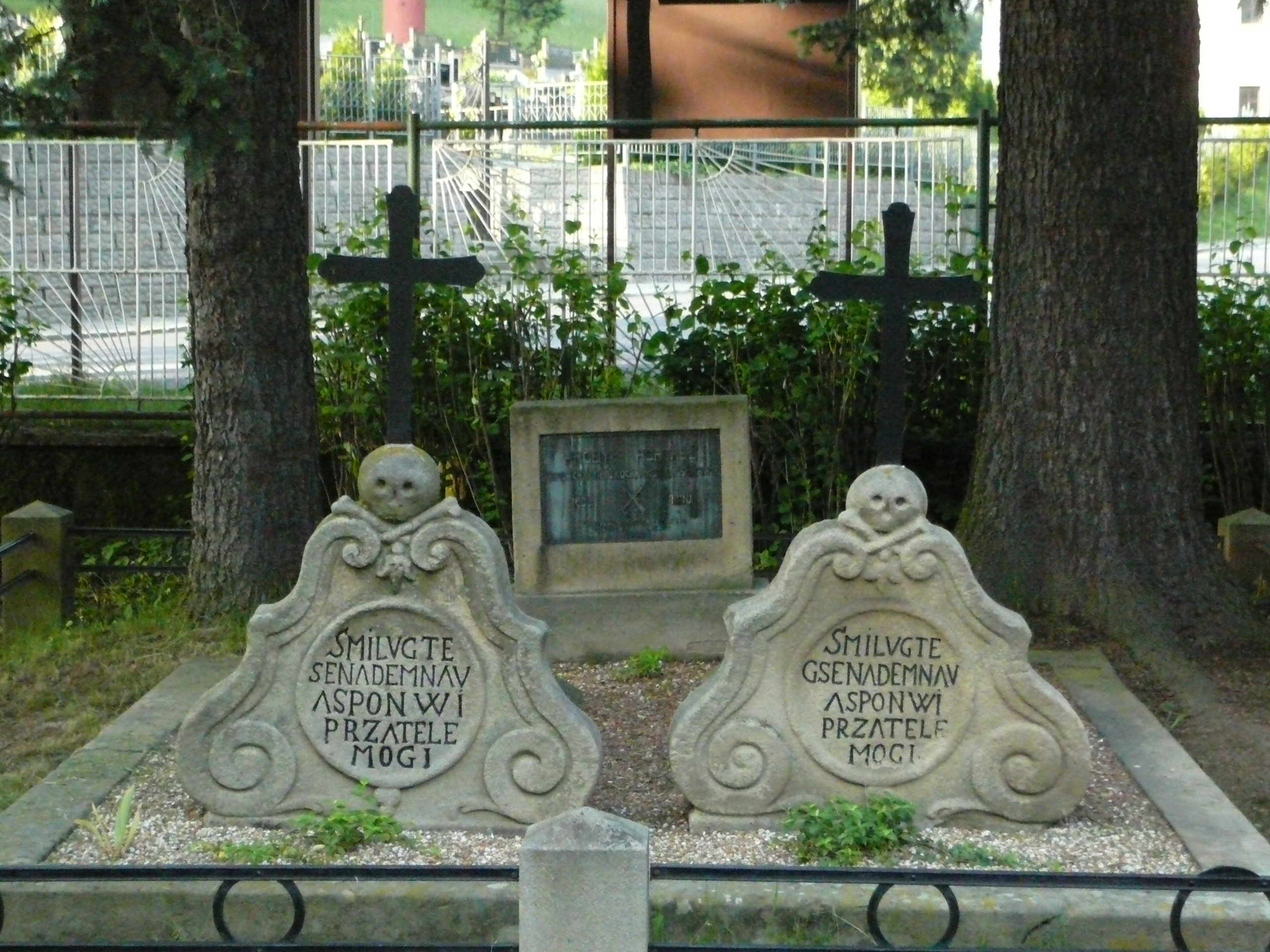
Tombstones of border guards

The only protected cultural monument is a pair of tombstones of border guards from the end of the 18th century. The main landmark of Valašská Bystřice is the Church of the Assumption of the Virgin Mary. It was built in the Baroque style in 1772–1778.
