= Bystřice pod Lopeníkem =

- Municipality
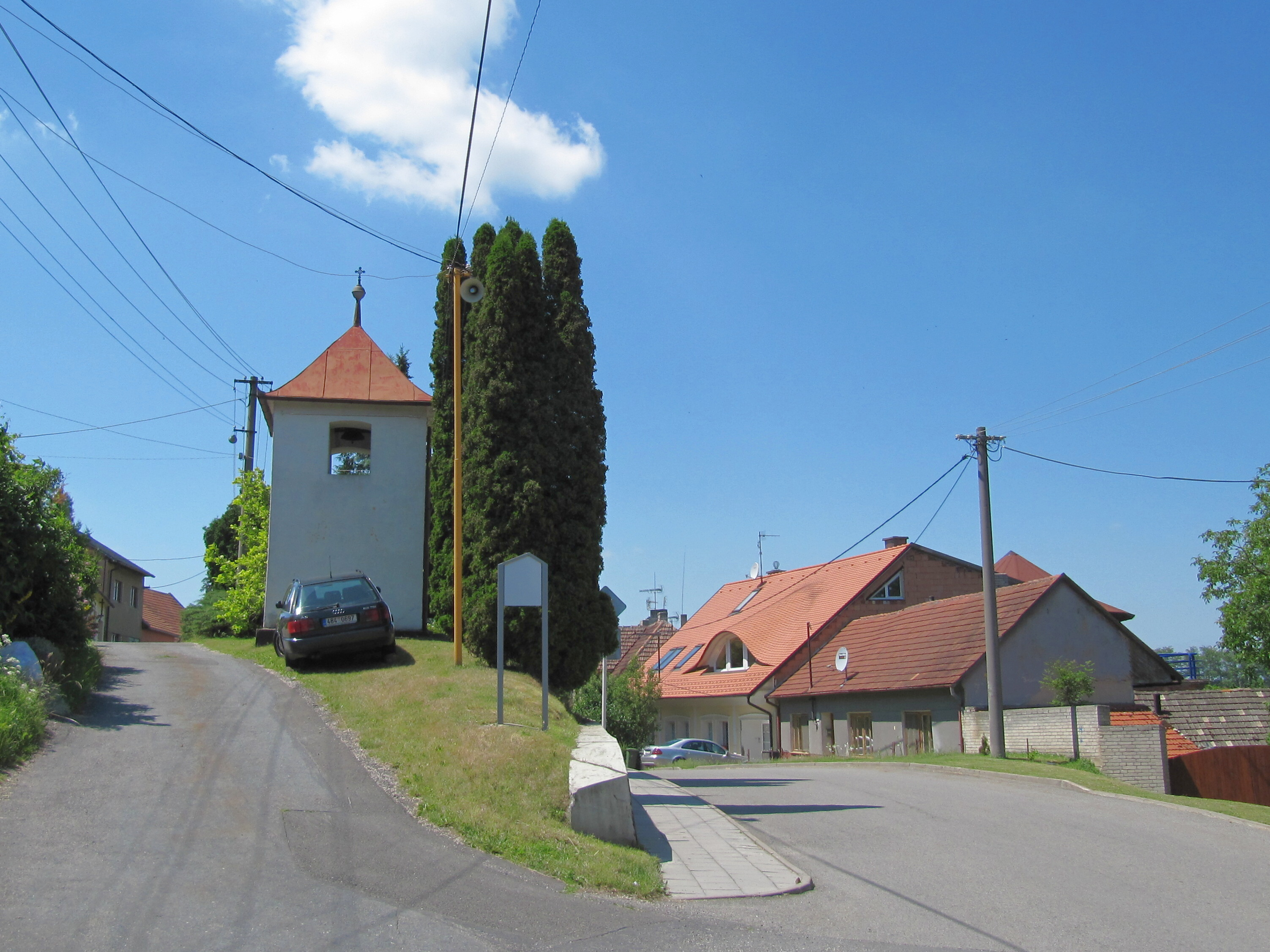
- Belfry

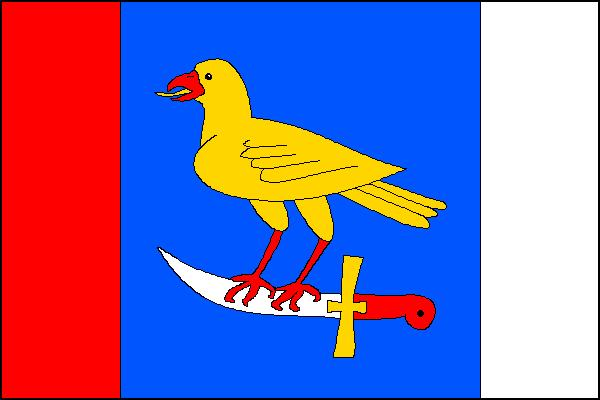
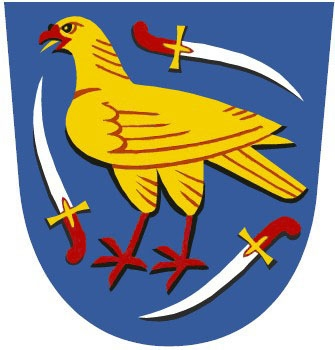
- Flag Coat of arms

- Location in the Czech Republic
- Coordinates: 48°58′29″N 17°45′51″E
- Country: Czech Republic
- Region: Zlín
- District: Uherské Hradiště
- First mentioned: 1405

Area
  - Total: 13.43 km^{2} (5.19 sq mi)
- Elevation: 365 m (1,198 ft)

Population (2026-01-01)
  - Total: 857
  - Density: 63.8/km^{2} (165/sq mi)
- Time zone: UTC+1 (CET)
  - Summer (DST): UTC+2 (CEST)
- Postal code: 687 55
- Website: www.bystricepodlopenikem.cz

Bystřice pod Lopeníkem is a municipality and village in Uherské Hradiště District in the Zlín Region of the Czech Republic. It has about 900 inhabitants.

Bystřice pod Lopeníkem lies approximately 26 kilometres (16 mi) south-east of Uherské Hradiště, 31 km (19 mi) south of Zlín, and 272 km (169 mi) south-east of Prague.

== Demographics ==
Historical population
Year	Pop.	±%
1869	739	—
1880	821	+11.1%
1890	850	+3.5%
1900	934	+9.9%
1910	914	−2.1%
1921	1,008	+10.3%
1930	915	−9.2%
1950	962	+5.1%
1961	1,260	+31.0%
1970	1,152	−8.6%
1980	1,013	−12.1%
1991	872	−13.9%
2001	800	−8.3%
2011	747	−6.6%
2021	786	+5.2%
Source: Censuses
