= Považský hrad =

Castle in Slovakia

- Bystrický hrad
- Považská Bystrica, Trenčín Region
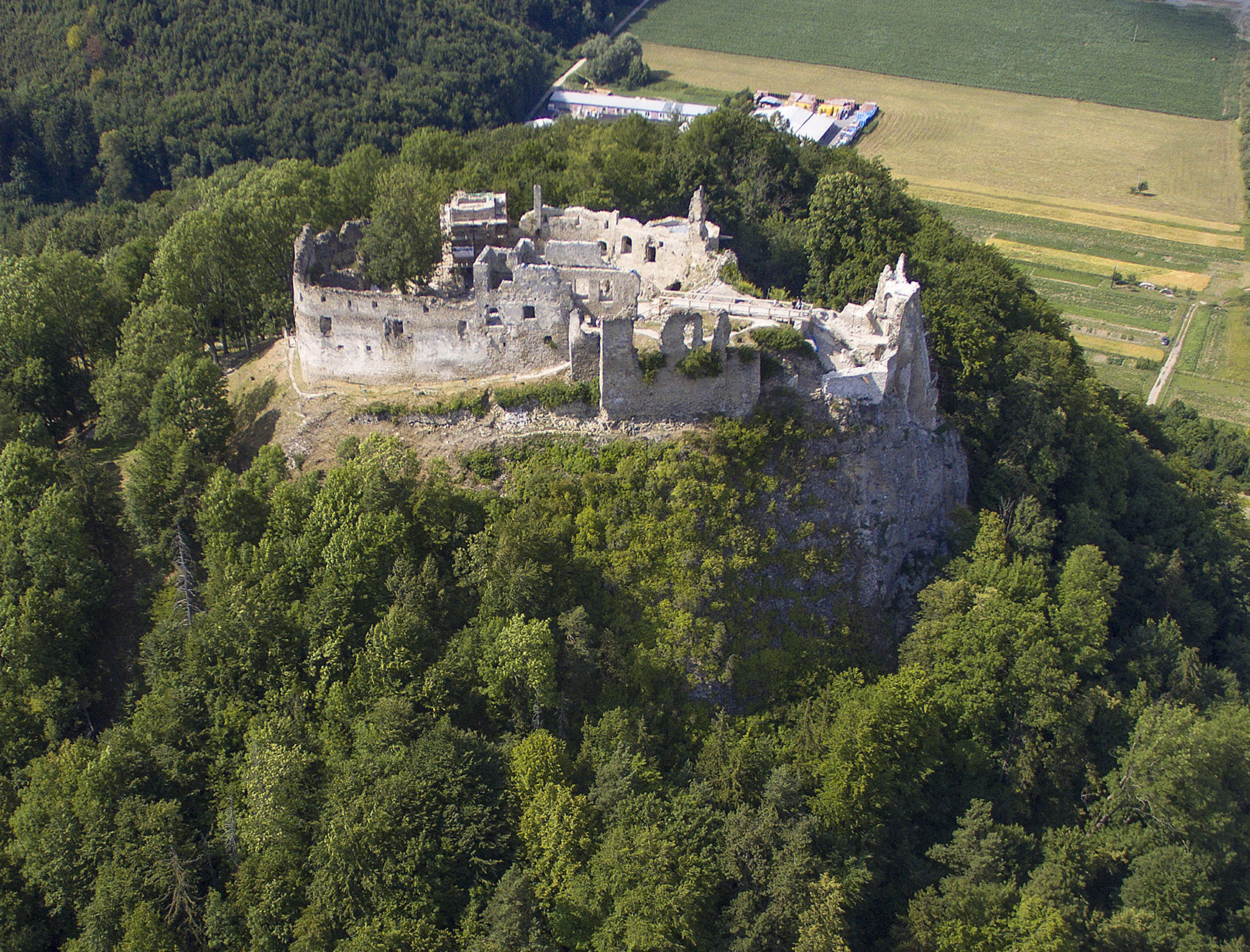
- Castle Považský hrad

Site information
- Type: castle ruins

Site history
- Built: 1128 / 1316 (first written reference)
- Materials: Sandstone & limestone

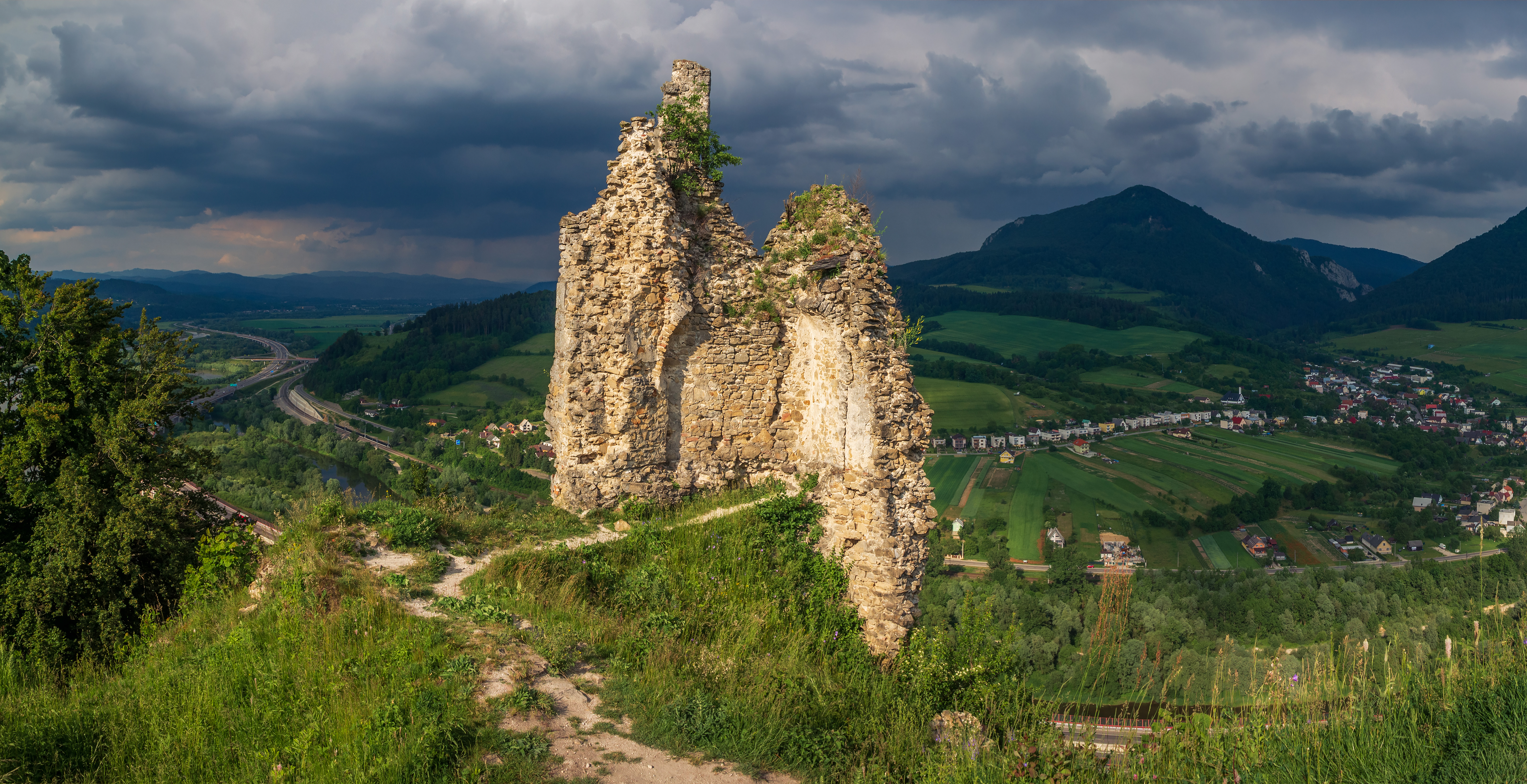
View from the east

View from the castle

Považský hrad (other names: Hrad Bystrica, Bystrický hrad, Vágbeszterce vára, Waagburg, Bistrizza, Bestruche castrum) is a ruin of medieval castle on the right side of the river Váh, near Považská Bystrica in Slovakia. It is thought to be the essential part of silhouette of Považie and Upper Váh region especially. It is built on a cliff 497 meters above sea level. It was one of the most important castles guarding the valley of the river Váh. At the peak of its fame it was home of around 400 people. It is famously known as an "eagles nest" of the important Hungarian noble family of the Podmanitzky.

== History ==
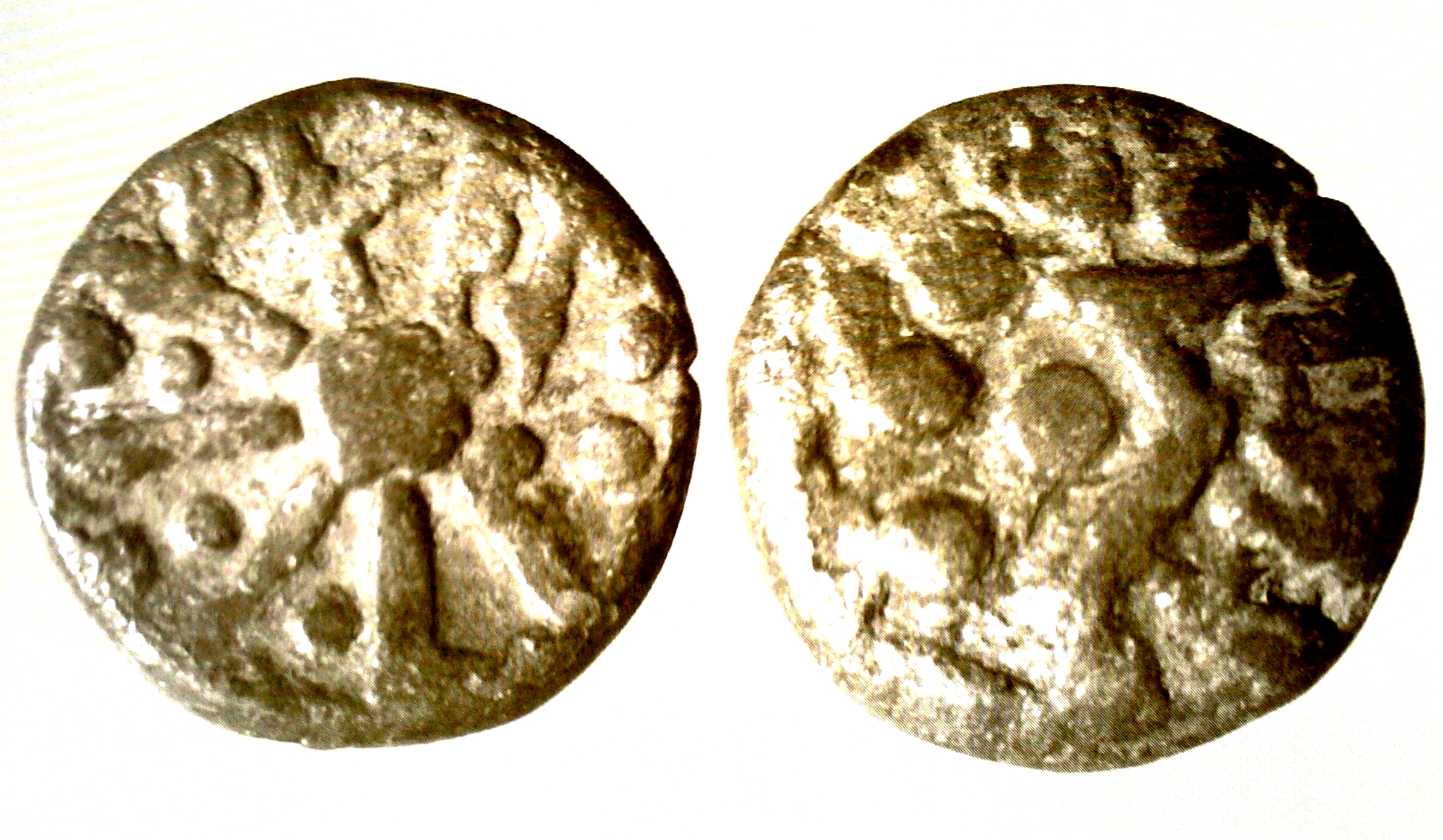
Coins found on the castle cliff, dated to the first century BC

The first settlement of the castle cliff is dated to Púchov culture, also a Celtic coin was found on the hill. The exact year of establishment of the Bistrizza castle is not known, but it is assumed that it might have been around 1128 AD. There are doubts that the castle in those times might have been made of wood because of the presence of two other wooden castles in present-day Slovakia. For the shift from wooden castle is probably responsible Béla IV, after the invasions of Batu Khan. However, the first written reference is from 1316, closely connected to Matthew III Csák. The next holder of the castle was county judge Alexander Köcski. Together with his son Miklós, they ruled from 1325 to 1354. From 1354 the castle belonged to Pál Ugali, chancellor of ex-county judge. During last few years of the 14th century, King Sigismund gave the fortress to palatine Sudivoj, but the owner was quickly changed, and from 1400 to 1425 it belonged to Stibor of Stiboricz. Then it became the possession of a king. In 1458 Matthias Corvinus of Hungary donated the castle, the town and 16 surrounding villages to László Podmanitzky of the Podmanitzky for his devotion to him, preceded by violent death of his father Antal Podmanitzky in the service of the king. His diligent work for the ruler prepared a good position for his sons and great upsurge of his possession.

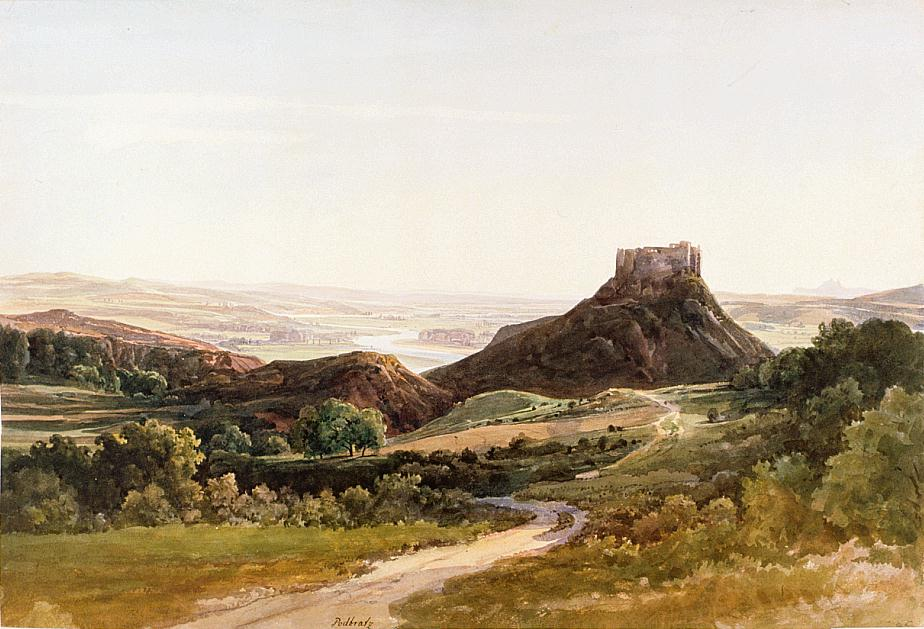
Castle by Thomas Entner

His sons had important roles in the future of middle Europe. Jan Podmaniczky became the Archbishop of Zagreb and personal mentor of Vladislaus II. His brother Stefan Podmanitzky became Archbishop of Nitra, he crowned both János Szapolyai and Ferdinand I as the kings of the country, but later he took the Habsburgs' side due to their stretching influence around Nitra. He was one of the leaders of the Counter-Reformation in the times when Martin Luther's influence just started to reach the country. His third son Mihály Podmanitzky became chamberlain of King Louis II. He with his brother Stefan participated in the Battle of Mohács, from which he never returned. He left three daughters and sons Jan and Rafael.

After the Battle of Mohács in 1526, the country was divided between two kings, János Szapolyai and Ferdinand I.

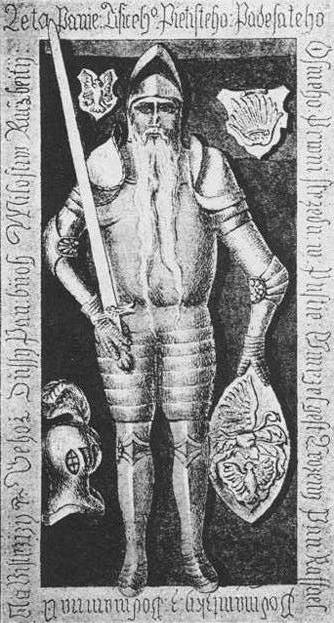
Gravestone of Rafael Podmanitzky from 1558

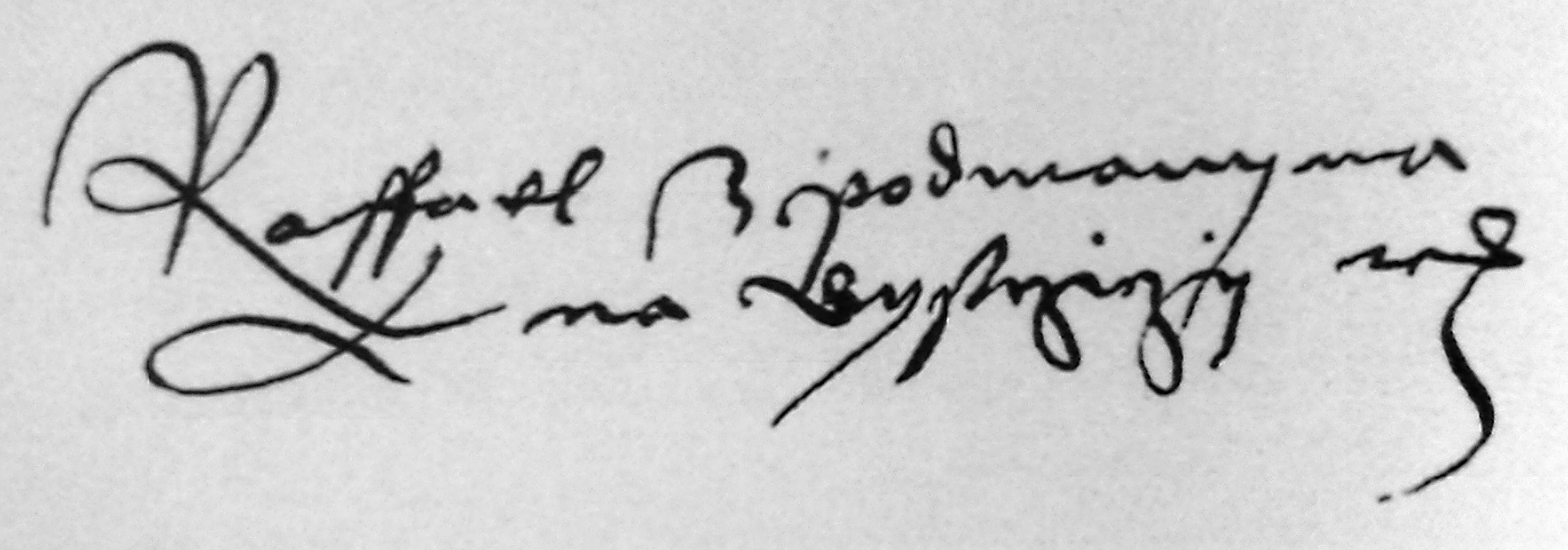
Signature of Rafael Podmanitzky

This dispute used János Podmanitzky and his brother Rafael Podmanitzky to gain power in the region; Považský hrad was the centre of their influence. They took the side of János Szapolyai although most of the region was under control of the Habsburgs. Possession of Podmanitzky, with a hard centre Považský hrad withstood attacks of king's army led by Katzainer, to whom Trenčín gave up in the summer of 1528, but they even gained new possessions around Lednica. They were famous for their successful raids all around the region. In those times they were limitless rulers of the region; the whole northern part of the county, under their reign, was independent from the rest of the county controlled by Ferdinand I. In the 1530s they became involved in the fight against Protestant family Kostka. For their involvement they were given the manor of Veszprém. They split up in 1537 to create their own manors, leaving Rafael in the region and Jan creating Vesprim manor, but they both still continued with their raids. In 1542 their raids were issued on the king's court. After settling down the possession matters with Kostka, they accepted the results. A great fire started in 1543 which devastated the castle but his owner invested great effort to rebuilding it. After the great burn out of his "eagle's nest" Rafael did not feel safe, so he made an agreement with Habsburgs. Probably the best characterization of Raffael was by József Kocsis, author of several books about castles in Slovakia," Raffael Podmanitzky was no worse but no better than the others living in those times. He was only much stronger." After his conversion he fully dedicated his time to his manor. His loyalty was approved when he was named governor of the northern part of Trencsén County region. The end of their rule came with his death in 1558. His gravestone is still placed in Považská Bystrica.

In the grave of Rafael a silver club was discovered from which a chalice was made. This was (in 1901) still in possession of the church. The chalice has the following inscription: "ARCUM SZUCSA SOLIS AEQUARI CURAVIT FERDINANDUS L 1528". The marble monument of Rafael Podmanitzky in Považská Bystrica is of interest because it has an inscription all around in old Slovak language it says "LETA PANIE TISICEHO PIETISTEHO PADESATEHO OSMEHO PRWNI STRZEDU W PUSTIE UMRZEL GEST UROZENY PAN RAFFAEL PODMANITZKY Z PODMANINA JEHOZ DUSSY PAN BUOH MILOSTIW RACZ BIETI". The monument is on the right side wall of the Roman Catholic Church not far from the "Galerie". It depicts a very tall man in full armor. The facial features are clearly chiseled in the stone.

In 1560 the castle was donated to Gáspár Szerédi. After his death his wife married András Balassa. The castle was shelter for the Balassa family during an uprising of Francis II Rákóczi against the Habsburgs. The castle, due to its well-built fort, resisted. Because of a lack of luxury, the Balassa family moved from the castle to the mansion below the castle cliff. The place was then used during the rebellion against Leopold I, so to prevent more rebellion the emperor ordered the castle to be destroyed. It was burned by his troops in 1698. This might be the reason of lack of documentation for the establishment of the castle. A great earthquake came at 8:00 pm on 15 February 1858 AD. During this night a tower of castle's prison fell. From this moment the castle was left of peoples interest until it was bought in 2007 by Považská Bystrica and voluntary organization "Zdruzenie na zachranu Povazskeho hradu " did not start essential reparations on it.

== Building ==
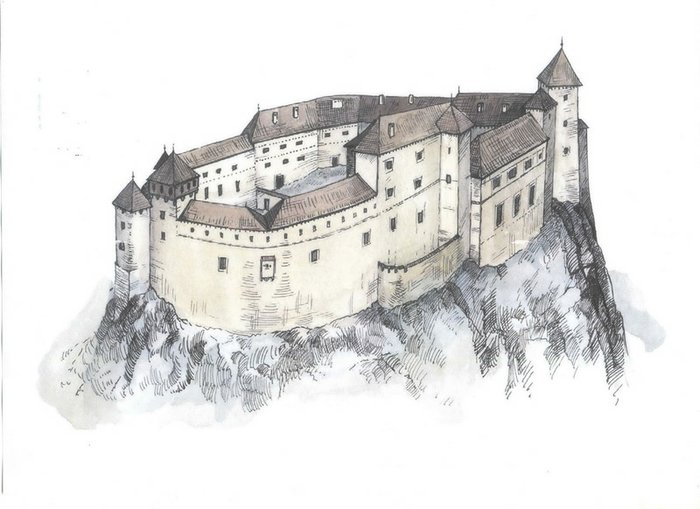
Sketch of the castle at the peak of his fame

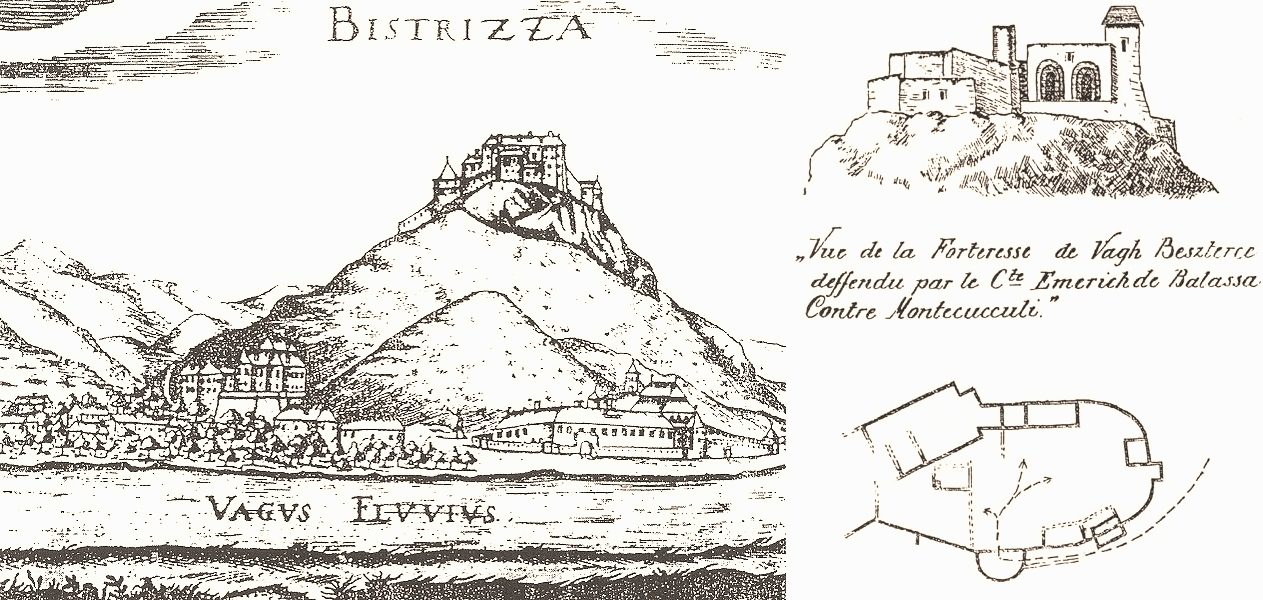
Steel engraving of the castle 1676 AD and ground plan

The castle with shingle roof belonged in times of his fame to one of biggest well-fortified buildings of that kind. The ground plan of the building has a fid shape. The entrance to the castle was protected by an entrance tower, a barbican and two bastions, parts of a strong wall through which the castle crew protected themselves in case of danger. The ground floor of the tower was used as a storage place for munitions. Here was probably also a secret gate through which people from the castle were supplied in cases of attack, when the main entrance was built-in. On the northern side there was a cuboid tower, used as a prison. On the east of the tower there was a main gate for carriages. A few metres ahead was a warehouse of cannons, next to them houses of nobles and a chapel. These parts are nowadays most devastated. On the southwest there were flats, and under them other warehouses, granary, kitchens and pantries. The castle had three floors. The water supply was ensured by underground wooden pipes from the well Sklepita. The remains of these pipes were found in the early 20th century. In front of the castle was a moat. Sandstone and limestone were used as building materials.

== Location ==
=== Past ===
The castle was built on the cliff above Považské Podhradie. His main function was to protect the valley of the river Váh, important water route and to protect border of the country.

=== Present ===
Underneath the castle two important routes in Slovakia meet. It is the motorway D1 and branch A of fifth corridor of Pan-European railway corridor.

== Organisation ==
An organisation called " Zdruzenie na zachranu Povazskeho hradu " was established in 2008 to protect the county's heritage from being destroyed. It collects money for repair of the castle and organises repair workshops on the castle. However, there are still problems with financing of the repairs. Every first day of a year, a new year's walk to the castle is organised.

== Art ==
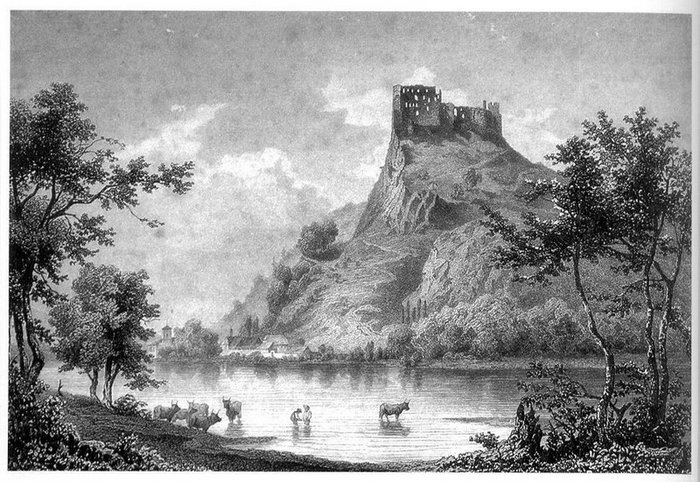
Steel-engraving of the castle, L. Rohbock

The castle has appeared in many pictures, including works of well-known Slovak author Imro Weiner-Kráľ, German author Ludwig Rohbock or Gaspar Bouttats. In written form in " Malebna cesta dolu Vahom ", from Alojz Mednansky. The castle was, with its famous rulers Ladislav & Rafael Podmanitzky, often the theme of legends and narratives.

== Vandalism ==
In spite of the great effort of people for whom the destiny of the country's heritage is not vacant, there are still several cases of vandalism on the castle. That is why the castle lacks an information board and places for rest during the walk to the castle.

== Vicinity ==
=== Burg ===
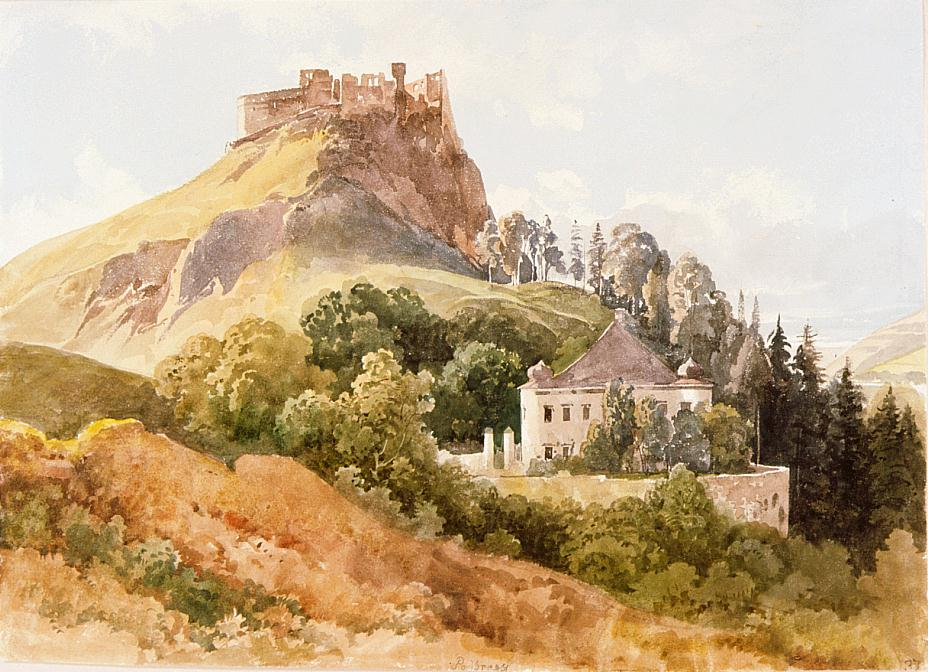
Painting by Thomas Ender Burg in the foreground, castle in the background

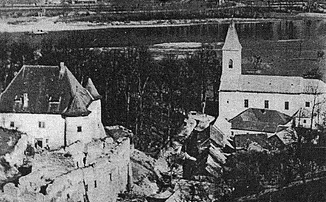
Burg and The Church in 1929

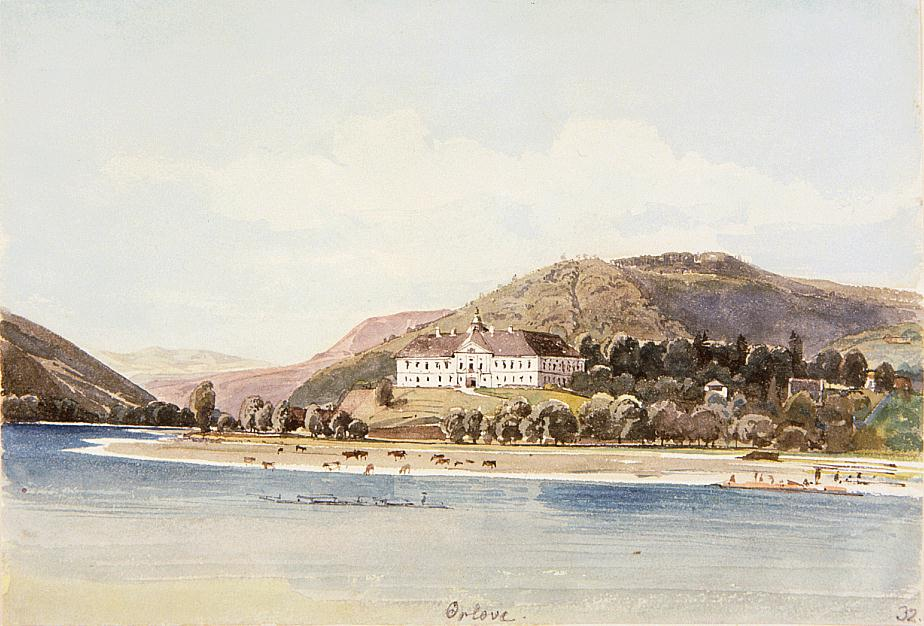
Orlove Manor by Thomas Ender

Underneath the castle, on the south, there is a Renaissance manor house called Burg. Order to build the manor was given by Zsigmond Balassa. Building works on the manor started in the first third of the 17th century and were finished 1631, when family moved from Castle. Last owner was Baroness Popper von Podhragy, who supported reconstruction of the manor until after the World War I in 1919 it became possession of the state. Later it was bought by private company.

=== Lower Manor ===
Few meters away, on the east, lower, there is Rococo manor called Szapáry Castle, built in 1676 probably by Péter Szapáry. In the interior of the manor was a chapel and school used by common people from neighbourhood. Nowadays manor is left to dilapilate. In the vicinity of the manors was a cemetery with gravestones of Balassa family and garden with plants brought from around the world. Nowadays there are few remnants of the past fame of these manors.

=== Church of Saint Ladislaus ===
Next to the lower manor lies the Church of Saint Ladislaus, built in 1843. Building works lasted for 18 years. A fire gutted the church in 1888, but it was renewed in 1929. In the premises of the church is statue of Saint John of Nepomuk, which was coincidentally brought to Považské Podhradie on abandoned flatboat during floods in 1784. After the floods the statue was placed on the place of its founding with five lindens around. However, after some time lindens grew together forming one massive linden-tree. From this point people started to idolize the linden with the statue as a wonder of nature until the linden was cut down during the building of new man-made basin of the Váh River.

=== Church of the Visitation of the Virgin Mary ===
Three kilometres away in the town's centre was a Gothic Church of the Visitation of the Virgin Mary. It was built in the 14th century by Jan Podmanitzky. It was rebuilt in 1940 to satisfy the need for capacity, leaving only presbytery, tower and the northern part of the walls of the old church. Nowadays paned windows were designed by Slovak artists Vincent and Viera Hloznik. In the entrance hall of the church is the gravestone of Rafael Podmaitzky, Zsigmond Balassa and his wife Alżbeta Zborowska.

=== Manor Orlove ===
Another Renaissance mansion lies few kilometres away, but still in the municipality of Považská Bystrica in Orlove. It was again built by Zsigmond Balassa in 1612, but because of the fire in 1618 it was rebuilt in 1733 in the Baroque style.

=== Manínska tiesňava ===
On the opposite bank of the Váh River, there lies narrowest canyon in Slovakia called Manínska tiesňava.
