= Manor Povazske Podhradie =

Szapáry Castle
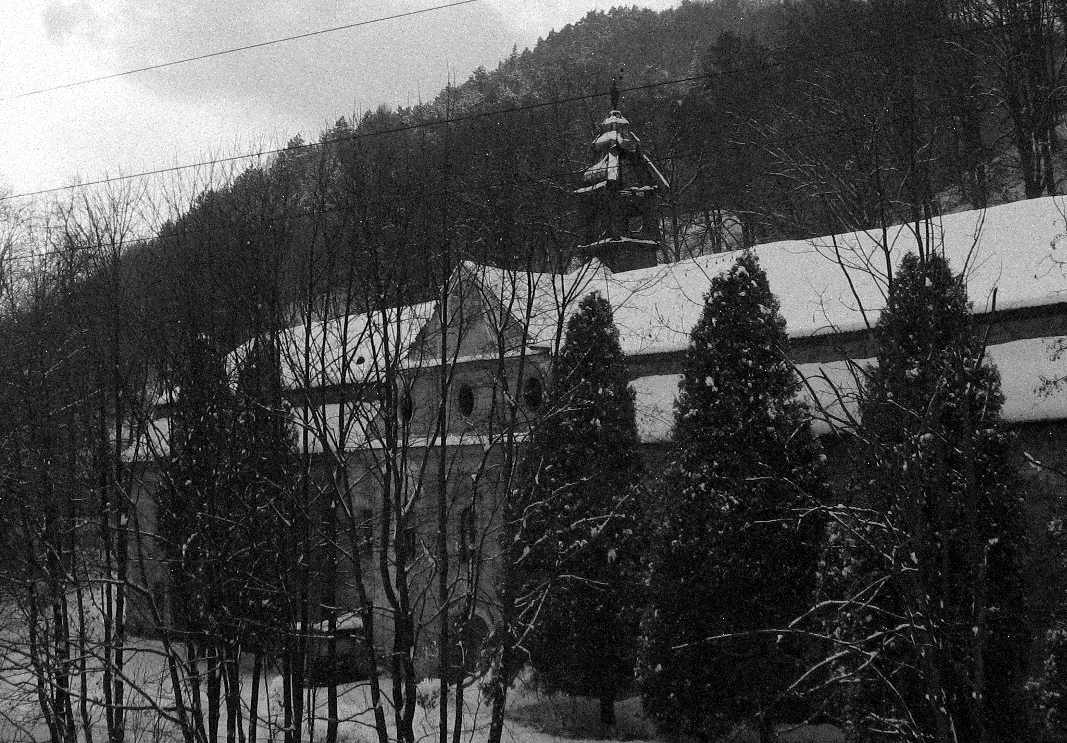
- Manor house in 2010.
- Interactive map of the Szapáry Castle area

General information
- Type: Manor-house
- Location: 49.14400°N 18.46080°E, Slovakia
- Opened: 1676

Szapáry Castle is a manor house on the east, lower from Burg and below the castle Považský hrad in Považská Bystrica municipality. Built was in 1676 probably by the Hungarian nobleman Péter Szapáry. In the interior of the manor was a chapel and school used by common people from the neighbourhood. Nowadays manor is left to dilapilate. In the vicinity of the manors was a cemetery with gravestones of the Hungarian Balassa noble family and garden with plants brought from around the world. In 1918 people driven by anger for the year under villeinage looted the manor. They burned books, destroyed everything that they found.

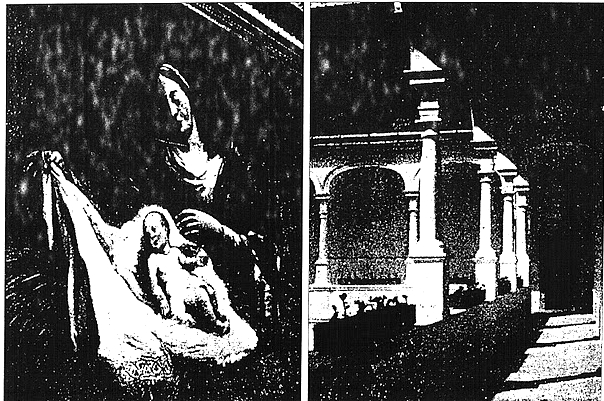
Photo of Szapáry Manor a painting by Mildorfer

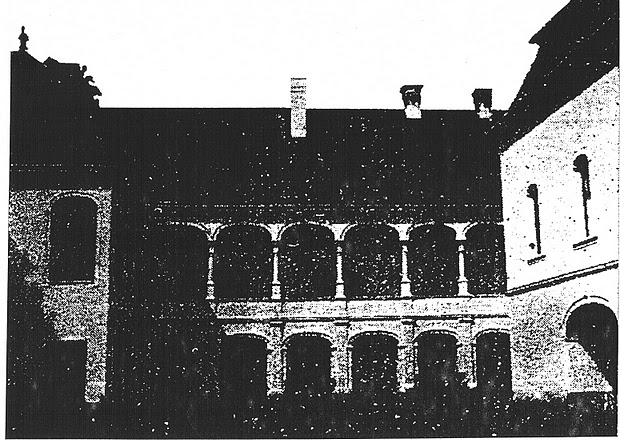
Manor in 1775

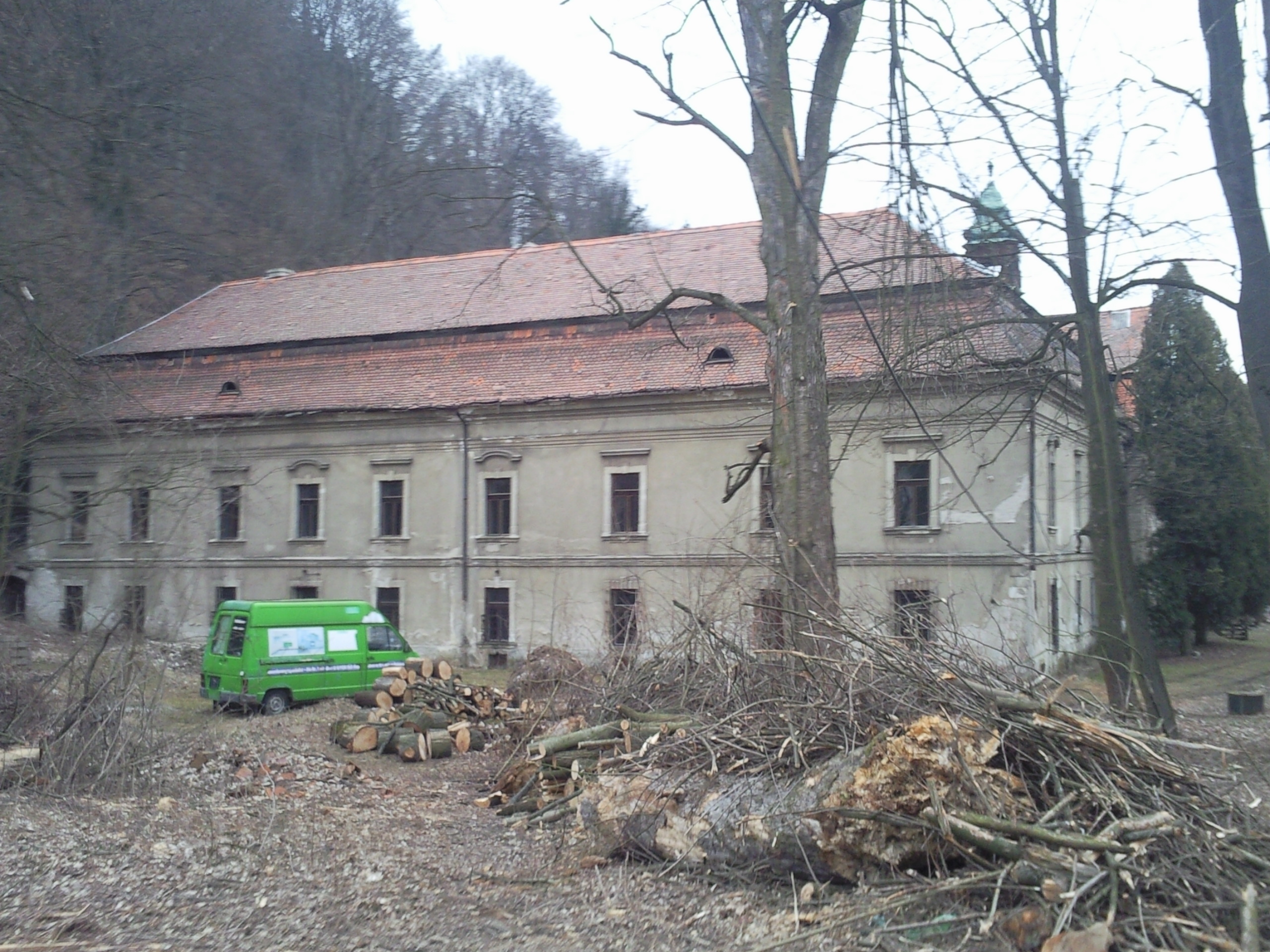
Present

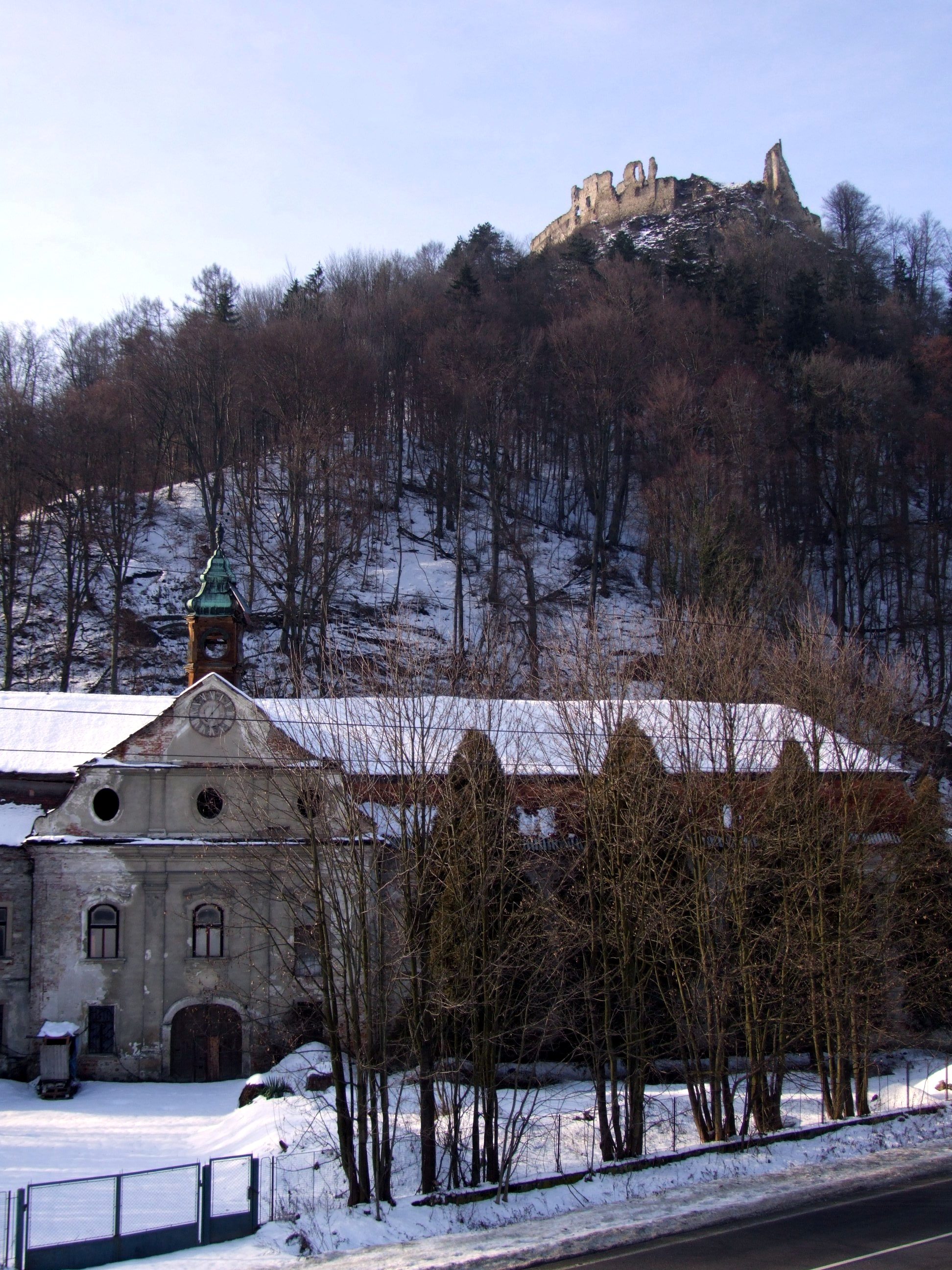
Manor-house and Považský hrad
