= Horné Strháre =

Horné Strháre Felsőesztergály
- Municipality
- Flag

- Location of Horné Strháre in the Banská Bystrica Region Location of Horné Strháre in Slovakia
- Coordinates: 48.27°N 19.37°E
- Country: Slovakia
- Region: Banská Bystrica Region
- District: Veľký Krtíš District
- First mentioned: 1243

Area
  - Total: 12.76 km^{2} (4.93 sq mi)
- Elevation: 244 m (801 ft)

Population (2025)
  - Total: 257
- Time zone: UTC+1 (CET)
  - Summer (DST): UTC+2 (CEST)
- Postal code: 991 04
- Area code: +421 47
- Vehicle registration plate (until 2022): VK
- Website: www.hornestrhare.sk

Horné Strháre (Hungarian: Felsőesztergály) is a village and municipality in the Veľký Krtíš District of the Banská Bystrica Region of southern Slovakia.

== Geography ==
The municipality lies at an altitude of 244 metres (801 ft) and covers an area of 12.76 km^{2} (4.93 sq mi) (2025).

== History ==
In historical records the village was first mentioned in 1243 (Eztergur, Vzturgar), when it belonged to Hont Castle. After, it passed to Lords Kacsics and, in 1327, to Szécsényi. From 1554 to 1594 it was occupied by Turks. In the 17th century it belonged to Divín (Zichy) and Modrý Kameň (Balassa)

== Population ==
Population statistic (10 years)
Year	1995	2005	2015	2025
Count	201	235	243	257
Difference		+16.91%	+3.40%	+5.76%

Population statistic
Year	2024	2025
Count	253	257
Difference		+1.58%

It has a population of 257 people (31 December 2025).

=== Ethnicity ===
Census 2021 (1+ %)
Ethnicity	Number	Fraction
Slovak	245	96.45%
Not found out	5	1.96%
Hungarian	4	1.57%
Total	254	

In year 2021 was 254 people by ethnicity 245 as Slovak, 5 as Not found out, 4 as Hungarian, 1 as Polish and 1 as Other.

Note on population: The difference values of population numbers in the table "Population statistic" and in the sections "Ethnicity" & "Religion" is caused by the use of various statistical methods.

=== Religion ===
Census 2021 (1+ %)
Religion	Number	Fraction
Roman Catholic Church	123	48.43%
Evangelical Church	93	36.61%
None	32	12.6%
Not found out	5	1.97%
Total	254	

In year 2021 was 254 people by religion 123 from Roman Catholic Church, 93 from Evangelical Church, 32 from None, 5 from Not found out and 1 from Christian Congregations in Slovakia.

== Genealogical resources ==
The records for genealogical research are available at the state archive "Statny Archiv in Banska Bystrica, Slovakia"

- Roman Catholic church records (births/marriages/deaths): 1754-1896 (parish B)
- Lutheran church records (births/marriages/deaths): 1786-1836 (parish B)

== See also ==
- List of municipalities and towns in Slovakia
