= Chrťany =

Chrťany Hartyán
- Municipality
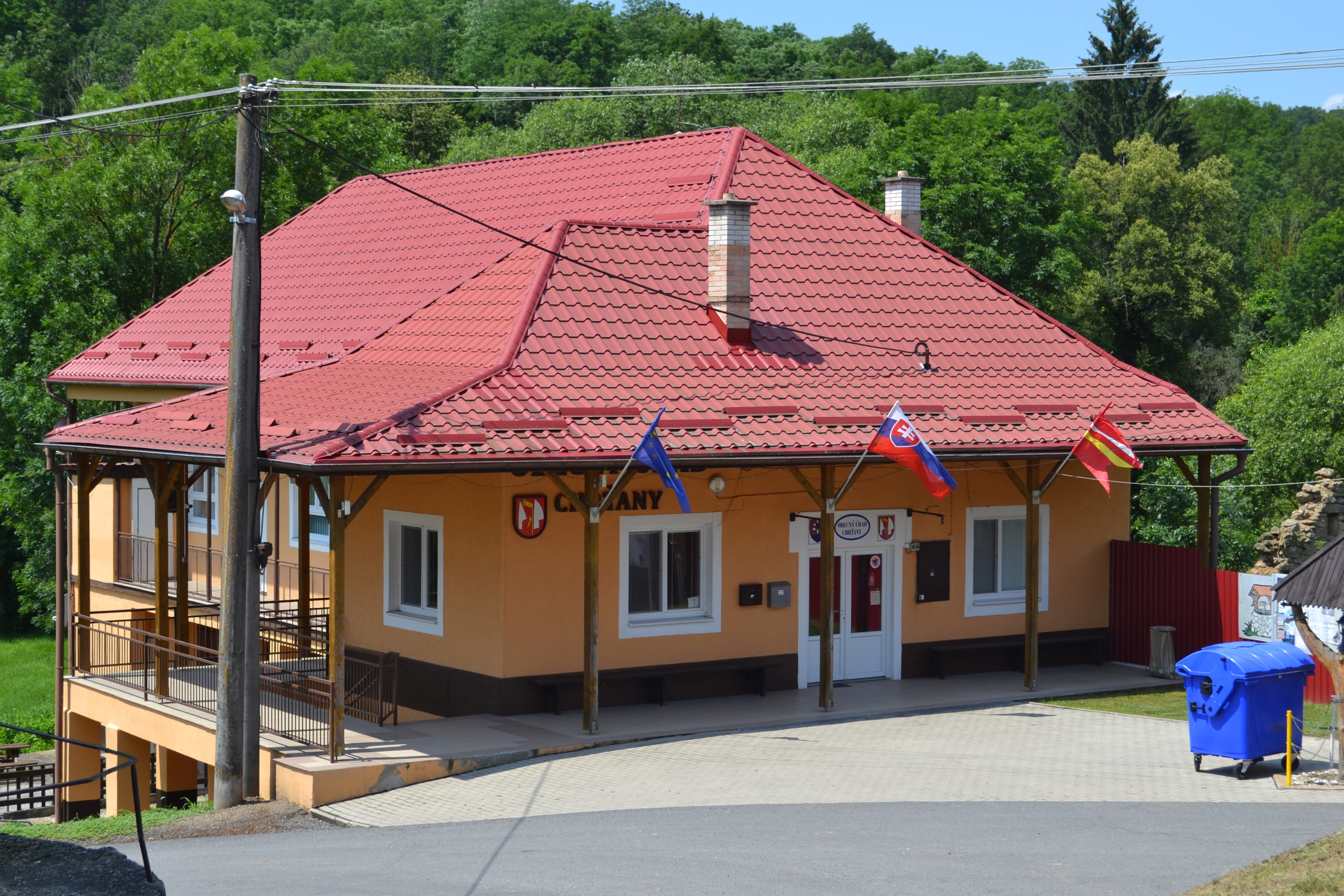

- Flag

- Location of Chrťany in the Banská Bystrica Region Location of Chrťany in Slovakia
- Coordinates: 48.30°N 19.47°E
- Country: Slovakia
- Region: Banská Bystrica Region
- District: Veľký Krtíš District
- First mentioned: 1227

Area
  - Total: 9.18 km^{2} (3.54 sq mi)
- Elevation: 222 m (728 ft)

Population (2025)
  - Total: 118
- Time zone: UTC+1 (CET)
  - Summer (DST): UTC+2 (CEST)
- Postal code: 991 21
- Area code: +421 47
- Vehicle registration plate (until 2022): VK
- Website: www.obecchrtany.sk

Chrťany (Hungarian: Hartyán, until 1899: Tót-Hartyán) is a village and municipality in the Veľký Krtíš District of the Banská Bystrica Region of southern Slovakia.

== Geography ==
The municipality lies at an altitude of 222 metres (728 ft) and covers an area of 9.18 km^{2} (3.54 sq mi) (2025).

== History ==
In historical records, the village was first mentioned in 1227 (1227 Harkyan, 1339 Harakyan, 1349 Harkyan). During its History, it belonged to many noble families (Aba, Szecsény, Balassa). From 1554 to 1594 it was occupied by Turks. Successively it belonged to Divín and Modrý Kameň.

== Population ==
Population statistic (10 years)
Year	1995	2005	2015	2025
Count	112	140	154	118
Difference		+25%	+10%	−23.37%

Population statistic
Year	2024	2025
Count	120	118
Difference		−1.66%

It has a population of 118 people (31 December 2025).

=== Ethnicity ===
Census 2021 (1+ %)
Ethnicity	Number	Fraction
Slovak	106	99.06%
Romani	2	1.86%
Hungarian	2	1.86%
Total	107	

In year 2021 was 107 people by ethnicity 106 as Slovak, 2 as Romani, 2 as Hungarian and 1 as French.

Note on population: The difference values of population numbers in the table "Population statistic" and in the sections "Ethnicity" & "Religion" is caused by the use of various statistical methods.

=== Religion ===
Census 2021 (1+ %)
Religion	Number	Fraction
Evangelical Church	48	44.86%
Roman Catholic Church	31	28.97%
None	28	26.17%
Total	107	

In year 2021 was 107 people by religion 48 from Evangelical Church, 31 from Roman Catholic Church and 28 from None.

== Genealogical resources ==
The records for genealogical research are available at the state archive "Statny Archiv in Banska Bystrica, Slovakia"

- Roman Catholic church records (births/marriages/deaths): 1811-1899 (parish B)
- Lutheran church records (births/marriages/deaths): 1785-1898 (parish B)

== See also ==
- List of municipalities and towns in Slovakia
