= Dačov Lom =

Dačov Lom Dacsólám
- Municipality
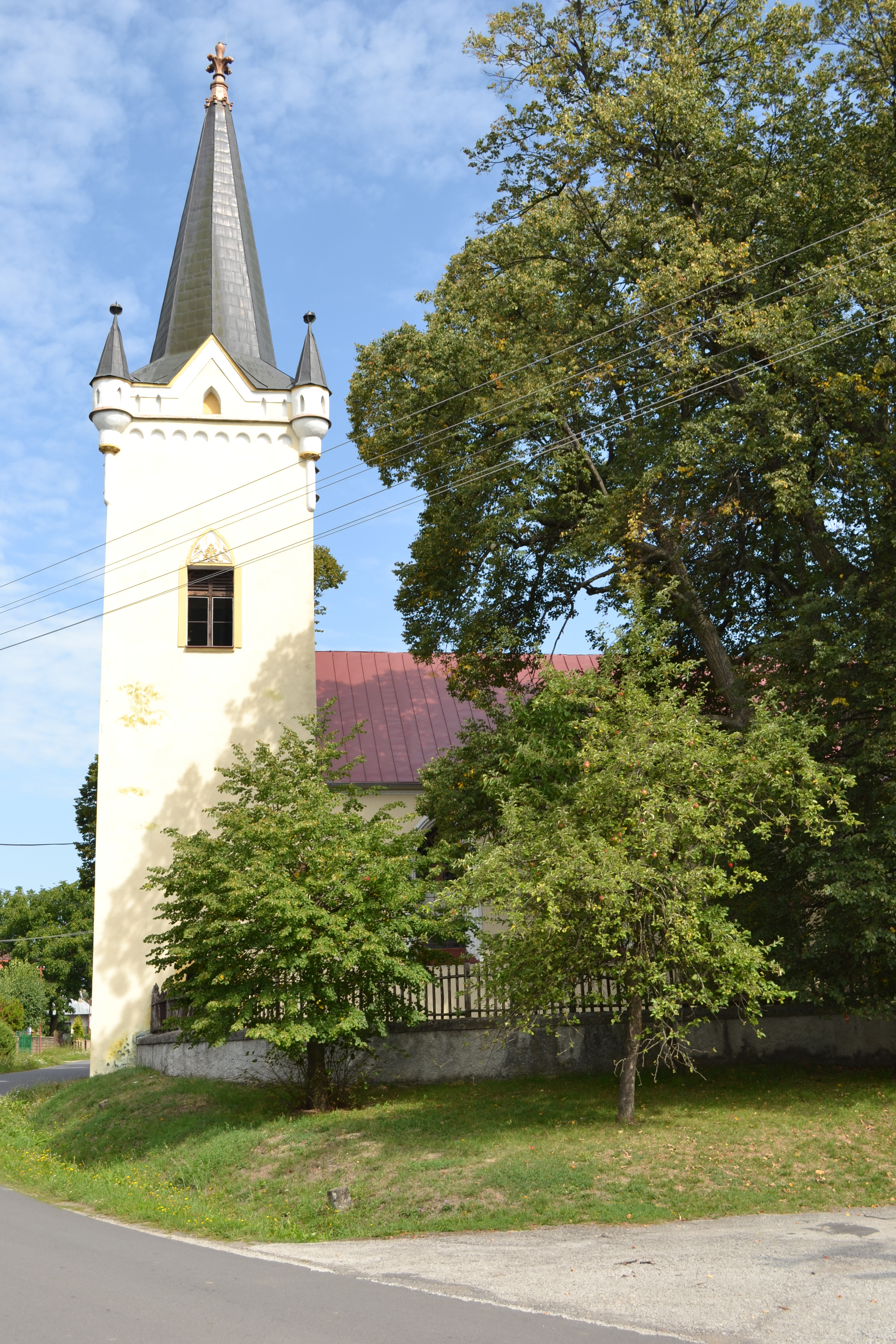

- Flag

- Location of Dačov Lom in the Banská Bystrica Region Location of Dačov Lom in Slovakia
- Coordinates: 48.32°N 19.27°E
- Country: Slovakia
- Region: Banská Bystrica Region
- District: Veľký Krtíš District
- First mentioned: 1333

Area
  - Total: 24.54 km^{2} (9.47 sq mi)
- Elevation: 488 m (1,601 ft)

Population (2025)
  - Total: 394
- Time zone: UTC+1 (CET)
  - Summer (DST): UTC+2 (CEST)
- Postal code: 991 35
- Area code: +421 47
- Vehicle registration plate (until 2022): VK
- Website: www.obecdacovlom.sk

Dačov Lom (Hungarian: Dacsólám) is a village and municipality in the Veľký Krtíš District of the Banská Bystrica Region of southern Slovakia.

== Geography ==
The municipality lies at an altitude of 488 metres (1,601 ft) and covers an area of 24.54 km^{2} (9.47 sq mi) (2025).

== History ==
It arose in 1943 with the union of Dolný (first mention in 1511 Lam Inferior) and Horný Dačov Lom (first mention in 1333 Lom). In 1333, Horný Dačov Lom belonged to nobles Dobáky, in 1337 to local feudatories Dacsóy and in the 18th century to Maitheény, Balassa and Zichy.

== Population ==
Population statistic (10 years)
| Year | 1995 | 2005 | 2015 | 2025 |
|---|---|---|---|---|
| Count | 442 | 417 | 428 | 394 |
| Difference | | −5.65% | +2.63% | −7.94% |

Population statistic
| Year | 2024 | 2025 |
|---|---|---|
| Count | 398 | 394 |
| Difference | | −1.00% |

It has a population of 394 people (31 December 2025).

=== Ethnicity ===
Census 2021 (1+ %)
| Ethnicity | Number | Fraction |
|---|---|---|
| Slovak | 384 | 95.76% |
| Not found out | 19 | 4.73% |
| Romani | 5 | 1.24% |
| Total | 401 | |

In year 2021 was 401 people by ethnicity 384 as Slovak, 19 as Not found out, 5 as Romani, 4 as Russian, 3 as Czech, 1 as German and 1 as Other.

Note on population: The difference values of population numbers in the table "Population statistic" and in the sections "Ethnicity" & "Religion" is caused by the use of various statistical methods.

=== Religion ===
Census 2021 (1+ %)
| Religion | Number | Fraction |
|---|---|---|
| Evangelical Church | 186 | 46.38% |
| Roman Catholic Church | 140 | 34.91% |
| None | 46 | 11.47% |
| Not found out | 21 | 5.24% |
| Other | 5 | 1.25% |
| Total | 401 | |

In year 2021 was 401 people by religion 186 from Evangelical Church, 140 from Roman Catholic Church, 46 from None, 21 from Not found out, 5 from Other, 2 from Greek Catholic Church and 1 from Other and not ascertained christian church.

== Genealogical resources ==
The records for genealogical research are available at the state archive "Statny Archiv in Banska Bystrica, Slovakia"

- Roman Catholic church records (births/marriages/deaths): 1792-1890 (parish B)
- Lutheran church records (births/marriages/deaths): 1731-1896 (parish A)

== See also ==
- List of municipalities and towns in Slovakia
