= Bulhary =

Bulhary may refer to:

- Bulhary (Břeclav District), a municipality and village in the Czech Republic
- Bulhary, Lučenec District, a municipality and village in Slovakia
