= Horná Strehová =

Horná Strehová Felsősztregova
- Municipality
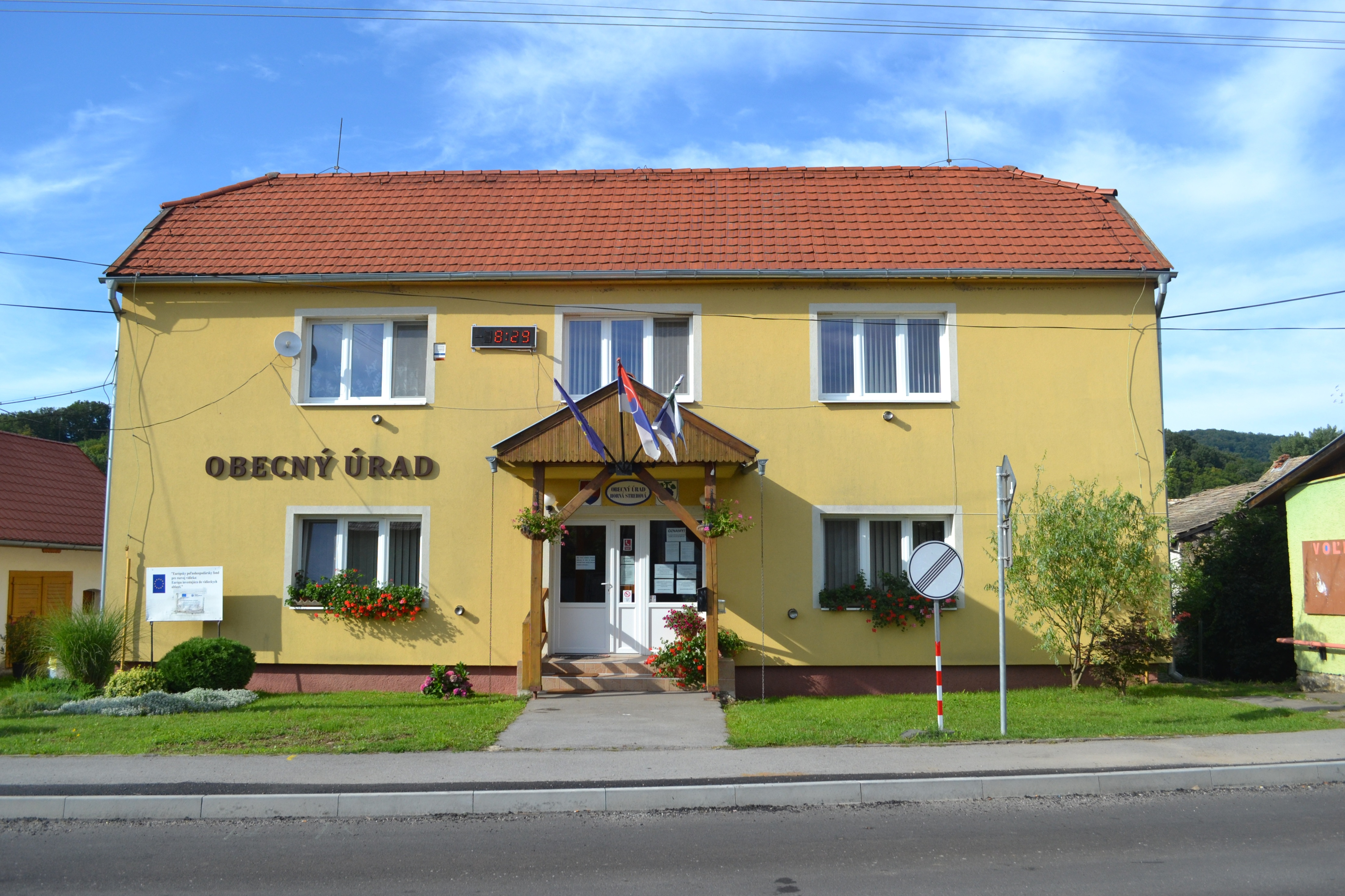

- Flag

- Location of Horná Strehová in the Banská Bystrica Region Location of Horná Strehová in Slovakia
- Coordinates: 48.28°N 19.43°E
- Country: Slovakia
- Region: Banská Bystrica Region
- District: Veľký Krtíš District
- First mentioned: 1493

Area
  - Total: 7.80 km^{2} (3.01 sq mi)
- Elevation: 205 m (673 ft)

Population (2025)
  - Total: 145
- Time zone: UTC+1 (CET)
  - Summer (DST): UTC+2 (CEST)
- Postal code: 991 02
- Area code: +421 47
- Vehicle registration plate (until 2022): VK
- Website: www.hornastrehova.dcom.sk

Horná Strehová (Hungarian: Felsősztregova) is a village and municipality in the Veľký Krtíš District of the Banská Bystrica Region of southern Slovakia.

== Geography ==
The municipality lies at an altitude of 205 metres (673 ft) and covers an area of 7.80 km^{2} (3.01 sq mi) (2025).

== History ==
In historical records, the village was first mentioned in 1493 (Zthergowa). It belonged to Divín and Modrý Kameň.

== Population ==
Population statistic (10 years)
Year	1995	2005	2015	2025
Count	176	201	162	145
Difference		+14.20%	−19.40%	−10.49%

Population statistic
Year	2024	2025
Count	144	145
Difference		+0.69%

It has a population of 145 people (31 December 2025).

=== Ethnicity ===
Census 2021 (1+ %)
Ethnicity	Number	Fraction
Slovak	151	98.69%
Not found out	3	1.96%
Total	153	

In year 2021 was 153 people by ethnicity 151 as Slovak and 3 as Not found out.

Note on population: The difference values of population numbers in the table "Population statistic" and in the sections "Ethnicity" & "Religion" is caused by the use of various statistical methods.

=== Religion ===
Census 2021 (1+ %)
Religion	Number	Fraction
Evangelical Church	70	45.75%
Roman Catholic Church	39	25.49%
None	39	25.49%
Not found out	2	1.31%
Greek Catholic Church	2	1.31%
Total	153	

In year 2021 was 153 people by religion 70 from Evangelical Church, 39 from Roman Catholic Church, 39 from None, 2 from Not found out, 2 from Greek Catholic Church and 1 from Other and not ascertained christian church.

== Genealogical resources ==
The records for genealogical research are available at the state archive "Statny Archiv in Banska Bystrica, Slovakia"

- Roman Catholic church records (births/marriages/deaths): 1811-1899 (parish B)
- Lutheran church records (births/marriages/deaths): 1725-1951 (parish A)

== See also ==
- List of municipalities and towns in Slovakia
