= Chrastince =

Chrastince Ipolyharaszti
- Municipality
- Flag

- Location of Chrastince in the Banská Bystrica Region Location of Chrastince in Slovakia
- Coordinates: 48.10°N 19.25°E
- Country: Slovakia
- Region: Banská Bystrica Region
- District: Veľký Krtíš District
- First mentioned: 1244

Area
  - Total: 4.04 km^{2} (1.56 sq mi)
- Elevation: 146 m (479 ft)

Population (2025)
  - Total: 196
- Time zone: UTC+1 (CET)
  - Summer (DST): UTC+2 (CEST)
- Postal code: 991 09
- Area code: +421 47
- Vehicle registration plate (until 2022): VK
- Website: www.chrastince.sk

Chrastince (Hungarian: Ipolyharaszti) is a village and municipality in the Veľký Krtíš District of the Banská Bystrica Region of southern Slovakia.

== Geography ==
The municipality lies at an altitude of 146 metres (479 ft) and covers an area of 4.04 km^{2} (1.56 sq mi) (2025).

== History ==
The village was first mentioned in King Béla IV's List in 1244 (1244 Gyormoth, 1299 Haraztigyormoth) as a donation to Balassa feudatory family. In the 18th century it belonged to Gürky family and in the 19th century to Zichy and Majthény. From 896 to 1920 and 1938 to 1945 it belonged to Hungary.

== Population ==
Population statistic (10 years)
Year	1995	2005	2015	2025
Count	231	242	239	196
Difference		+4.76%	−1.23%	−17.99%

Population statistic
Year	2024	2025
Count	201	196
Difference		−2.48%

It has a population of 196 people (31 December 2025).

=== Ethnicity ===
Census 2021 (1+ %)
Ethnicity	Number	Fraction
Slovak	179	86.05%
Hungarian	42	20.19%
Romani	26	12.5%
Not found out	8	3.84%
Total	208	

In year 2021 was 208 people by ethnicity 179 as Slovak, 42 as Hungarian, 26 as Romani, 8 as Not found out and 1 as Russian.

Note on population: The difference values of population numbers in the table "Population statistic" and in the sections "Ethnicity" & "Religion" is caused by the use of various statistical methods.

=== Religion ===
Census 2021 (1+ %)
Religion	Number	Fraction
Roman Catholic Church	165	79.33%
Not found out	19	9.13%
Evangelical Church	10	4.81%
Greek Catholic Church	7	3.37%
None	6	2.88%
Total	208	

In year 2021 was 208 people by religion 165 from Roman Catholic Church, 19 from Not found out, 10 from Evangelical Church, 7 from Greek Catholic Church, 6 from None and 1 from Ad hoc movements.

== Genealogical resources ==
The records for genealogical research are available at the state archive "Statny Archiv in Banska Bystrica, Slovakia"

- Roman Catholic church records (births/marriages/deaths): 1699-1897 (parish AB)
- Lutheran church records (births/marriages/deaths): 1721-1862 (parish B)

== See also ==
- List of municipalities and towns in Slovakia
