= Divín Castle =

Historic site in Slovakia

- Divínsky hrad or Divín hrad
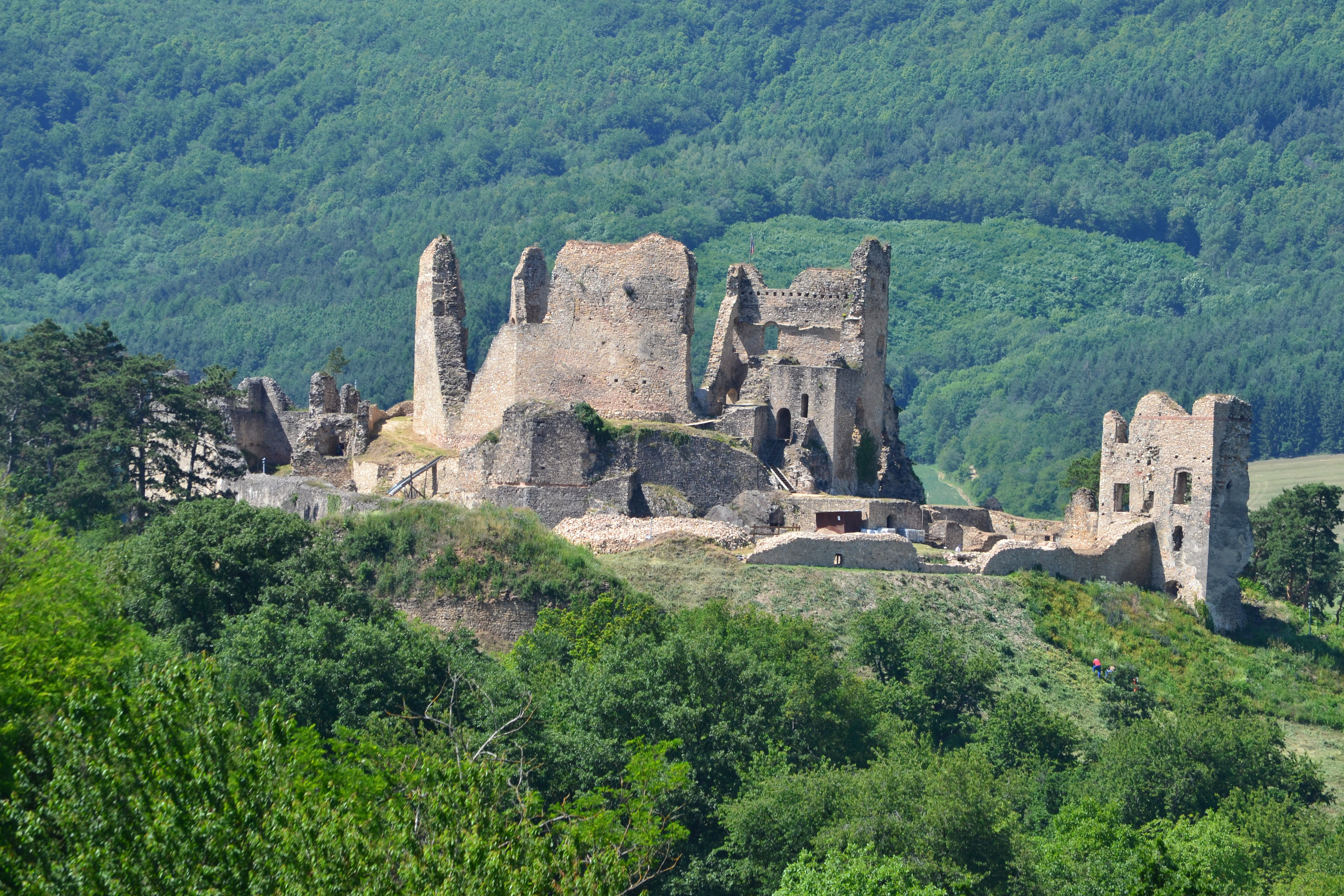
- View from afar

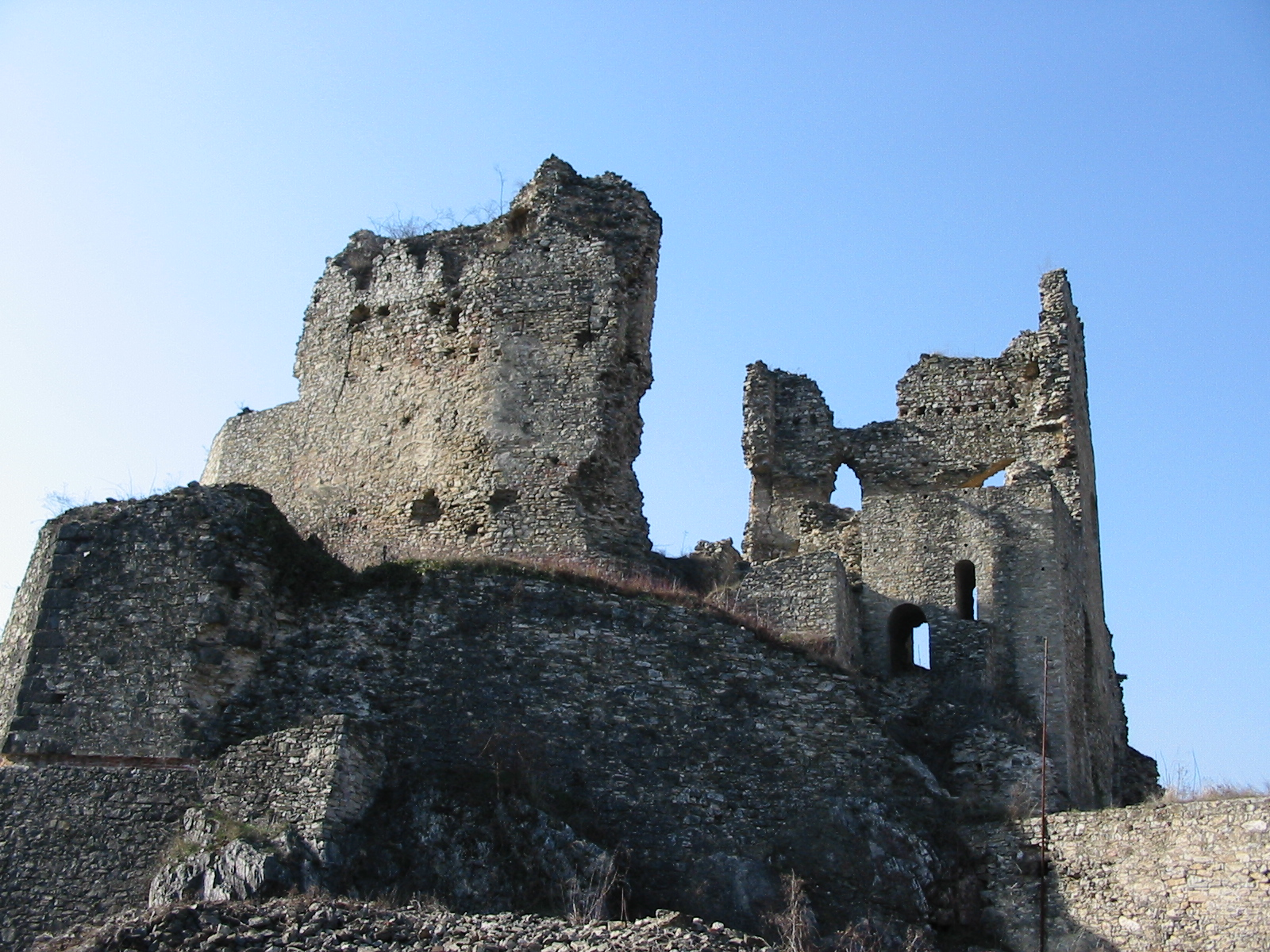
- Close-up

Site information
- Type: Castle

Location
- Coordinates: 48.448317°N 19.533042°E

Divín (Slovak: Divínsky hrad; also referred to as Divín Castle) is a Gothic castle ruin, located in the village of Divín in the Banská Bystrica Region of Slovakia.

The castle was built in the 13th century. In the 16th century, it was rebuilt to become an anti-Turkish fortress. However, the Turks managed to invade the territory, occupying Divin between 1575 and 1593. In the 17th century, the castle passed into the hands of the House of Balassa, one of the richest Hungarian families of the time. In 1694, it was demolished by the imperial general Strassoldo, and only its ruins remain today.

== History ==
The castle was built between 1275 and 1320 and was first mentioned in writing in 1329, along with the town, as Dyun. It was the seat of a manor and the property of the Tomaj and Lossonczy families, who had the castle expanded and fortified several times from the mid-14th century onward. In the 15th century, Divín was owned by the Lossoczy, Orság, and Nádasdy-Ongor families before becoming the property of the Balassa family in 1522. When the Ottomans captured the nearby Fiľakovo castle in 1554, Divín assumed a key role in the defense of what were then Lower Hungarian, now Central Slovak, mining towns. Consequently, in 1559, following a decree by the Hungarian Diet, it was transformed into an anti-Turkish fortress. Among other things, it received a firing bastion at the gate to the upper castle and an outer bailey on the southern side with two corner bastions. Nevertheless, in 1575 Turkish troops captured the castle and made it the center of a nahi (district) encompassing 15 villages, before the Imperial forces recaptured it in 1593.

In the early 17th century, the castle was fortified again, yet it was captured twice more during the Estates' Revolts: in 1605–1606 by Bocskai's troops and in 1619–1622 during Gabriel Bethlen's uprising. In 1650, Emmerich Balassa became the lord of the castle, from which the surrounding area was subsequently subjected to harassment and plunder. After two unsuccessful sieges in 1666 and 1674, the castle surrendered to Imperial troops in 1679, who then plundered and destroyed it. Following Balassa's death in 1683, the estate, along with the castle ruins, passed to the Zichy family in 1686, who retained it until 1945.

== Location ==
Originally, the castle was built on the top of a limestone cliff, which ended a series of hills extending into a marshy basin. The ground plan of the castle was elongated in a west-east direction.

== See also ==
- List of castles in Slovakia
