= Bulhary, Lučenec District =

Bulhary Bolgárom
- Municipality
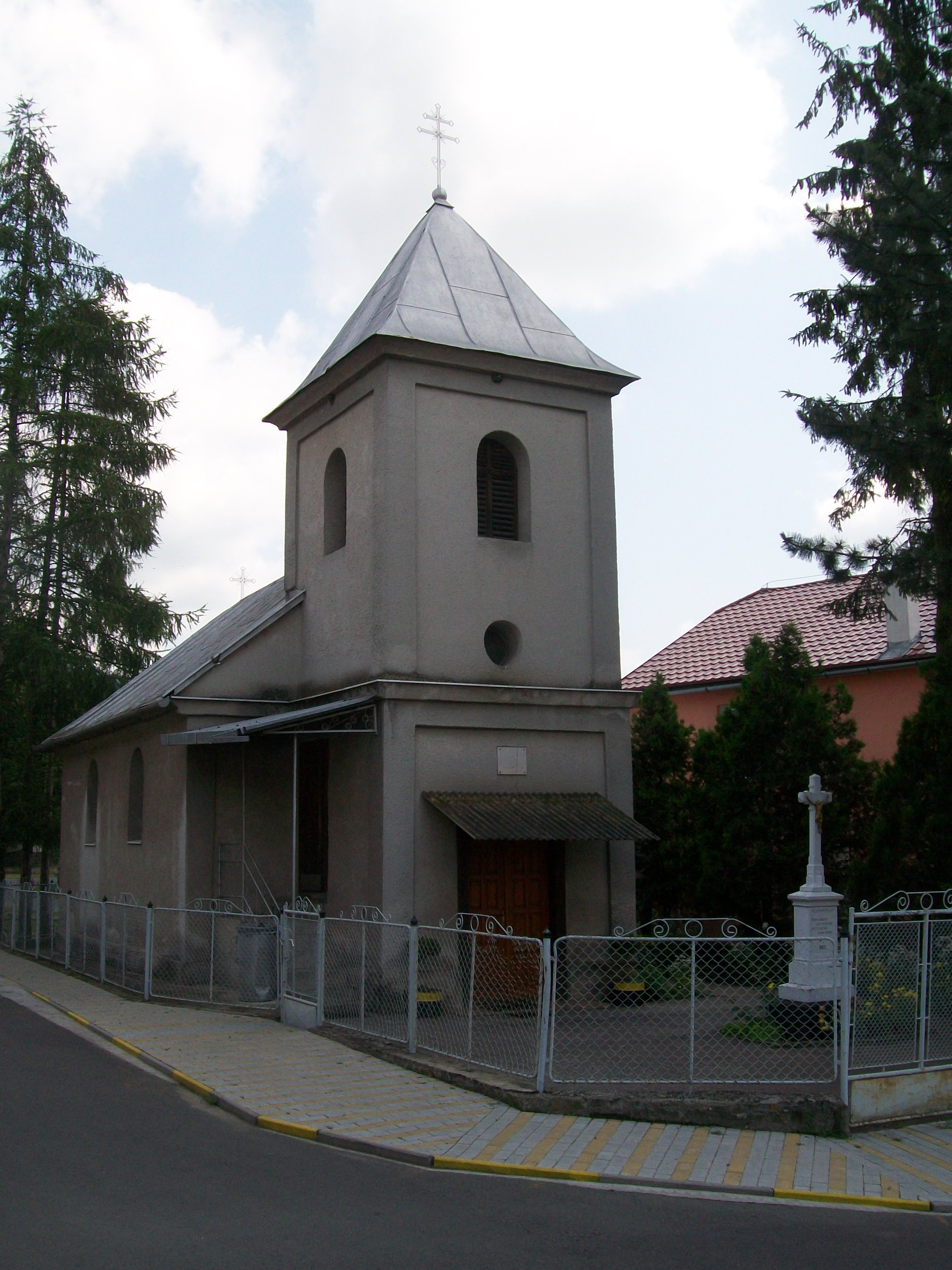
- Roman Catholic church in Bulhary

- Flag

- Location of Bulhary in the Banská Bystrica Region Location of Bulhary in Slovakia
- Coordinates: 48°18′N 19°51′E
- Country: Slovakia
- Region: Banská Bystrica Region
- District: Lučenec District
- First mentioned: 1435

Area
  - Total: 9.53 km^{2} (3.68 sq mi)
- Elevation: 220 m (720 ft)

Population (2025)
  - Total: 352
- Time zone: UTC+1 (CET)
  - Summer (DST): UTC+2 (CEST)
- Postal code: 986 01
- Area code: +421 47
- Vehicle registration plate (until 2022): LC
- Website: www.bulhary.sk

Bulhary (Hungarian: Bolgárom) is a village and municipality in the Lučenec District in the Banská Bystrica Region of Slovakia.

== History ==
In historical records, the village was first mentioned in 1435 (Bolgarom), it is however much older. In the early 16th century it belonged to Filakovo town and afterwards to the landowners Bebek, Serény, Balassa, and Vécsey. From 1554 to 1595 was occupied by Turks. Then it passed to the families Török, Révay, Berchtold and Coburg. From 1939 to 1944 it belonged to Hungary under the First Vienna Award.

== Genealogical resources ==
The records for genealogical research are available at the state archive "Statny Archiv in Banska Bystrica, Slovakia"

- Roman Catholic church records (births/marriages/deaths): 1715-1896 (parish B)
- Lutheran church records (births/marriages/deaths): 1783-1895 (parish B)

== Population ==
Population statistic (10 years)
Year	1995	2005	2015	2025
Count	295	292	318	352
Difference		−1.01%	+8.90%	+10.69%

Population statistic
Year	2024	2025
Count	347	352
Difference		+1.44%

It has a population of 352 people (31 December 2025).

=== Ethnicity ===
Census 2021 (1+ %)
Ethnicity	Number	Fraction
Hungarian	284	88.75%
Slovak	34	10.62%
Romani	7	2.18%
Not found out	7	2.18%
Total	320	

In year 2021 was 320 people by ethnicity 284 as Hungarian, 34 as Slovak, 7 as Romani, 7 as Not found out and 2 as Czech.

Note on population: The difference values of population numbers in the table "Population statistic" and in the sections "Ethnicity" & "Religion" is caused by the use of various statistical methods.

=== Religion ===
Census 2021 (1+ %)
Religion	Number	Fraction
Roman Catholic Church	265	82.81%
None	28	8.75%
Jehovah's Witnesses	10	3.13%
Not found out	6	1.88%
Greek Catholic Church	5	1.56%
Other	4	1.25%
Total	320	

In year 2021 was 320 people by religion 265 from Roman Catholic Church, 28 from None, 10 from Jehovah's Witnesses, 6 from Not found out, 5 from Greek Catholic Church, 4 from Other, 1 from Calvinist Church and 1 from Christian Congregations in Slovakia.

== See also ==
- List of municipalities and towns in Slovakia
