= Bălașa =

Bălașa is a Romanian surname. Notable people with the surname include:

- Cristian Bălașa (born 1972), Romanian football player and manager
- Daniel Bălașa (born 1981), Romanian footballer
- Mihai Bălașa (born 1995), Romanian footballer
- Sabin Bălașa (1932–2008), Romanian painter

== See also ==
- Valentín Balaša
- Balassa
