= Orlove =

Coordinates: 49°08′N 18°26′E

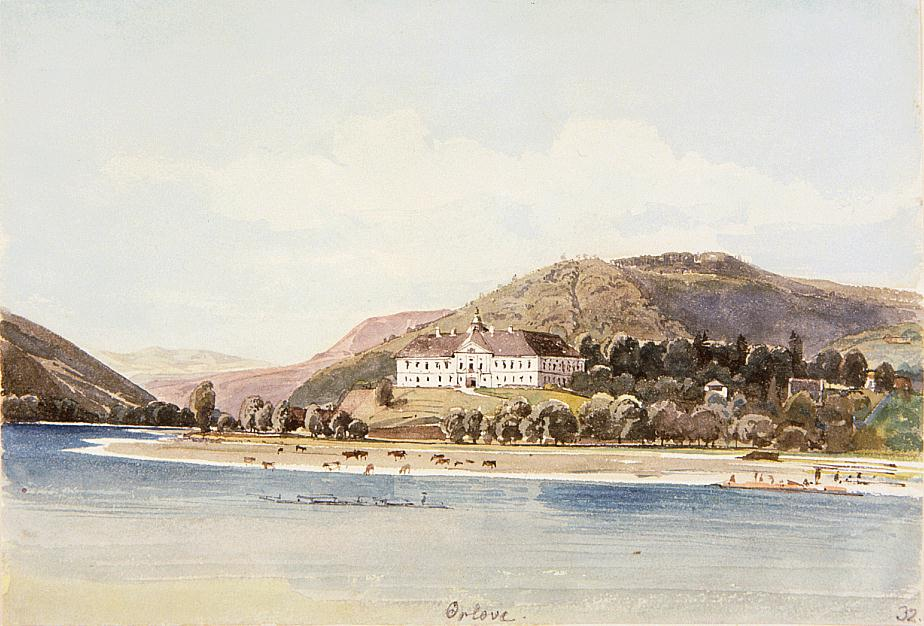
Orlove manor house

Orlové (Hungarian: Vágzsigmondháza) is a part of the city Považská Bystrica in northwestern Slovakia. It joined the city in 1971. In Orlove is situated a manor house from 1612 inside of it Kaplnka sv. Jána Nepomuckého.

== Demography ==
Orlové had in 2009 655 inhabitants.

== Geography ==
Area of Cadastral district of Orlove is 6 044 291 m².

== Location ==
Distance from Orlove to Považská Bystrica is 2,8 km.
