= Burg Považská Bystrica =

Burg
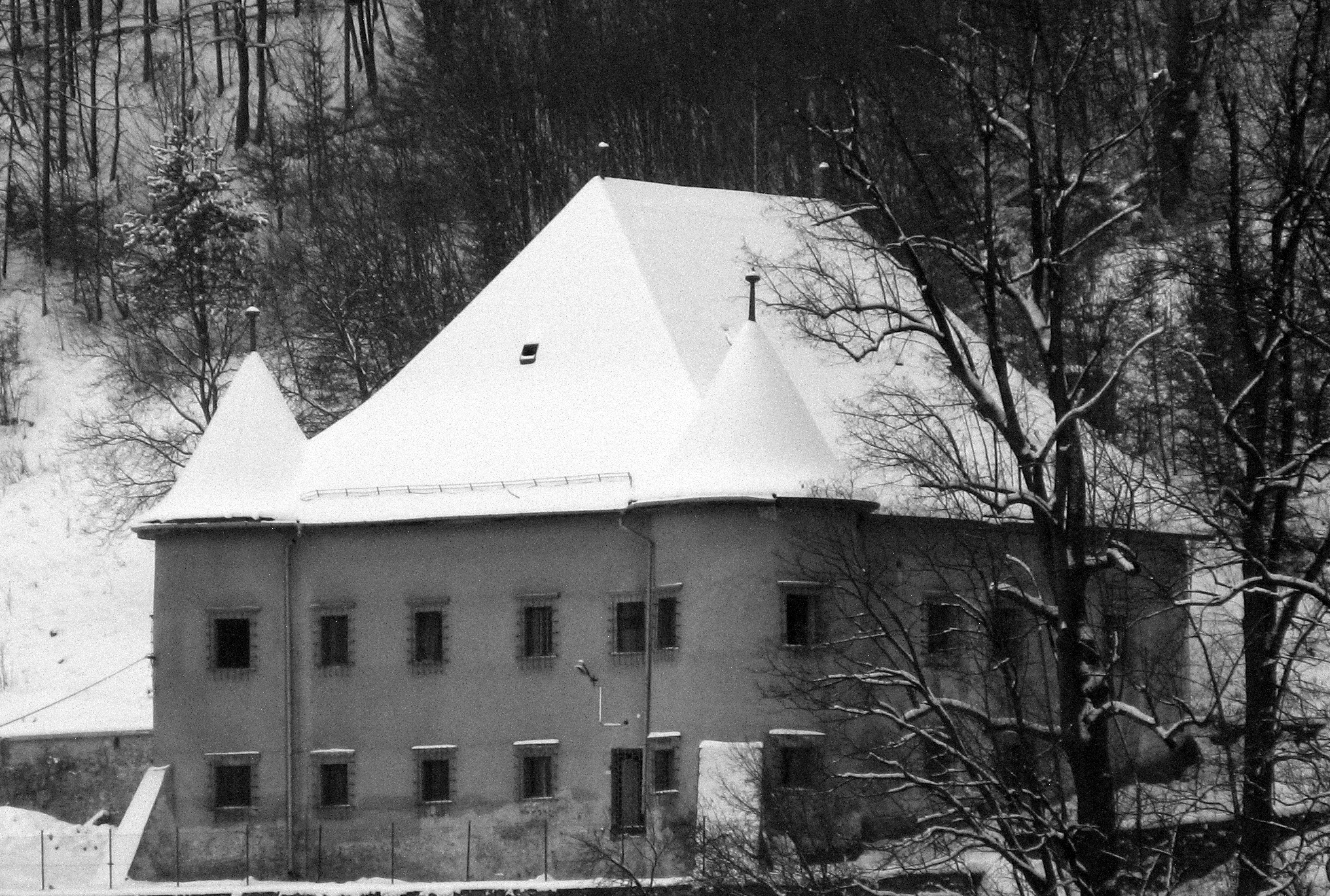
- Burg in winter.
- Interactive map of the Burg area

General information
- Type: Manor-house
- Location: 49.14354°N 18.45945°E, Slovakia
- Opened: 1631

Burg is a manor-house underneath the castle Považský hrad, on the south. Order to build the manor was given by Simon Balassa. Building works on the manor started in the first third of the 17th century and were finished 1631, when family moved from Castle. Last owner was baroness Popper, who supported reconstruction of the manor until after the World War I in 1919 it became possession of the state. Later it was bought by private company PARTNER PROGRESS, s.r.o. A gothic header joist was moved here from the castle.

== Gallery ==
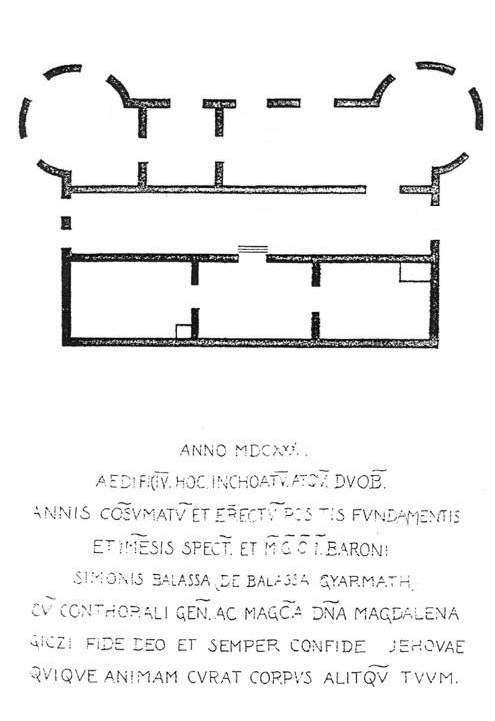
Groundplan and inscription above the entrance.

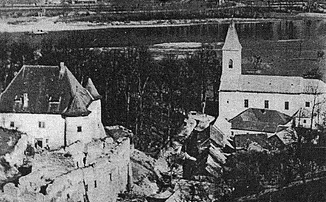
Burg in 1929.

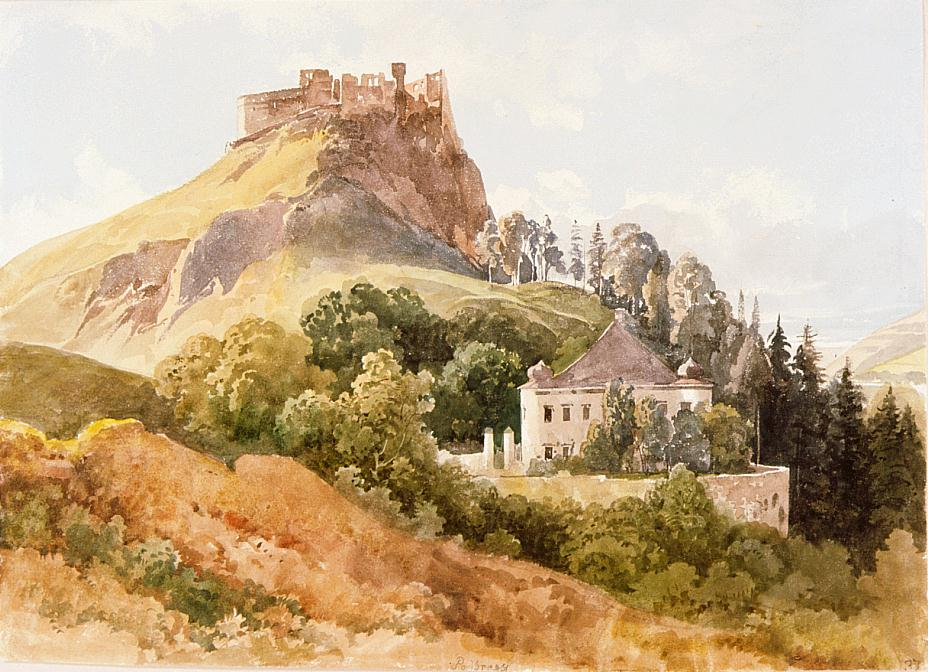
Burg with the castle above.

== Present situation ==
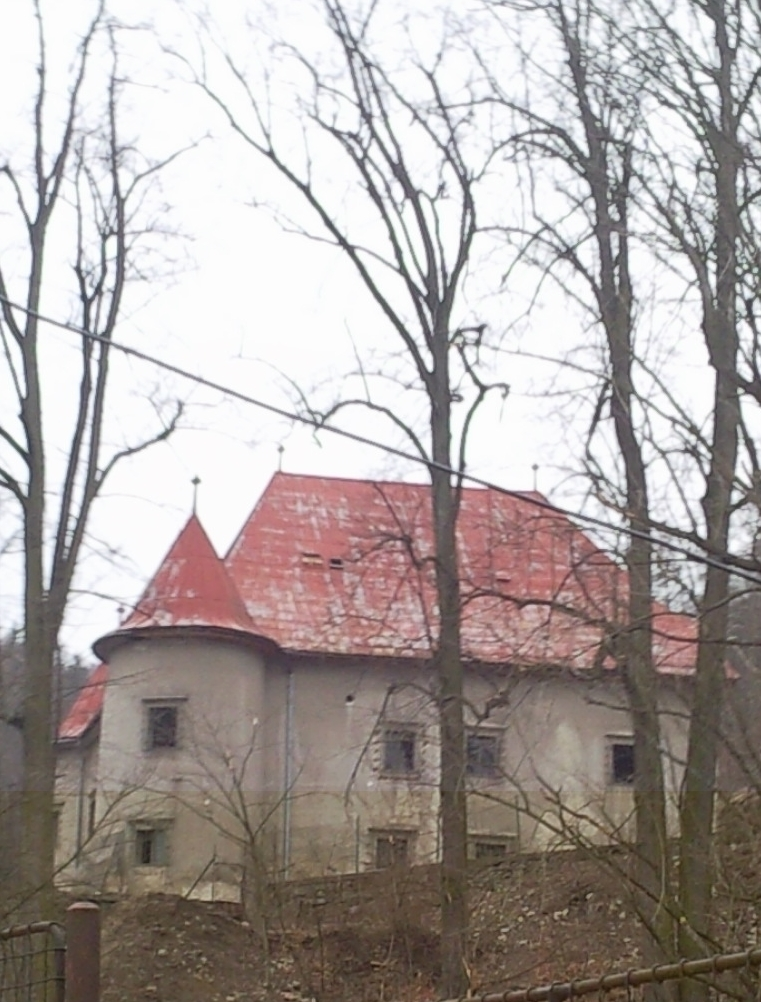

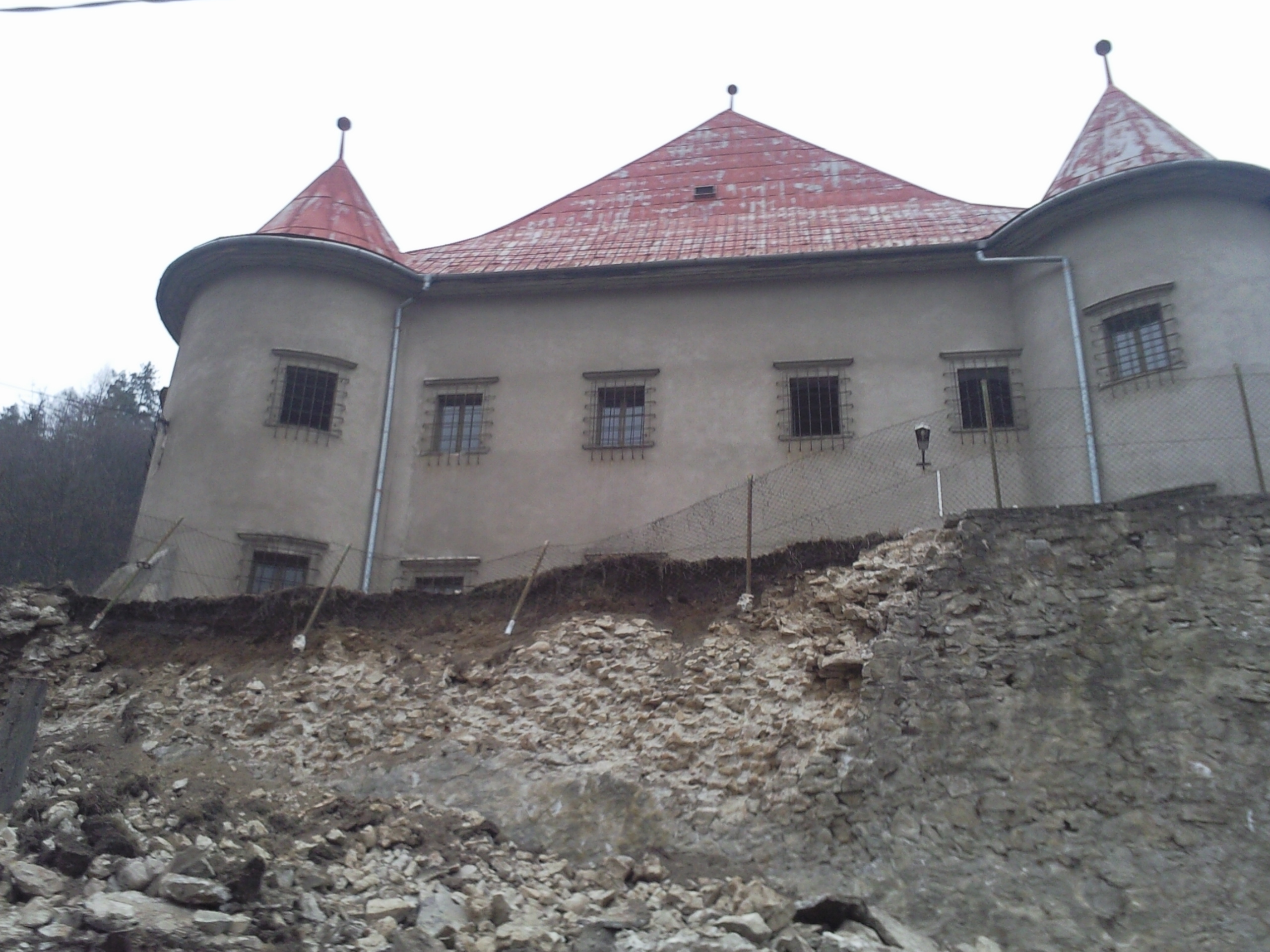

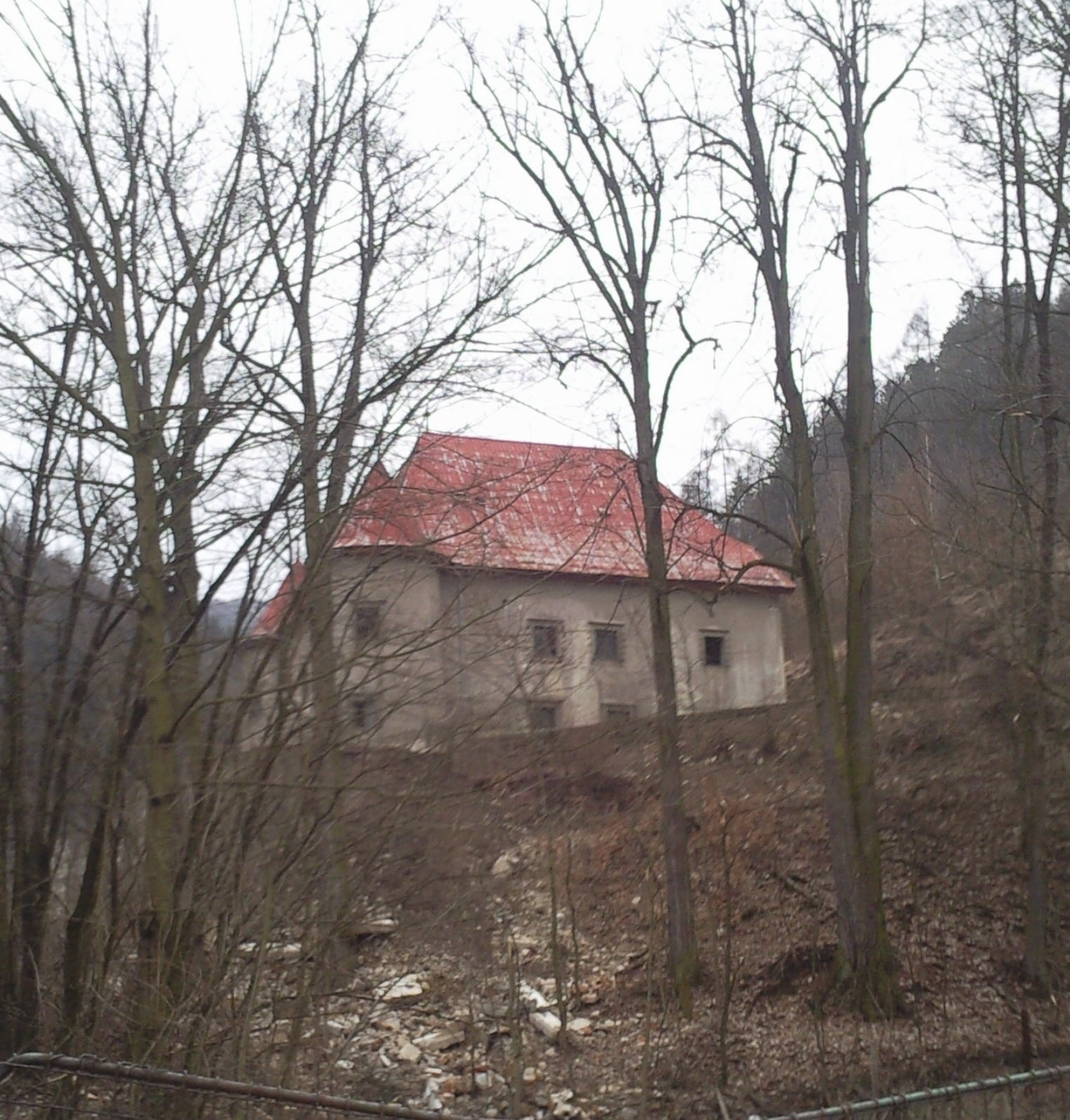

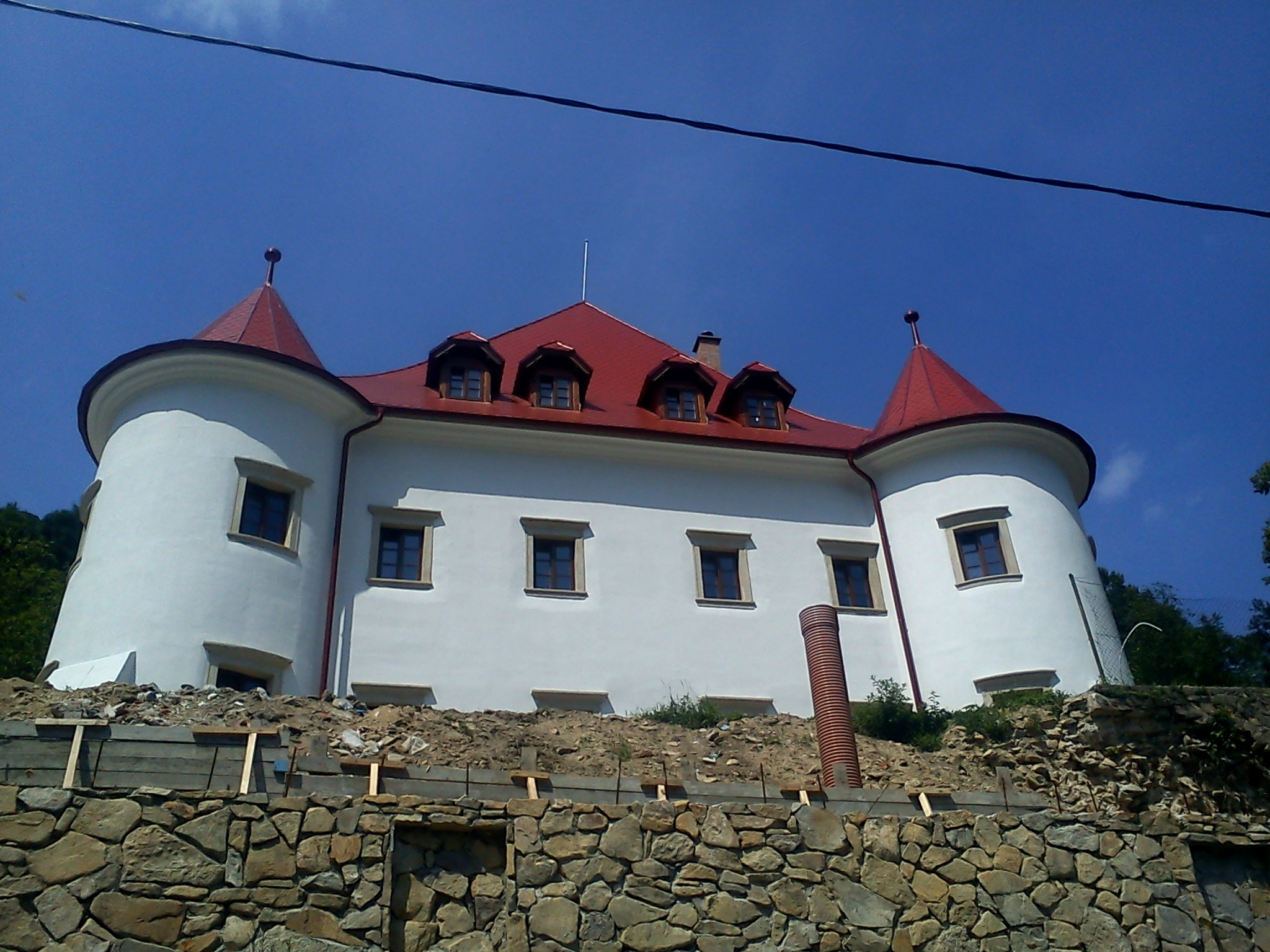
