= Divín =

Divín Divény
- Municipality
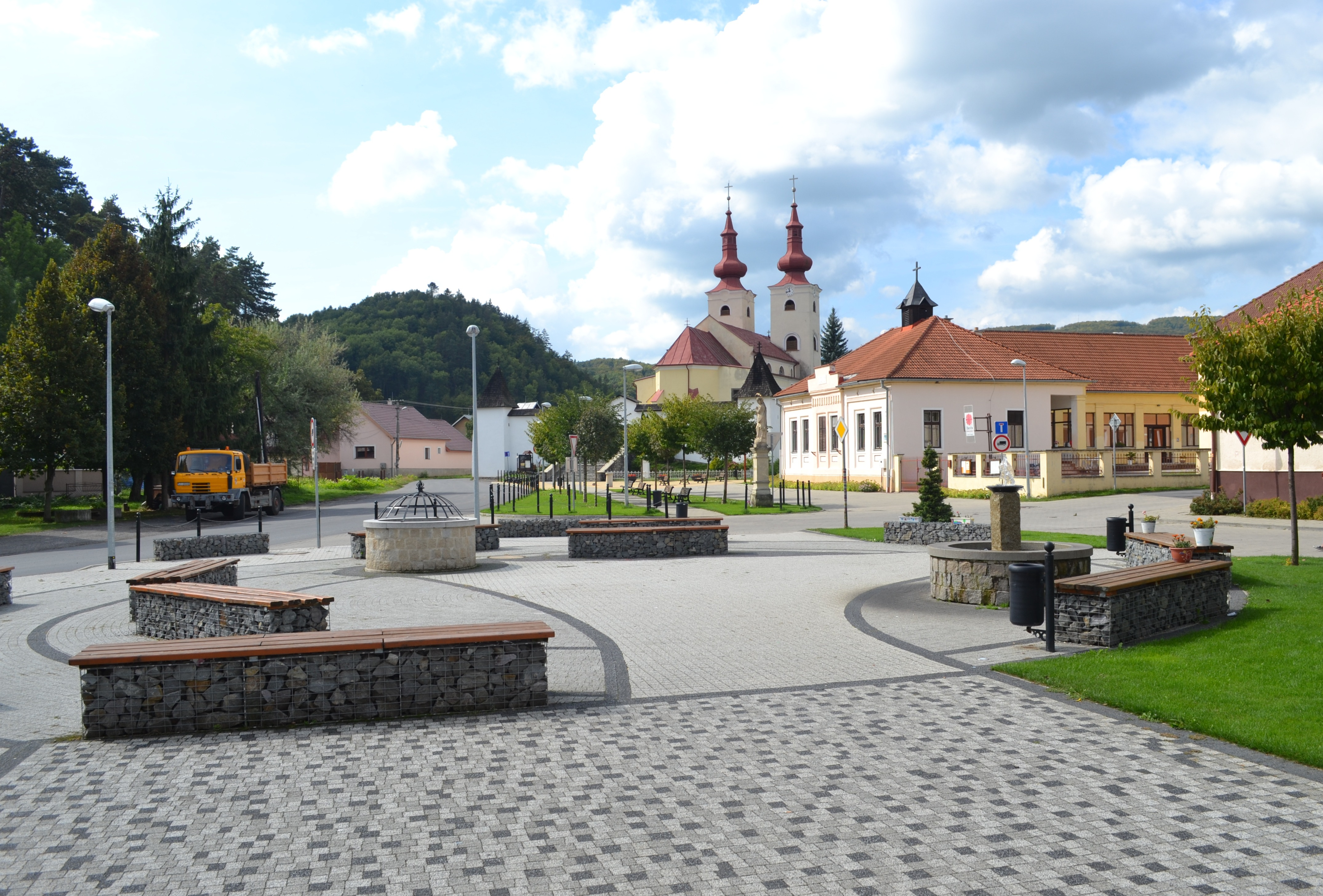
- Center of Divín

- Flag

- Location of Divín in the Banská Bystrica Region Location of Divín in Slovakia
- Coordinates: 48.45°N 19.53°E
- Country: Slovakia
- Region: Banská Bystrica Region
- District: Lučenec District
- First mentioned: 1329

Area
  - Total: 23.91 km^{2} (9.23 sq mi)
- Elevation: 434 m (1,424 ft)

Population (2025)
  - Total: 2,009
- Time zone: UTC+1 (CET)
  - Summer (DST): UTC+2 (CEST)
- Postal code: 985 52
- Area code: +421 47
- Vehicle registration plate (until 2022): LC
- Website: www.divin.sk

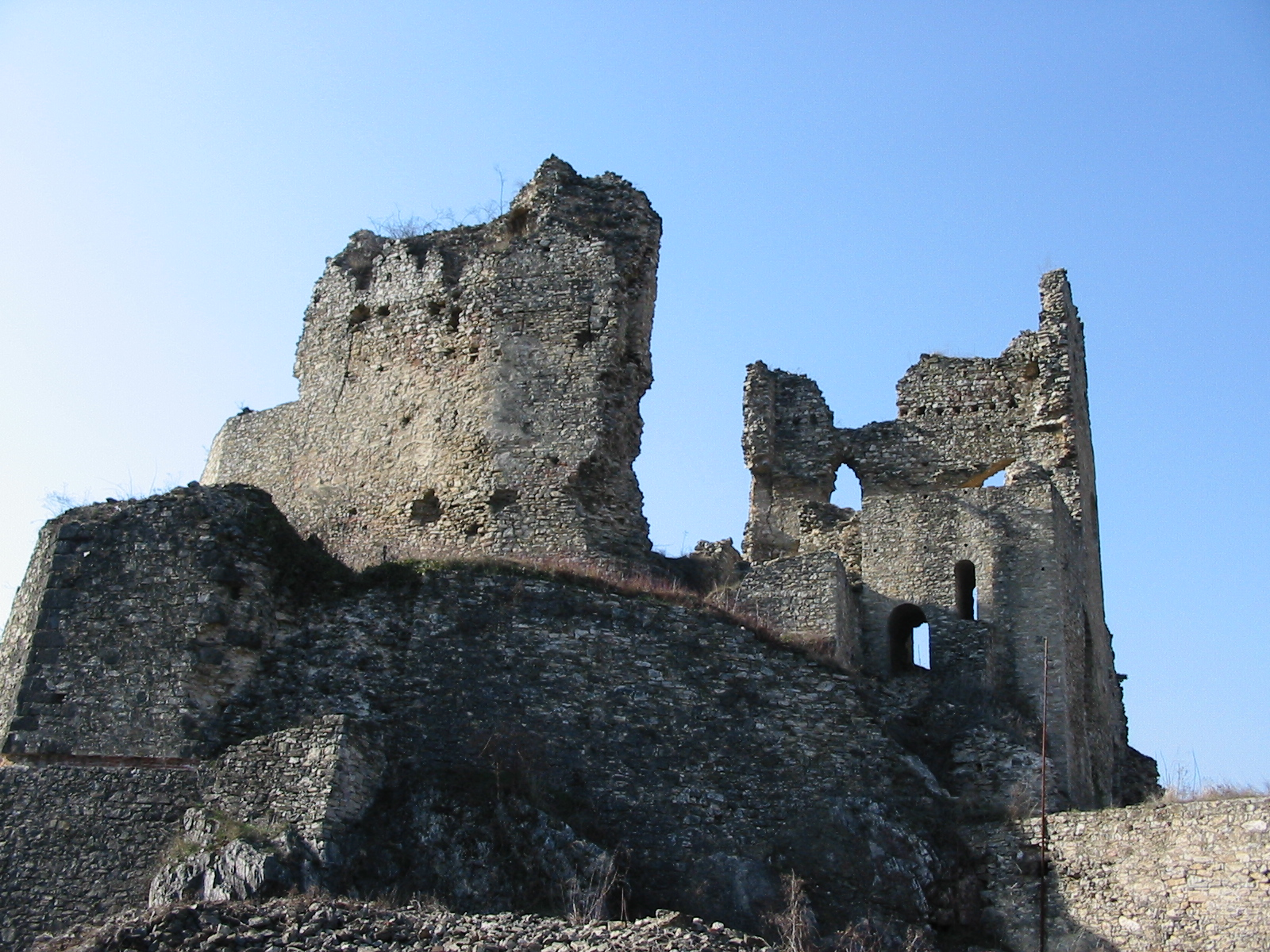
Divín Castle

Divín (German: Diwein; Hungarian: Divény) is a village and municipality in the Lučenec District in the Banská Bystrica Region of Slovakia.

== Geography ==
The municipality lies at an altitude of 434 metres (1,424 ft) and covers an area of 23.91 km^{2} (9.23 sq mi) (2025).

== History ==
In historical records, the village was first mentioned in 1329 as a parish and the Divín Castle (1329 castrum Dyun'villa sub eodem castro, 1393 Dyen, Dyuen, 1497 Dywyn, 1473 Dewen). Many noble families ruled the village and lived in the castle: Tomay, Lossonczy, Balassa, Zichy. In 1575 the fortress was occupied by Turks up to 1593. In 1604, it passed to nobles Bocskay, and after to Balassa family again. In 1674, the castle was destroyed by General Strassoldo.

== Population ==
Population statistic (10 years)
Year	1995	2005	2015	2025
Count	2091	2053	2077	2009
Difference		−1.81%	+1.16%	−3.27%

Population statistic
Year	2024	2025
Count	2012	2009
Difference		−0.14%

It has a population of 2009 people (31 December 2025).

=== Ethnicity ===
Census 2021 (1+ %)
Ethnicity	Number	Fraction
Slovak	2006	98.81%
Not found out	28	1.37%
Total	2030	

In year 2021 was 2030 people by ethnicity 2006 as Slovak, 28 as Not found out, 8 as Czech, 6 as Other, 5 as Russian, 3 as Romani, 3 as Hungarian, 1 as Rusyn, 1 as Polish and 1 as Moravian.

Note on population: The difference values of population numbers in the table "Population statistic" and in the sections "Ethnicity" & "Religion" is caused by the use of various statistical methods.

=== Religion ===
Census 2021 (1+ %)
Religion	Number	Fraction
Roman Catholic Church	1480	72.91%
None	315	15.52%
Not found out	93	4.58%
Evangelical Church	79	3.89%
Total	2030	

In year 2021 was 2030 people by religion 1480 from Roman Catholic Church, 315 from None, 93 from Not found out, 79 from Evangelical Church, 15 from Ad hoc movements, 12 from Jehovah's Witnesses, 9 from Christian Congregations in Slovakia, 9 from Greek Catholic Church, 6 from Other, 3 from Paganism and natural spirituality, 2 from Baptists Church, 1 from Old Catholic Church, 1 from Calvinist Church, 1 from Eastern Orthodox Church, 1 from Other and not ascertained christian church, 1 from Islam, 1 from United Methodist Church and 1 from Apostolic Church.

== Genealogical resources ==
The records for genealogical research are available at the state archive "Statny Archiv in Banska Bystrica, Slovakia"

- Roman Catholic church records (births/marriages/deaths): 1686-1895 (parish A)
- Lutheran church records (births/marriages/deaths): 1847-1904 (parish B)

== See also ==
- List of municipalities and towns in Slovakia
