= Balassa =

Balassa is a Hungarian surname. Notable people with the surname include:

- Bálint Balassa (1554–1594), Hungarian poet
  - Balint Balassi Memorial Sword Award, Hungarian literary award
- Béla Balassa (1928–1991), Hungarian economist
  - Balassa-Samuelson effect
- János Balassa (1815–1893), Hungarian surgeon
- Péter Balassa (born 1975), Hungarian footballer and politician
- Sándor Balassa (1935–2021), Hungarian composer

== See also ==
- Bălașa
