= Zlokuḱani =

Zlokuḱani may refer to:

- Zlokuḱani, Bitola, North Macedonia
- Zlokuḱani, Karpoš, North Macedonia
