= Lisolaj =

Lisolaj Лисолај Lisolai
- Village
- Location within North Macedonia
- Country: North Macedonia
- Region: Pelagonia
- Municipality: Bitola

Population (2021)
  - Total: 163
- Time zone: UTC+1 (CET)
  - Summer (DST): UTC+2 (CEST)

Lisolaj (Macedonian: Лисолај; /lisoʊlaɪ/) is a village in the Bitola Municipality of North Macedonia. It used to be part of the former municipality of Kukurečani.

== Geography ==
Lisolaj belongs to the so-called Pelagonia Region, in the geographical area of Pelagonia and the foot of the mountain Drevenik, 17 km north of the city of Bitola. The village is hilly, at an altitude of 746 meters. Above the settlement is the church of St. Petka, which is from the 19th century.

== History and Demographics ==
Line chart of the population and demographics of Lisolaj.

=== Legend ===
There are two different folk origins of the name of Lisolaj. A version originating from the now defunct Mojrodenkraj, an online Macedonian geographical and folk archive website, comes a story about a hunter who lost his children in the woods. The hunter ordered his dog (named Lisa (Лиса) to bark (lae (лае), the command to bark). The name of the village was formed by mixing these two words. This version of the story was further popularised by SBS news in the Macedonian language edition Another potential origin of the name Lisolaj comes from the much older Serbian monthly journal, Časopis Karadžić, in the 1900 edition. From a time, long before the townspeople (of 1900) can remember, a terrible plague struck the village. The townspeople found no solution to prevent it, causing many deaths, so they left instead, bringing their livestock with them. Eventually, the only living thing in the village was a dog with natural white discolourings on its body (лиси). Whenever people passed the deserted village, the dog was still barking (лаје), so they called (or renamed) the village to Lisolaj (лиси, Lisi, and лаје, luy).

=== Ottoman Control ===
Lisolaj is attested in the Ottoman defter of 1467/68 as a village in the vilayet of Manastir. Alongside Christian Slavic names, an individual attested as a priest of the village (prift) bore the typical Albanian anthroponym, Gjergj.

Sometime between 1797 and 1803, a local boundary dispute occurred between neighboring pasturers, where Mitrofan of Ramna (recorded in the text as Rizhano) chased away Gulab of Srpci, who was grazing cattle near Lisolaj.

According to the statistics of the Bulgarian ethnographer Vasil Kanchov ("Macedonia, Ethnography and Statistics") from 1900, Lisolaj had 340 inhabitants, all Bulgarians.

In a 2021 analysis of a 1901 Ottoman map, ethnographer Robert Mihajlovski (Роберт Михајловски) concluded that Lisolaj was a Bulgarian village with 45 houses.

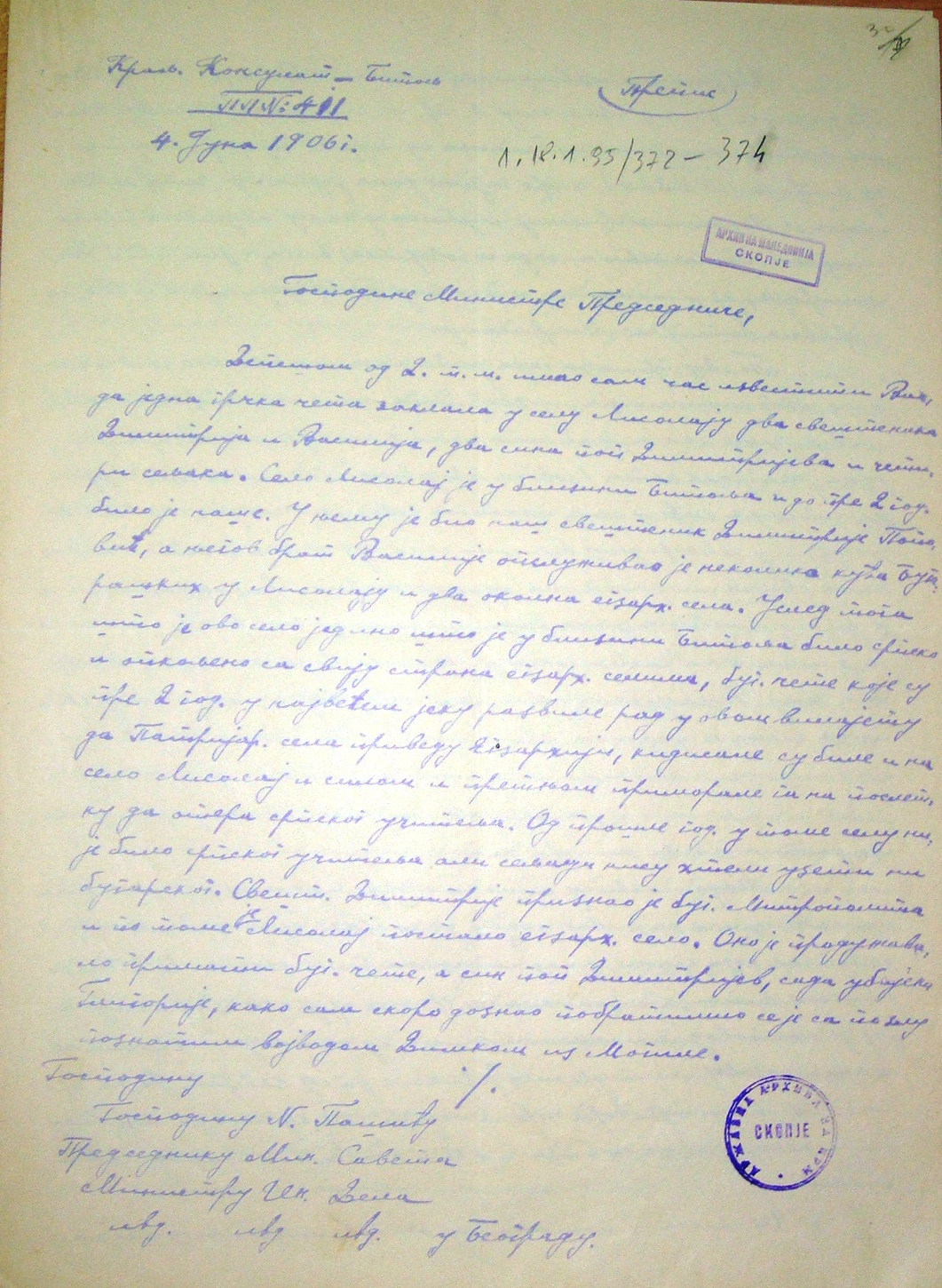
The 1906 Serbian document detailing the Greek attack on Lisolaj.

In 1904, Lisolaj switched allegiance from the Serbian Church to the Bulgarian Exarchate. A 1906 Serbian document adressed to the Serbian Minister of Education and Church Affairs (at the time Andra Nikolić) describes an attack by a Greek band on Lisolaj for the change in church allegiance. The attack date is not specified. In 2018, the Institute of History Belgrade produced a document which gave a more more detailed but also slightly different account on this event. According to Miscellanea, the village was very negatively affected by the Ilinden uprising in 1903, and in 1904 was forced to recognise the spiritual superiority of the Bulgarian Exarchate. Then, in 1905, Greek chetniks went to Lisolaj and organised it under the authority of the Ecumenical Patriarchate of Constantinople. It is not clear if the Greeks were attackers or liberators, or if the 1905 'organisation' was the same event as the attack described in the Serbian document.

According to the Bulgarian Exarchate Secretary Dimitar Mišev, ("La Macedoine et sa Population Chrétienne") in 1905 there were 400 Bulgarians in Lisolaj.

On 19, 20, or 21 May 1906, a band of 12 or 120 Bulgarians were 'annihilated' by a detachment of Turks at Lisolaj, with the chetniks suffering 11 casualties. The Americus Times names Lisolaj as 'the scene of previous butcheries' and El Tiempo says the reason was because the Bulgarian band were loitering on the border. All newspapers record the name of Lisolaj as 'Lisolai' instead.

In July 1908, the VMORO stopped raiding the village.

In the First and Second Balkan Wars, Velyo Dimov (Velyan) (Вельо Димов (Велян)) volunteered to fight for the 1st company of the 9th Veles Battalion of the Macedonian-Adrianopolitan Volunteer Corps. He originated from Lisolaj, and was enlisted from October 2, 1912 — August 10, 1913.

=== World Wars ===
==== World War I ====
In World War I, the German Empire sent reinforcement troops to Lisolaj, where they had projectors to watch movies for military morale. The residents of Lisolaj were also allowed to watch with the occupying German soldiers.

==== World War II ====
In World War II, the ethnic Macedonian from Lisolaj, Stojčevski Đorđi, was killed in Syrmia fighting the Yugoslavian Liberation War. The Germans also issued a map of the Bitola region for the purposes of ethnic clensing, and recorded that Lisolaj had 425–450 ethnically Macedonian inhabitants. Although the map was created in 1941, it was based on 1931 census data.

=== Communist and post Yugoslavia ===
Many residents moved away to other areas such as Bitola, Skopje, Australia, the United States, Germany, and other European countries.

On the 22nd August, 2013, a forest fire near the Lisolaj and Drevenik villages was extinguished by the Army of the Republic of Macedonia using Mi 8 and Mi 17 helicopters with 44 tons of water.

According to the 2021 census, the village had a total of 163 inhabitants. Ethnic groups in the village include:

- Macedonians: 153
- Persons who were not interviewed and had basic data taken from administrative sources: 10

== Sport ==
Lisolaj has a soccer team called the FK Lisolaj (ФК Лисолаj). Their first recorded match is on 25 August 2019 against Crna Reka, and there is still continued recorded activity from team. The team captain is Zoran Sekulovski. On 12 December 2023, the team was crowned autumn champions in the Bitola municipality.
