= Lopatica =

Lopatica may refer to the following places:

== Moldova ==
- Lopățica

== North Macedonia ==
- Lopatica (Prilep)
- Lopatica (Bitola)
