= Rotino =

Rotino Ротино
- Village
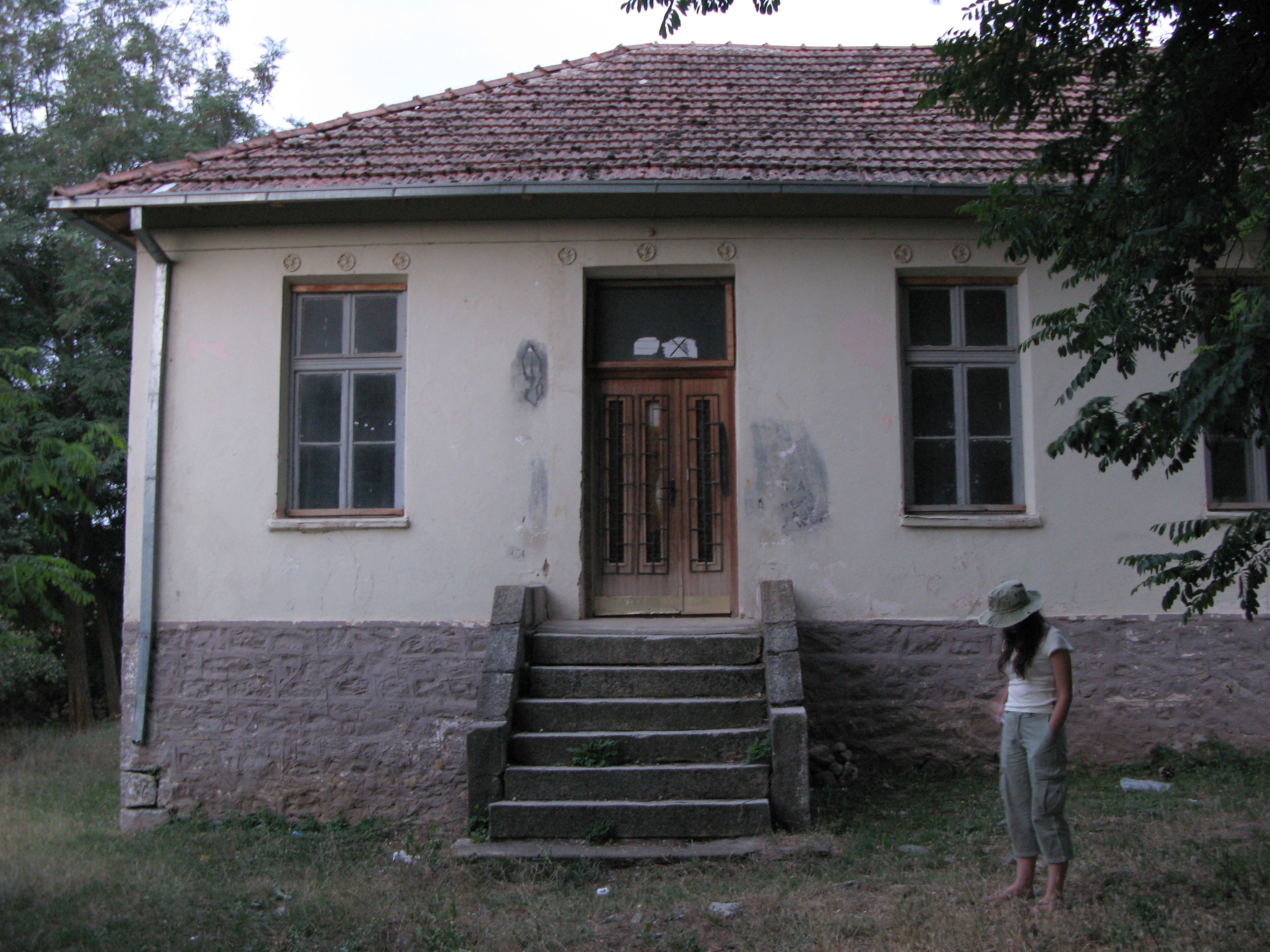
- An old school in Rotino

- Location within North Macedonia
- Country: North Macedonia
- Region: Pelagonia
- Municipality: Bitola

Population (2002)
  - Total: 113
- Time zone: UTC+1 (CET)
  - Summer (DST): UTC+2 (CEST)

Rotino (Macedonian: Ротино) is a village in the Bitola Municipality of North Macedonia, situated in the Pelagonia region in the southwestern part of the country. It lies in the foothills of Baba Mountain. Nearby villages include Brusnik, Capari and Gjavato. Prior to the territorial reorganization, Rotino was part of the former municipality of Capari.

== History and landmarks ==
A segment of the Roman-era road Via Egnatia is found in the village with the toponym Arnautski Pat, stemming from Arnaut, the Ottoman Turkish rendering for Albanians, and suggests either direct linguistic contact with Albanians or the former presence of an assimilated Albanian community. Rotino is attested in the Ottoman defter of 1467/68 as a village in the vilayet of Manastir. A part of the inhabitants attested bore typical Albanian anthroponyms, such as Gjon and Gjergj.

=== Notable sites ===
- Old Village School – A now-abandoned yet historically important school building that once served the children of Rotino.
- Church of St. Gjorgija – A small Macedonian Orthodox church that remains a spiritual center for locals and returning diaspora.

== Demographics ==
According to the 2002 census, the village had a total of 113 inhabitants. Ethnic groups in the village include:

- Macedonians 113

Rotino has experienced population decline due to urban migration and emigration, particularly during the 20th century. However, it continues to be visited by descendants of former residents, especially during summer and religious holidays.

== Diaspora ==
A portion of the Rotino diaspora lives in Australia, particularly in Sydney, where they maintain a connection to their roots through family, church, and cultural organizations.
