= Dragožani =

Dragožani Драгожани
- Village
- Location within North Macedonia
- Coordinates: 41°6′40.46″N 21°17′34.13″E
- Country: North Macedonia
- Region: Pelagonia
- Municipality: Bitola

Population (2002)
  - Total: 156
- Time zone: UTC+1 (CET)
  - Summer (DST): UTC+2 (CEST)

Dragožani (Macedonian: Драгожани) is a village in the Bitola Municipality of North Macedonia. It used to be part of the former municipality of Kukurečani.

== Demographics ==
Dragožani is attested in the Ottoman defter of 1467/68 as a village in the vilayet of Manastir. The inhabitants attested largely bore typical Slavic anthroponyms along with a few instances of Albanian ones, such as Gin Arbanash and Stajko brother-in-law of Gon.

According to the 2002 census, it has a population of 156. Ethnic groups in the village include:
