= Staro Zmirnovo =

Staro Zmirnovo Старо Змирново Smirnovë e Vjetër
- Village
- Location within North Macedonia
- Coordinates: 41°06′N 21°18′E
- Country: North Macedonia
- Region: Pelagonia
- Municipality: Bitola

Population (2021)
  - Total: 0
- Time zone: UTC+1 (CET)
  - Summer (DST): UTC+2 (CEST)
- Car plates: BT
- Website: .

Staro Zmirnovo (Macedonian: Старо Змирново, Albanian: Smirnovë e Vjetër) is a village in the municipality of Bitola, North Macedonia. It used to be part of the former municipality of Kukurečani.

== Demographics ==
Staro Zmirnovo is attested in the Ottoman defter of 1467/68 as a village in the vilayet of Manastir. The inhabitants attested bore typical Christian anthroponyms along with instances of Albanian and Slavic ones: Dimitri, son of Rade, Gjin, son of Sirak.

Staro Zmirnovo has traditionally and exclusively been populated by Muslim Albanians.

In statistics gathered by Vasil Kanchov in 1900, the village of Staro Zmirnovo was inhabited by 70 Muslim Albanians.

As of the 2021 census, Staro Zmirnovo had zero residents.

According to the 2002 census, the village had a total of 10 inhabitants who self declared as Macedonians, their mother tongue as the Albanian language and being of the Muslim faith.
