= Gabalavci =

Gabalavci Габалавци
- Village
- Location within North Macedonia
- Country: North Macedonia
- Region: Pelagonia
- Municipality: Bitola

Population (2021)
  - Total: 69
- Time zone: UTC+1 (CET)
  - Summer (DST): UTC+2 (CEST)

Gabalavci (Macedonian Cyrillic: Габалавци) is a village located 13.86 kilometres (8.61 mi) from Bitola, the second-largest city in North Macedonia. It was formerly part of the former municipality of Kukurečani

== Demographics ==
In 1961 the village had 286 inhabitants, most of the 200 inhabitants of the village are displaced in Bitola, Skopje, Europe, Australia and overseas countries.

According to the 2002 census, the village had a total of 114 inhabitants. Ethnic groups in the village include:

- Macedonians 114
