= Dragarino =

Dragarino Драгарино
- Village
- Location within North Macedonia
- Coordinates: 41°5′51.69″N 21°18′31.83″E
- Country: North Macedonia
- Region: Pelagonia
- Municipality: Bitola

Population (2021)
  - Total: 84
- Time zone: UTC+1 (CET)
  - Summer (DST): UTC+2 (CEST)

Dragarino (Macedonian: Драгарино) is a village in the Bitola Municipality of North Macedonia. It used to be part of the former municipality of Kukurečani.

== Demographics ==
Dragarino is attested in the Ottoman defter of 1467/68 as a village in the vilayet of Manastir. The inhabitants attested largely bore typical Slavic anthroponyms along with a few instances of Albanian ones, such as Gerg siromah, Gjon son of Dujko and Martin son of Nikolla.

In statistics gathered by Vasil Kanchov in 1900, the village of Dragarino was inhabited by 250 Christian Bulgarians.

As of the 2021 census, Dragarino had 84 residents with the following ethnic composition:

- Macedonians 77
- Persons for whom data are taken from administrative sources 7

According to the 2002 census, it has a population of 86. The entirety of the village are ethnic Macedonians.
