= Crnovec =

Crnovec Црновец Cërnoec
- Village
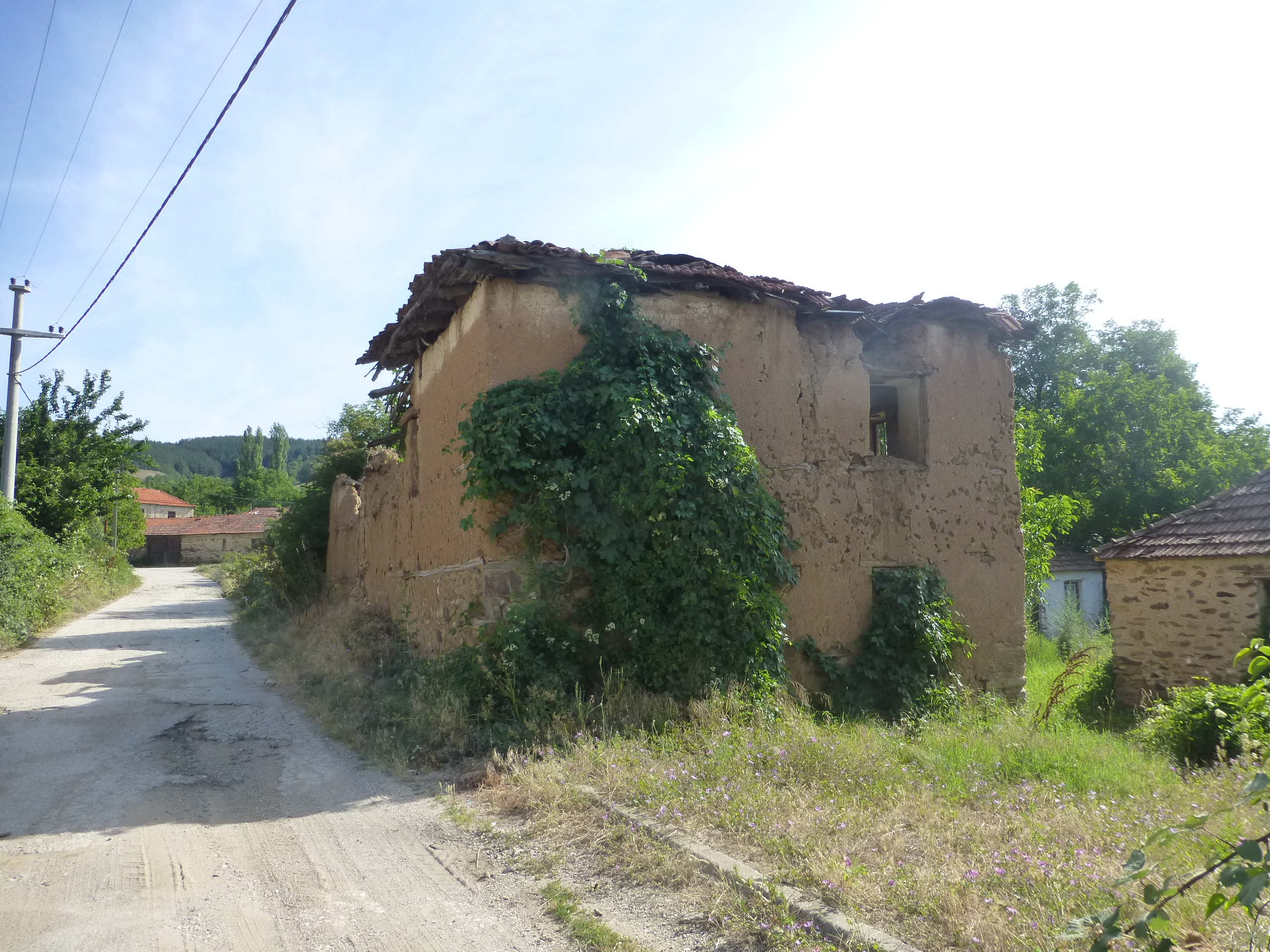
- An older adobe building in Crnovec

- Location within North Macedonia
- Coordinates: 41°9′24.29″N 21°13′28.23″E
- Country: North Macedonia
- Region: Pelagonia
- Municipality: Bitola

Population (2021)
  - Total: 31
- Time zone: UTC+1 (CET)
  - Summer (DST): UTC+2 (CEST)
- Car plates: BT

Crnovec (Macedonian: Црновец, Albanian: Cërnoec) (other name as Crneec) is a village in the municipality of Bitola, North Macedonia. It is located west of Macedonian Hwy P1305 (Demir Hisar-Bitola), in the valley of the Šemnica River, downstream from the Streževo Dam. It used to be part of the former municipality of Kukurečani.

== Demographics ==
Crnovec is attested in the Ottoman defter of 1467/68 as a village in the vilayet of Manastir. A majority of names attested were Slavic, while a minority of inhabitants bore Albanian and mixed Slavic-Albanian anthroponyms, such as Leko, son of Bogdançe, Gon Kovaç, Gin Siromah among others.

In the early 19th Century population of Crnovec are Tosks, a subgroup of southern Albanians.

In statistics gathered by Vasil Kanchov in 1900, the village of Crnovec was inhabited by 500 Muslim Albanians.

In early 20th century Macedonians population start to be settled in Crnovec. In 1961 the village had 636 inhabitants. The inhabitants of the village are displaced from Crnovec in North Macedonia others city to Bitola, Skopje, and Outside of North Macedonia in Europe, Australia, Canada and USA.

According to the 2002 census, the village had a total of 86 inhabitants. Ethnic groups in the village include:

- Macedonians 66
- Albanians 18
- Turks 1
- Others 1

As of the 2021 census, Crnovec had 31 residents with the following ethnic composition:

- Albanians 12
- Macedonians 14
- Persons from whom data are taken from administrative sources 5
