= Novo Zmirnovo =

Novo Zmirnovo Ново Змирново
- Village
- Location within North Macedonia
- Country: North Macedonia
- Region: Pelagonia
- Municipality: Bitola

Population (2002)
  - Total: 41
- Time zone: UTC+1 (CET)
  - Summer (DST): UTC+2 (CEST)

Novo Zmirnovo (Macedonian: Ново Змирново) is a village in the Bitola Municipality of North Macedonia. It used to be part of the former municipality of Kukurečani. Novo Zmirnovo distance is 10.12 km (6.29 mi) away from the center of the municipality.

== Demographics ==
According to the 2002 census, the village had a total of 41 inhabitants. Ethnic groups in the village include:

- Macedonians 41
