= Sekirani =

Sekirani Секирани
- Village
- Location within North Macedonia
- Country: North Macedonia
- Region: Pelagonia
- Municipality: Bitola

Population (2002)
  - Total: 114
- Time zone: UTC+1 (CET)
  - Summer (DST): UTC+2 (CEST)

Sekirani (Macedonian Cyrillic: Секирани) is a village 11.84 kilometres (7.36 mi) away from Bitola, which is the second-largest city in North Macedonia. It used to be part of the former municipality of Kukurečani.

== Demographics ==
Sekirani is attested in the Ottoman defter of 1467/68 as a village in the vilayet of Manastir. The names attested were almost entirely Slavic in character, while a small minority of inhabitants bore Albanian and mixed Slavic-Albanian anthroponyms.

According to the 2002 census, the village had a total of 114 inhabitants. Ethnic groups in the village include:

- Macedonians 114
