= Lažec =

Lažec Лажец Luzeç
- Village
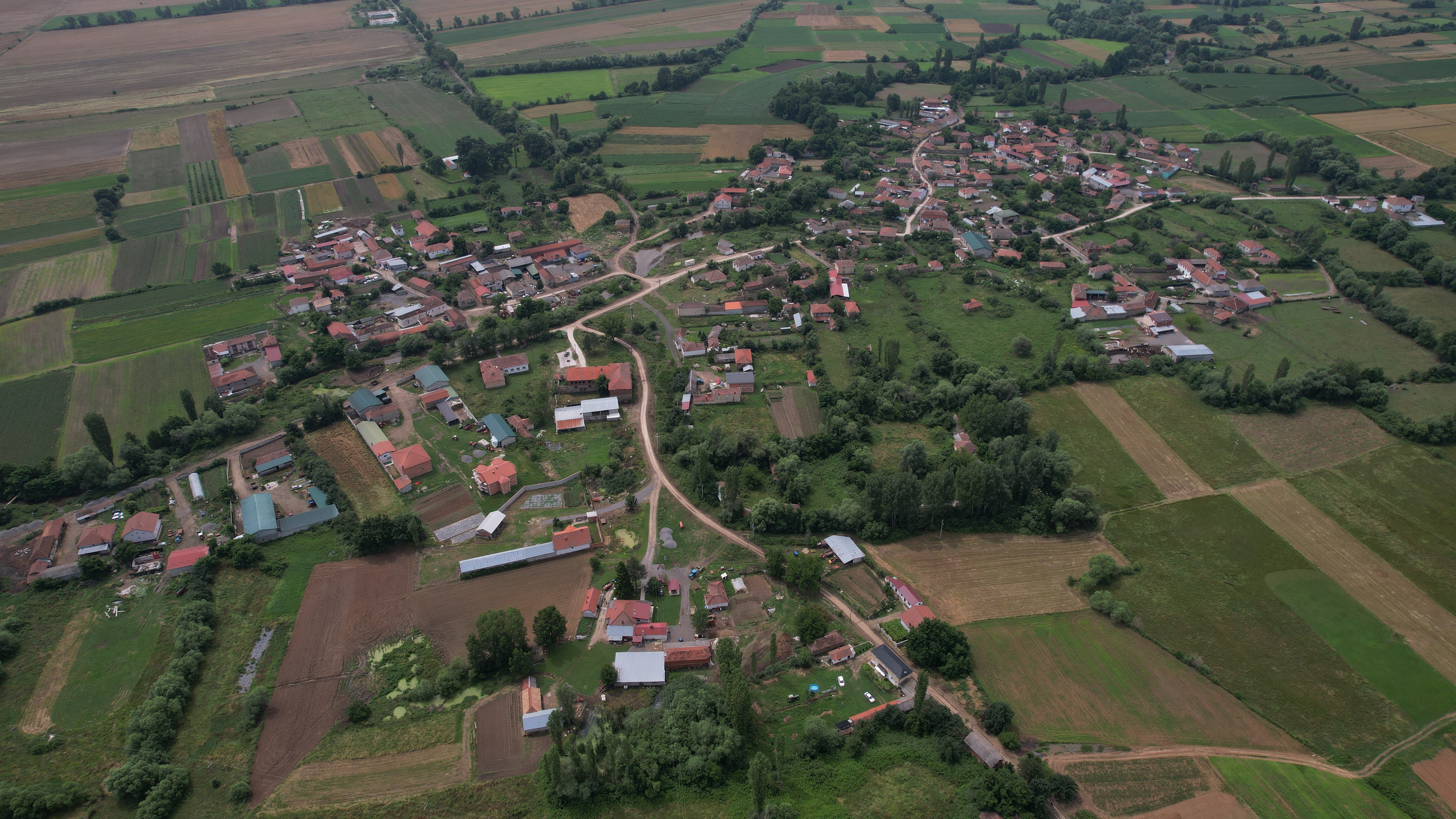
- Air view of the village

- Location within North Macedonia
- Coordinates: 40°55′N 21°23′E
- Country: North Macedonia
- Municipality: Bitola Municipality
- Statistical region: Pelagonia Statistical Region

Population (2002)
  - Total: 302
- Time zone: UTC+1 (CET)
  - Summer (DST): UTC+2 (CEST)
- Car plates: BT
- Website: .

Lažec (Macedonian: Лажец; Albanian: Luzeç) is a village in the municipality of Bitola, North Macedonia.

== Demographics ==
According to the 1467-68 Ottoman defter, Lažec displayed mixed Albanian and Slavic anthroponymy, with instances of individuals bearing both Slavic and Albanian names (e.g., Gjon Cvetko).

In statistics gathered by Vasil Kanchov in 1900, the village of Lažec was inhabited by 340 Christian Bulgarians and 400 Muslim Albanians.

According to the statistics of geographer Dimitri Mishev (D. M. Brancoff), the town had a total Christian population of 360 in 1905, of which all were Patriarchist Bulgarians.

According to the 2002 census, the village had a total of 302 inhabitants. Ethnic groups in the village include:

- Macedonians 161
- Albanians 135
- Serbs 4
- Others 2
