= Porodin, North Macedonia =

Porodin Породин Porodin
- Village
- Породин
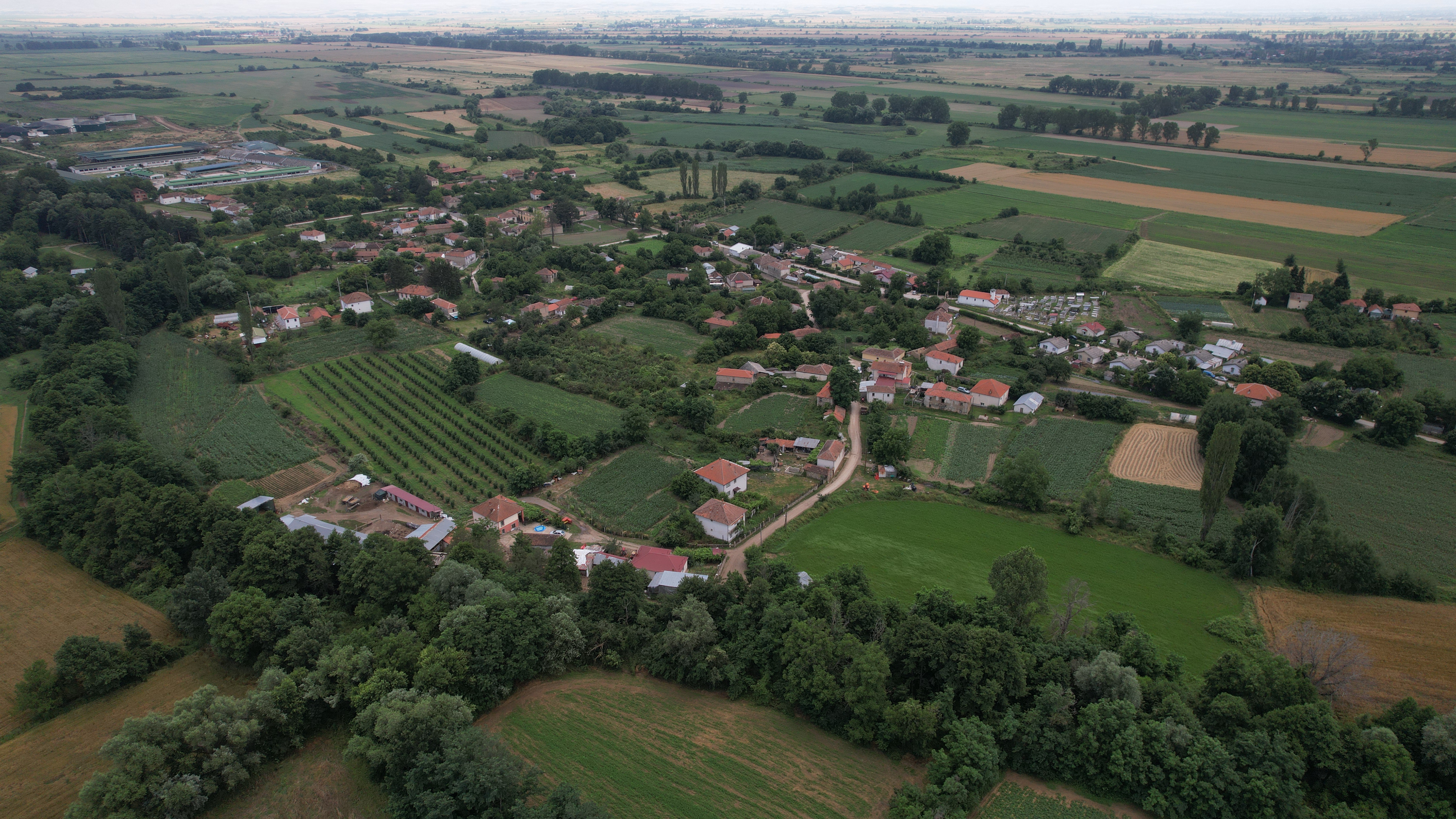
- Air view of the village

- Location within North Macedonia
- Coordinates: 40°56′N 21°22′E
- Country: North Macedonia
- Region: Pelagonia
- Municipality: Bitola

Population (2002)
  - Total: 202
- Time zone: UTC+1 (CET)
  - Summer (DST): UTC+2 (CEST)
- Car plates: BT
- Website: .

Porodin (Macedonian: Породин, Albanian: Porodin) is a village in the municipality of Bitola, North Macedonia. It used to be part of the former municipality of Bistrica.

== History ==
Porodin contains two major archaeological sites within its boundaries. Bara Tumba, a Neolithic settlement, was discovered in 1953 and its findings are kept at the Institute and Museum Bitola. Veluška Tumba is also a Neolithic site.

== Demographics ==
According to the 1467-68 Ottoman defter, the village had 68 houses, 4 bachelors and 8 widows. Some of the heads of families had traditional Albanian names, such as the following: Gjin Arnaut (t. Arbanas), Goja son of Vilan, Koja (Goja) son of Nikola, Koja son of Dragusha, Lazor Koja, Dimitri son of Koja ( Goja).

In statistics gathered by Vasil Kanchov in 1900, the village of Porodin was inhabited by 300 Christian Bulgarians and 190 Muslim Albanians. According to the 2002 census, the village had a total of 202 inhabitants. Ethnic groups in the village include:

- Macedonians 194
- Albanians 6
- Others 2

As of the 2021 census, Porodin had 139 residents with the following ethnic composition:

- Macedonians 110
- Albanians 17
- Persons for whom data are taken from administrative sources 11
- Serbs 1
