= Kanino =

Kanino Канино
- Village
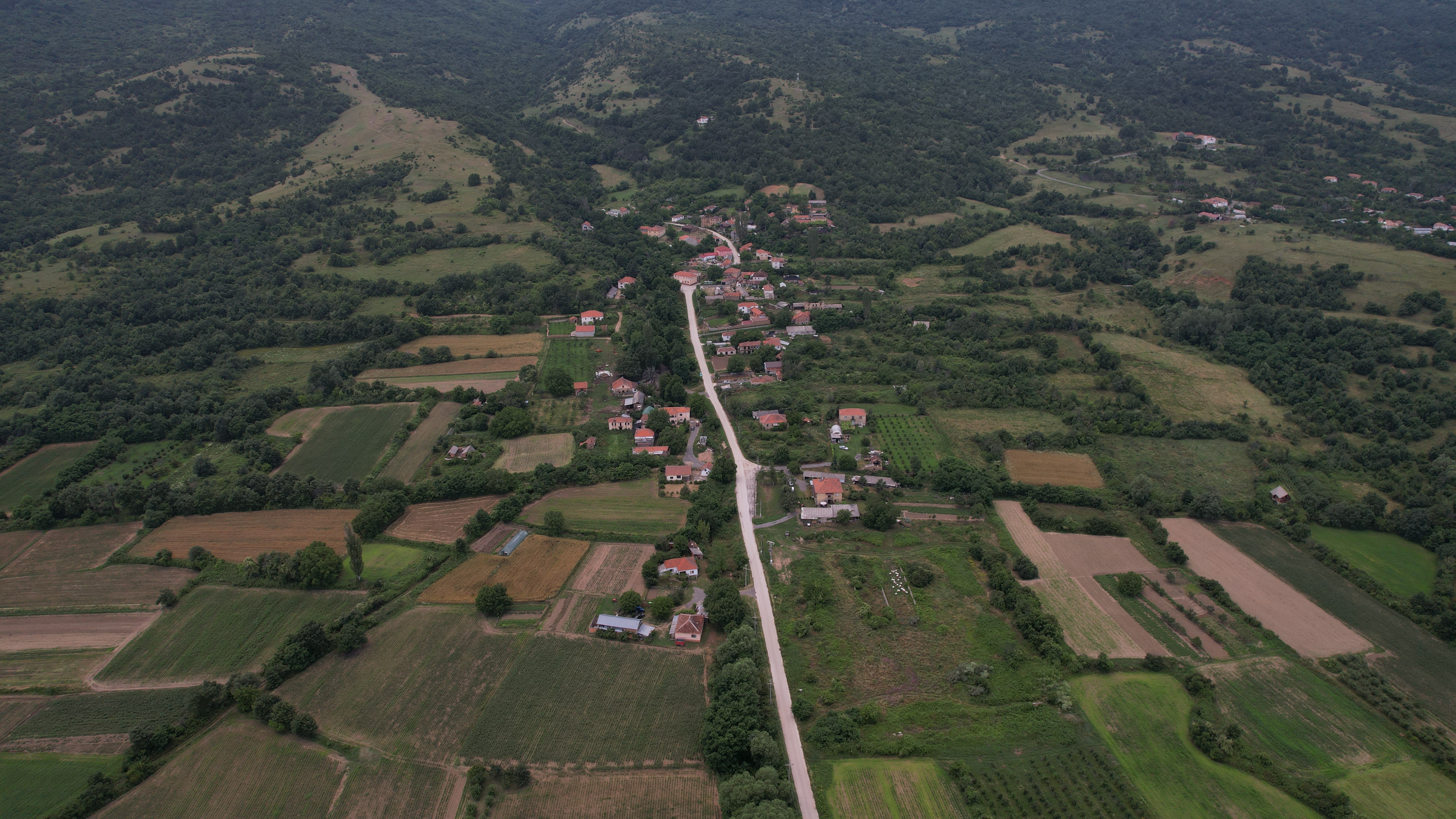
- Air view of the village Kanino

- Location within North Macedonia
- Coordinates: 41°02′N 21°16′E
- Country: North Macedonia
- Region: Pelagonia
- Municipality: Bitola

Population (2021)
  - Total: 104

Kanino (Macedonian Cyrillic: Канино) is a village 9.64 kilometres (5.99 mi) away from Bitola, which is the second-largest city in North Macedonia. It used to be part of the former municipality of Bistrica.

== Demographics ==
Kanino appears in 15th century Ottoman defters as a village in the nahiyah of Manastır. Among its inhabitants, instances of household heads bearing the attribute Arnaut, a medieval Ottoman rendering for Albanians, are also present: Pejo Arnaut and Mile Arnaut.

In statistics gathered by Vasil Kanchov in 1900, the village of Kanino was inhabited by 190 Muslim Albanians and 60 Bulgarian Exarchists.

As of the 2021 census, Kanino had 104 residents with the following ethnic composition:

- Macedonians 89
- Persons for whom data are taken from administrative sources 15

According to the 2002 census, the village had a total of 111 inhabitants. Ethnic groups in the village include:

- Macedonians 107
- Serbs 2
- Others 2
