= Graešnica, Bitola =

Graešnica Граешница Grashnicë
- Village
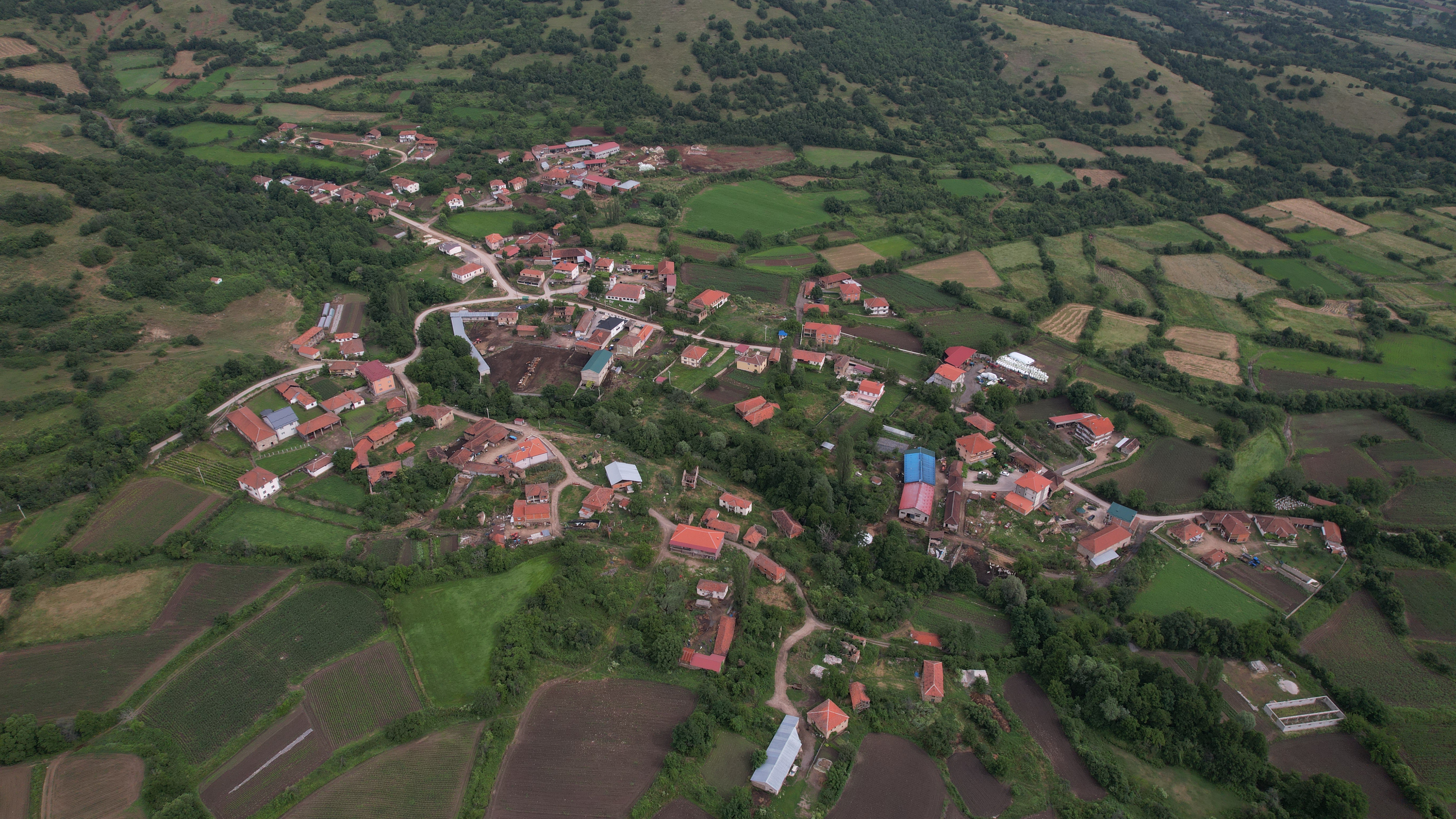
- Air view of the village

- Location within North Macedonia
- Coordinates: 41°12′N 21°18′E
- Country: North Macedonia
- Region: Pelagonia
- Municipality: Bitola
- Elevation: 881 m (2,890 ft)

Population (2002)
  - Total: 190
- Time zone: UTC+1 (CET)
  - Summer (DST): UTC+2 (CEST)
- Postal code: 7223
- Area code: +389 047
- Car plates: BT
- Website: .

Graešnica (Macedonian: Граешница; Albanian: Grashnicë) is a village in the Bitola Municipality of North Macedonia. It used to be part of the former municipality of Bistrica.

== History ==
Graeešnica (Gradešnica) is attested in the Ottoman defter of 1467/68 as a village in the vilayet of Manastir. The majority of the inhabitants attested bore typical Albanian anthroponyms, such as Gjin, Gjon, Lazor, Dedë etc.

== Demographics ==
According to the 2002 census, the village had a total of 190 inhabitants. Ethnic groups in the village include:

- Albanians 172
- Macedonians 17
- Others 1
