= Barešani =

Barešani Барешани
- Village
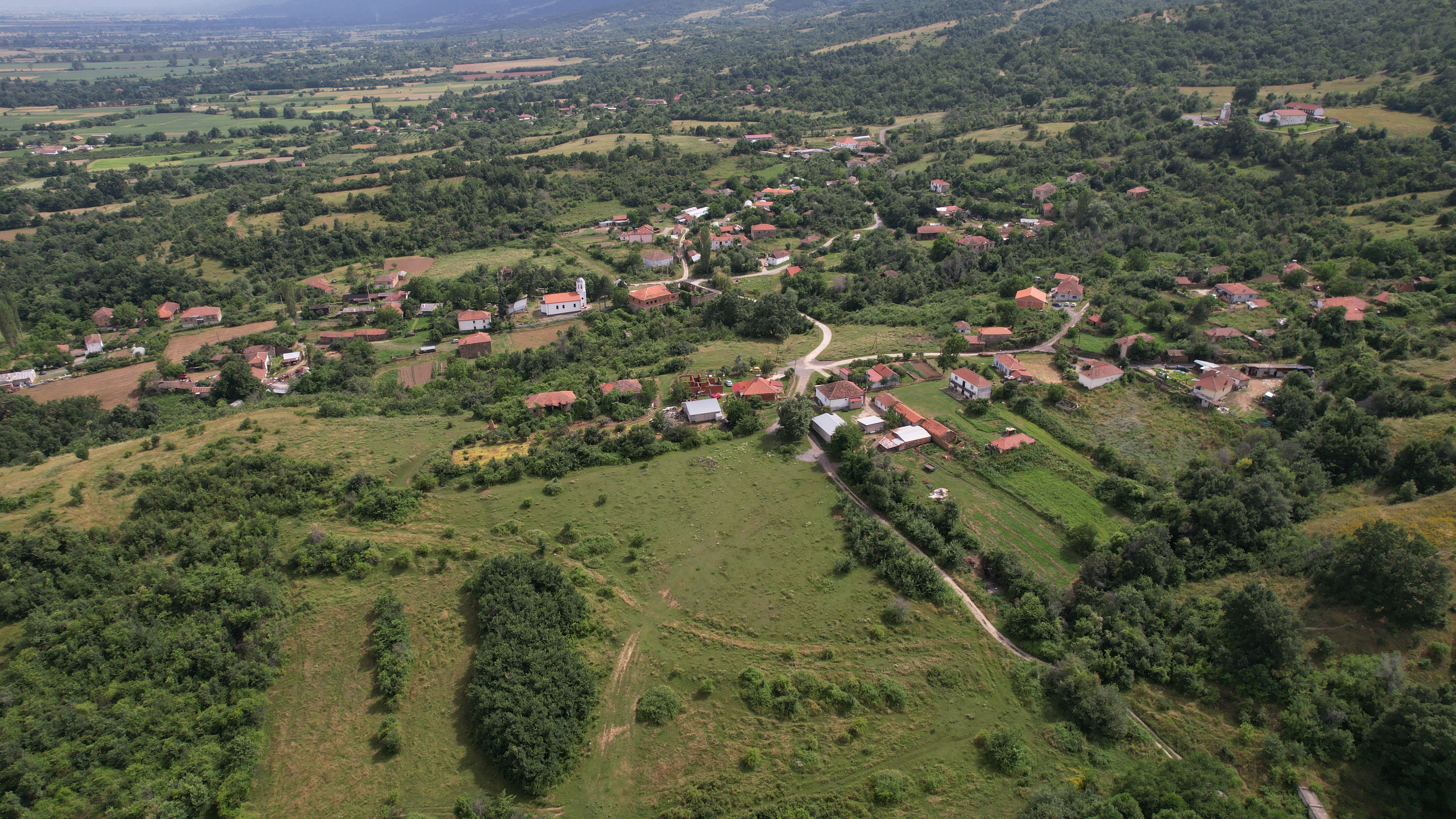
- Air view of the village

- Location within North Macedonia
- Country: North Macedonia
- Region: Pelagonia
- Municipality: Bitola

Population (2002)
  - Total: 205
- Time zone: UTC+1 (CET)
  - Summer (DST): UTC+2 (CEST)

Barešani (Macedonian Cyrillic: Барешани) is a village 8.88 kilometres (5.52 mi) away from Bitola, which is the second largest city in Republic of North Macedonia. It used to be part of the former municipality of Bistrica.

== Demographics ==
Barešani is attested in the Ottoman defter of 1467/68 as a village in the vilayet of Manastir. The majority of the inhabitants attested bore typical Slavic anthroponyms, with a minority also exhibiting Albanian anthroponyms, such as Todor Arnaut, Gjergj prift and Lazor son of Niksha.

According to the 2002 census, the village had a total of 205 inhabitants. Ethnic groups in the village include:

- Macedonians 204
- Others 1
