= Optičari =

Optičari Оптичари
- Village
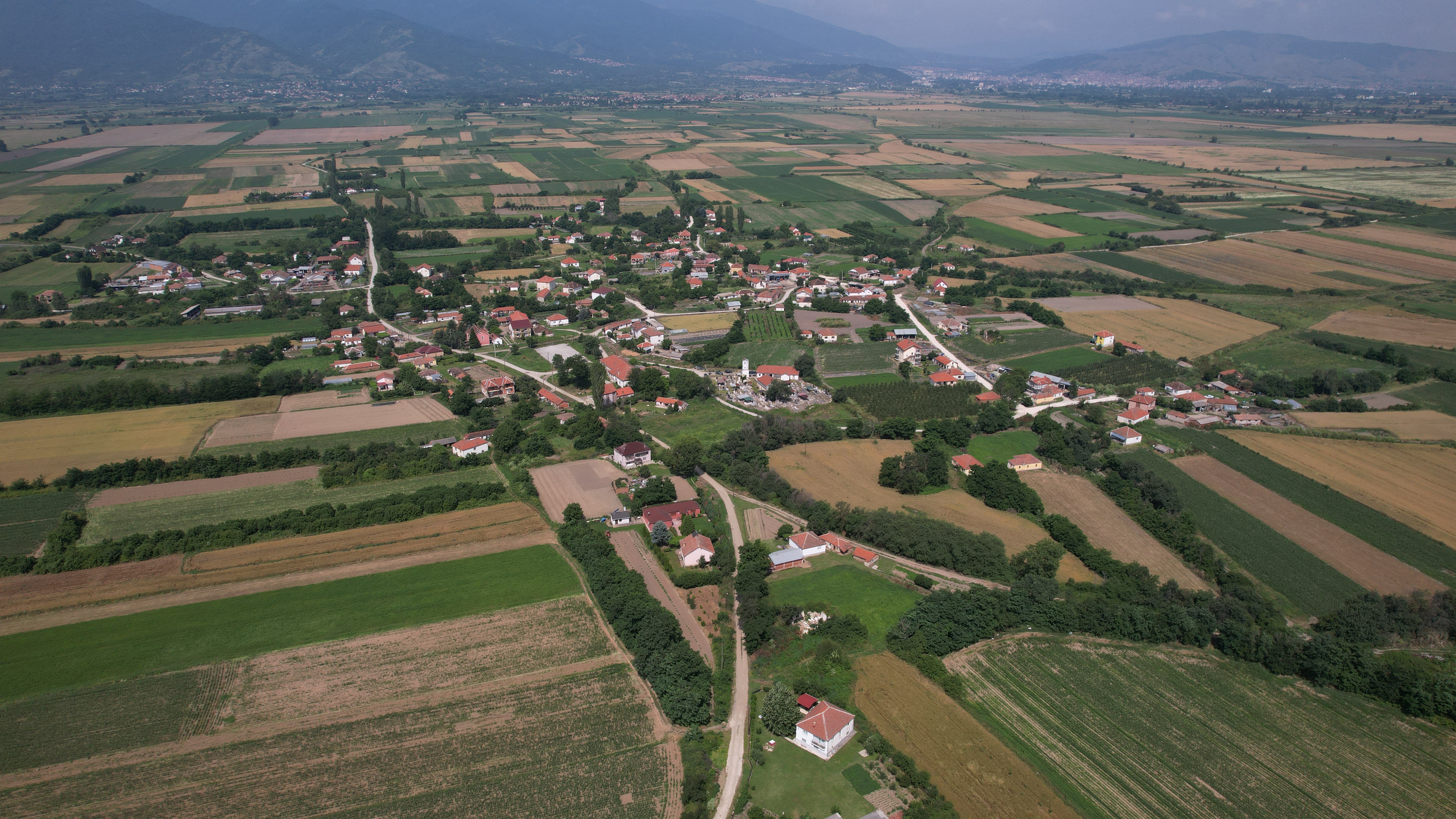
- Air view of the village

- Location within North Macedonia
- Country: North Macedonia
- Region: Pelagonia
- Municipality: Bitola

Population (2002)
  - Total: 317
- Time zone: UTC+1 (CET)
  - Summer (DST): UTC+2 (CEST)

Optičari (Macedonian Cyrillic: Оптичари) is a village 8.58 kilometres (5.33 mi) away from Bitola, which is the second-largest city in North Macedonia. It used to be part of the former municipality of Bistrica.

== Demographics ==
According to the 1467-68 Ottoman defter, the inhabitants of Optičari bore a mixed Slav-Albanian anthroponomy - usually a Slavic first name and an Albanian last name or last names with Albanian patronyms and Slavic suffixes.

According to the 2002 census, the village had a total of 317 inhabitants. Ethnic groups in the village include:

- Macedonians 316
- Serbs 1
