= Dolno Egri =

Dolno Egri Долно Егри
- Village
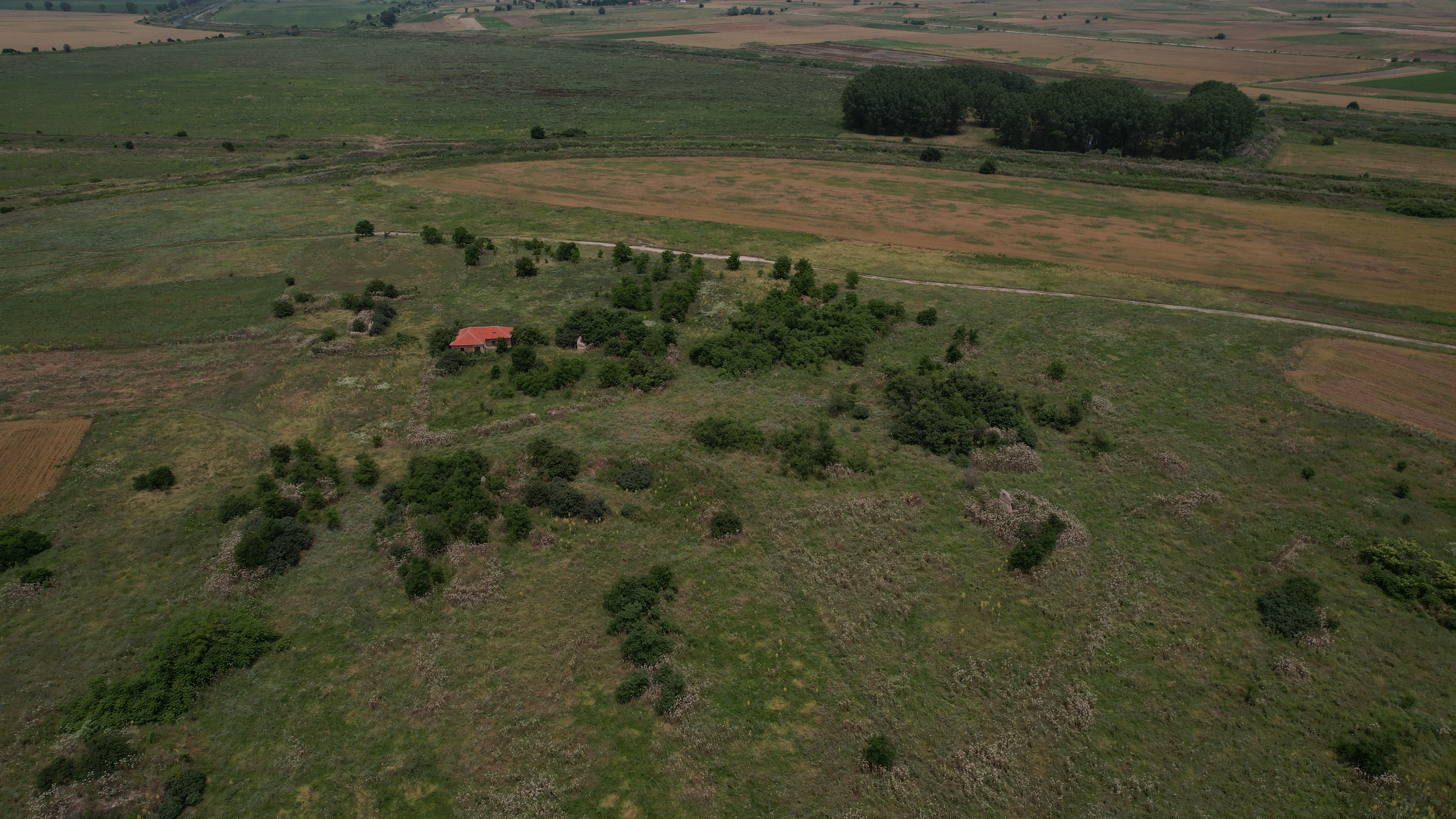
- Air view of the village

- Location within North Macedonia
- Coordinates: 40°57′56.78″N 21°29′11.21″E
- Country: North Macedonia
- Region: Pelagonia
- Municipality: Bitola

Population (2002)
  - Total: 0
- Time zone: UTC+1 (CET)
  - Summer (DST): UTC+2 (CEST)

Dolno Egri (Macedonian: Долно Егри) is a village in the Bitola Municipality of North Macedonia. It used to be part of the former municipality of Bistrica.

According to the 2002 census, it has a population of 0. Ethnic groups in the village include:
