= Lopatica, Bitola =

Lopatica Лопатица
- Village
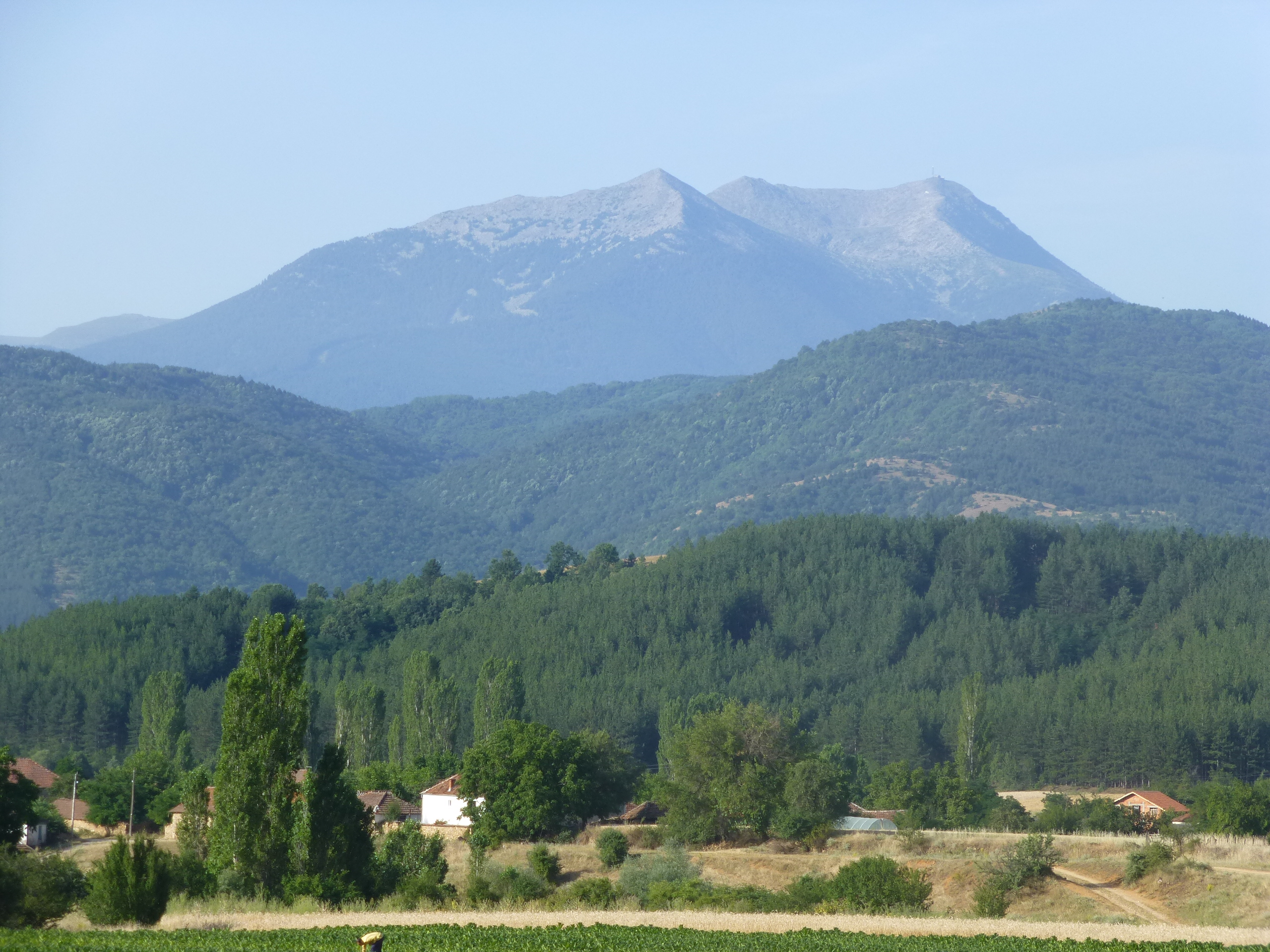

- Location within North Macedonia
- Country: North Macedonia
- Region: Pelagonia
- Municipality: Bitola

Population (2002)
  - Total: 280
- Time zone: UTC+1 (CET)
  - Summer (DST): UTC+2 (CEST)

Lopatica (Macedonian: Лопатица) is a village in the Bitola Municipality of North Macedonia. It used to be part of the former municipality of Kukurečani.

== Demographics ==
According to the 2002 census, the village had a total of 280 inhabitants. Ethnic groups in the village include:

- Macedonians 280
