= Medžitlija =

Medžitlija Меџитлија Mexhitli
- Village
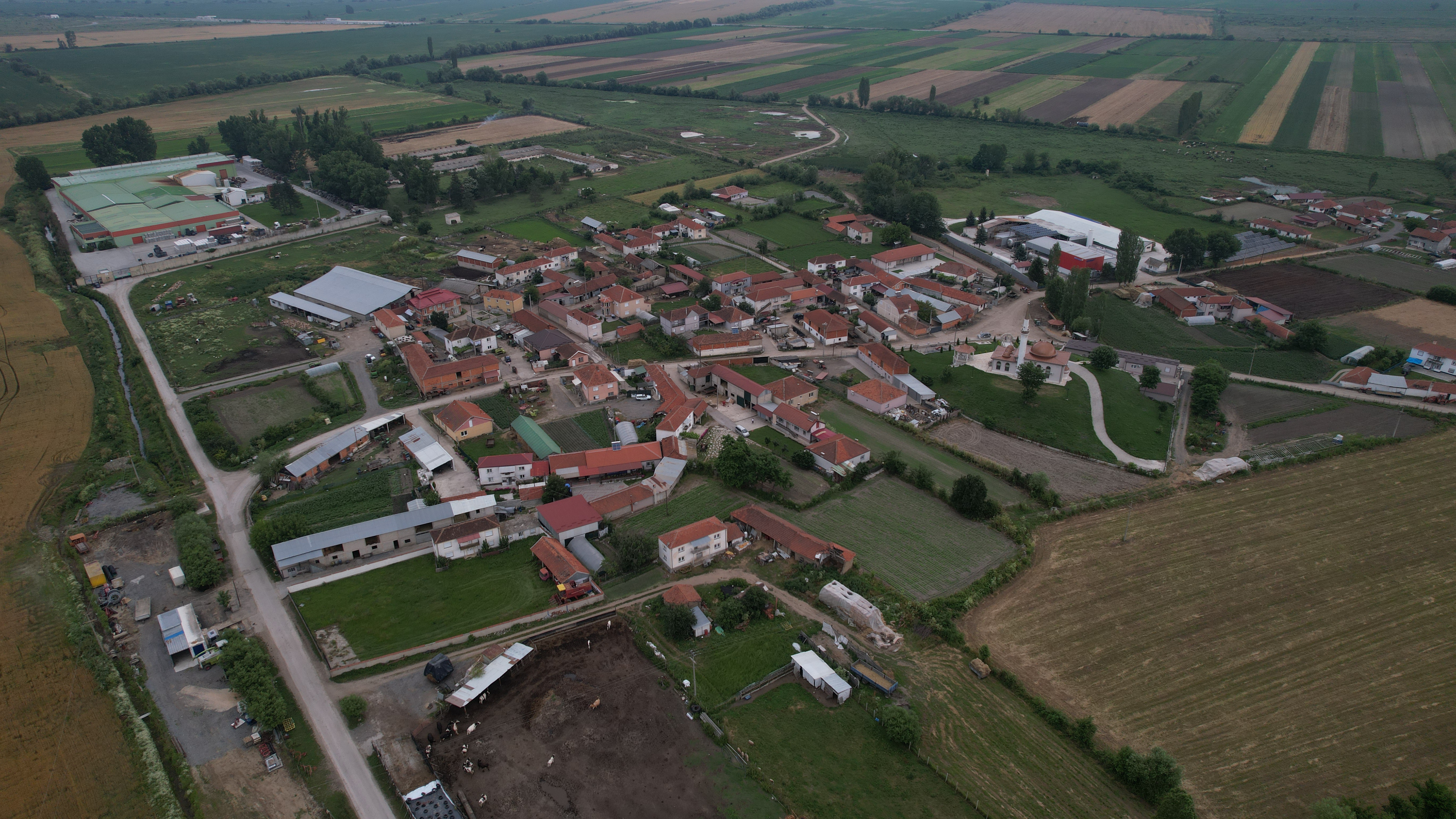
- Air view of the village

- Location within North Macedonia
- Coordinates: 40°55′46″N 21°25′45″E
- Country: North Macedonia
- Region: Pelagonia
- Municipality: Bitola
- Elevation: 584 m (1,916 ft)

Population (2002)
  - Total: 155
- Time zone: UTC+1 (CET)
  - Summer (DST): UTC+2 (CEST)
- Postal code: 7223
- Area code: +389 047
- Car plates: BT
- Website: .

Medžitlija (Macedonian: Меџитлија, Albanian: Mexhitli) is a village in the municipality of Bitola, North Macedonia, along the border with Greece. It was previously part of the former municipality of Bistrica. The village is located 14 km south of Bitola at the Medžitlija-Níki border crossing.

== History ==
In the early Ottoman period, Medžitlija was one of several villages in the Pelagonia plain settled by nomadic Turkomen tribes from Anatolia during 1475–1543. In the modern era, following the migration of the village Turkish population, Albanians from nearby mountainous areas settled in Medžitlija from the mid 1950s onward. In the early twenty first century, a new mosque was built in Medžitlija and financed by the wealthy Sulejmani family from the Albanian diaspora in Australia.

== Demographics ==
According to the 2002 census, the village had a total of 155 inhabitants. Ethnic groups in the village include:

- Albanians 154
- Macedonians 1
