= Bitola Municipality =

Municipality of North Macedonia

Municipality of Bitola Општина Битола
- Urban municipality
- Flag Coat of arms

- Coordinates: 41°2′N 21°20′E
- Country: North Macedonia
- Region: Pelagonia
- Municipal seat: Bitola

Government
  - Mayor: Toni Konjanovski (VMRO-DPMNE)

Area
  - Total: 787.95 km^{2} (304.23 sq mi)

Population
  - Total: 85,164
  - Density: 108.08/km^{2} (279.93/sq mi)
- Time zone: UTC+1 (CET)
- Postal code: 7000
- Area code: 047
- Vehicle registration: BT
- Website: http://www.bitola.gov.mk

Bitola (Macedonian: Битола [ˈbitɔɫa]) is a municipality in the southern part of North Macedonia. Bitola is also the name of the city where the municipal seat is located. The municipality is located in the Pelagonia Statistical Region.

== Geography ==
The municipality of Bitola borders the Demir Hisar Municipality to the north, the Mogila Municipality to the northeast, the Resen Municipality to the west, the Novaci Municipality to the southeast and Greece to the south.

The municipality extends through the Pelagonia Valley, reaching the highest points of the Baba Mountain. The Black River runs through the municipality.

== Demographics ==
In 2002 the population of the municipality together with Mogila and Novaci was 105,644.

By the 2003 territorial division of the Republic, the rural Bistrica Municipality and Capari Municipality were annexed to the Bitola Municipality. Without these two municipalities the population of the municipality was 86,176, according to the national census of 1994, and 86,480 at the last census. The population of the defunct Bistrica Municipality in 1994 was 5,779, and according to the last census was 5,042. The population of the former Capari Municipality in 1994 was 1,793, and according to the last census was 1,424.

	2002		2021	
	Number	%	Number	%
TOTAL	95,385	100	85,164	100
Macedonians	84,616	88.71	69,182	81.23
Albanians	4,164	4.37	4,018	4.72
Roma	2,613	2.74	2,890	3.39
Vlachs	1,270	1.33	1,205	1.41
Turks	1,610	1.69	1,174	1.38
Serbs	541	0.57	359	0.42
Bosniaks	21	0.02	49	0.05
Other / Undeclared / Unknown	550	0.57	782	0.94
Persons for whom data are taken from administrative sources			5,505	6.46

== Inhabited places ==
The number of inhabited places in the municipality is 69. There is one city and 68 villages.

Inhabited Places	Total	Macedonians	Albanians	Turks	Roma	Vlachs	Serbs	Bosnians	Others
Bitola Municipality	85,164	69,182	4,018	1,174	2,890	1,205	359	49	6,287
Bitola	69287	55995	2441	1115	2862	1003	321	47	4774
Barešani	146	115	1	0	0	0	0	0	30
Bistrica	734	660	43	0	0	1	6	1	20
Bratin Dol	168	120	34	0	0	6	0	4	4
Brusnik	190	179	0	0	0	0	1	1	9
Bukovo	1125	1023	18	22	0	0	4	3	54
Velušina	165	37	109	0	7	0	0	1	11
Gabalavci	69	60	0	0	0	0	0	0	9
Gopesh	1	0	0	0	0	1	0	0	0
Gorno Egri	0	0	0	0	0	0	0	0	0
Gorno Orizari	2521	2442	1	2	4	11	8	0	49
Graeshnica	202	7	190	0	0	0	0	0	5
Dihovo	213	192	0	0	0	1	2	0	17
Dolenci	236	30	200	1	0	0	0	1	4
Dolno Egri	0	0	0	0	0	0	0	0	0
Dolno Orizari	1734	1590	0	0	0	6	2	9	127
Dragarino	84	77	0	0	0	0	0	0	7
Dragožani	117	112	3	0	0	0	0	0	2
Dragosh	10	9	0	0	0	0	0	0	1
Drevenik	3	0	0	0	0	0	0	0	3
Gjavato	35	34	0	0	0	0	0	0	1
Žabeni	144	14	120	0	0	0	0	0	10
Zlokukjani	0	0	0	0	0	0	0	0	0
Kažani	31	21	8	2	0	0	0	0	0
Kanino	104	89	0	0	0	0	0	0	15
Karamani	290	283	0	0	0	0	1	2	4
Kišava	185	0	169	0	0	0	0	0	16
Kravari	819	778	2	4	0	0	0	4	31
Kremenica	100	78	3	9	2	0	4	0	4
Krklino	564	549	3	0	0	0	1	3	8
Krstoar	239	200	21	5	0	0	2	0	11
Kukurečani	784	730	5	0	15	0	1	0	33
Lavci	291	273	0	0	0	2	0	1	15
Lažec	228	105	117	0	0	0	0	0	6
Lera	110	16	94	0	0	0	0	0	0
Lisolaj	163	153	0	0	0	0	0	0	10
Logovardi	577	541	1	8	0	0	2	0	25
Lopatica	212	211	0	0	0	0	0	0	1
Magarevo	81	60	0	0	0	16	0	2	3
Malovishte	50	2	0	0	0	44	0	0	4
Metimir	0	0	0	0	0	0	0	0	0
Medžitlija	156	0	154	0	0	0	0	0	2
Nižepole	125	21	12	4	0	77	0	5	6
Novo Zmirnovo	23	23	0	0	0	0	0	0	0
Oblakovo	0	0	0	0	0	0	0	0	0
Oleveni	146	133	3	0	0	0	1	4	5
Optičari	242	233	0	0	0	0	0	0	9
Orehovo	9	9	0	0	0	0	0	0	0
Ostrec	161	0	154	0	0	0	0	0	7
Poeševo	196	190	1	0	0	0	0	0	5
Porodin	139	110	17	0	0	0	1	0	11
Ramna	22	12	9	0	0	0	0	1	0
Rashtani	550	530	4	0	0	2	2	0	12
Rotino	93	91	0	0	0	0	0	0	2
Svinište	0	0	0	0	0	0	0	0	0
Sekirani	74	72	0	0	0	0	0	0	2
Snegovo	0	0	0	0	0	0	0	0	0
Sredno Egri	219	209	0	0	0	0	0	1	9
Srpci	45	39	0	0	0	0	0	0	6
Staro Zmirnovo	0	0	0	0	0	0	0	0	0
Streževo	0	0	0	0	0	0	0	0	0
Trn	87	79	0	0	0	0	0	0	8
Trnovo	263	130	69	2	0	34	0	1	27
Capari	307	284	0	0	0	1	0	1	21
Crnobuki	264	218	0	0	0	0	0	0	46
Crnovec	31	14	12	0	0	0	0	0	5
