= Gorno Orizari, Bitola =

Gorno Orizari Горно Оризари
- Village
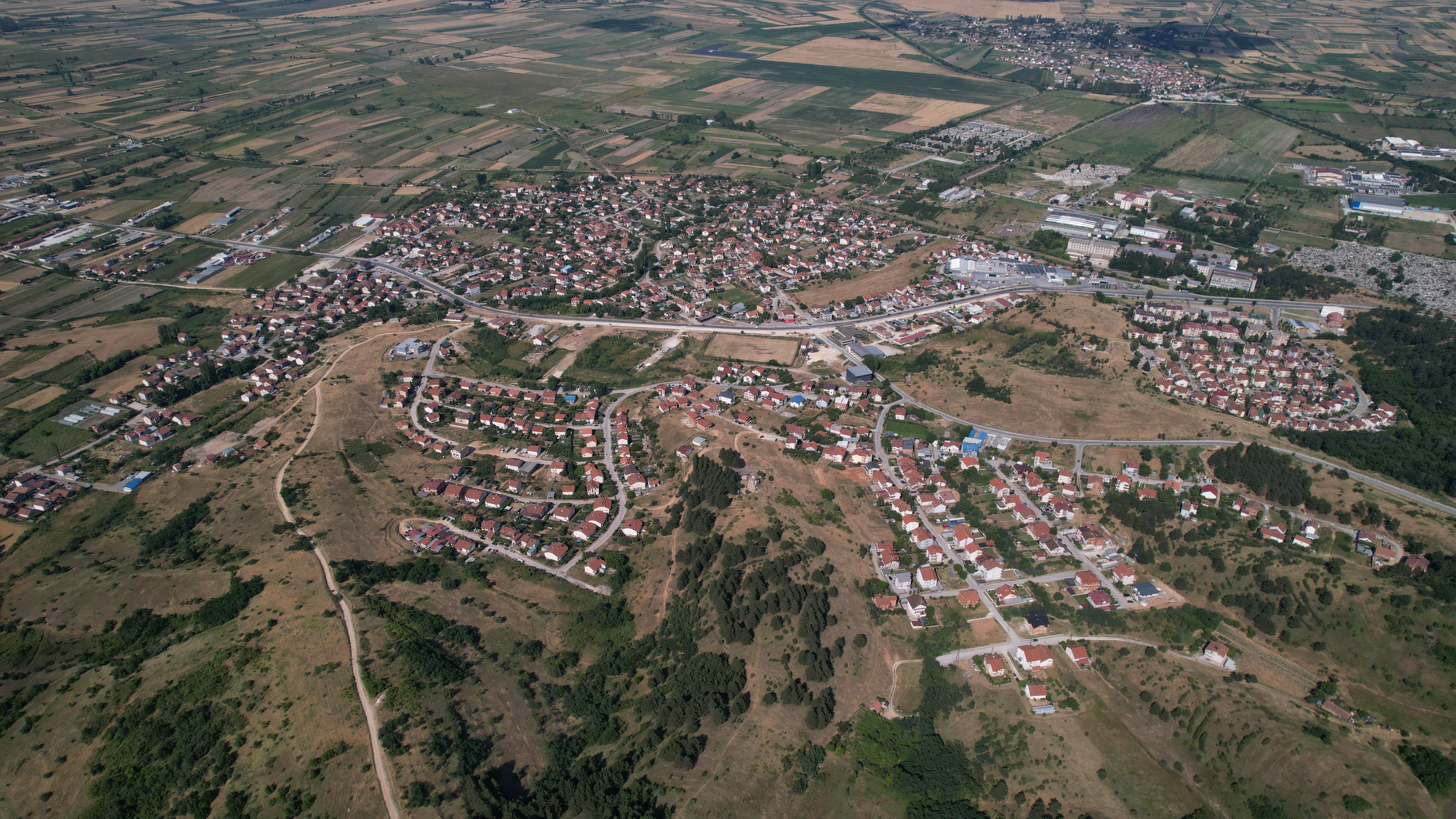
- Air view of the village

- Location within North Macedonia
- Country: North Macedonia
- Region: Pelagonia
- Municipality: Bitola

Population (2021)
  - Total: 2,521
- Time zone: UTC+1 (CET)
  - Summer (DST): UTC+2 (CEST)

Gorno Orizari (Macedonian: Горно Оризари) is a settlement within the Bitola Municipality of North Macedonia. Originally a village, it is now a suburb of the wider city. It is located to the north of the city, east of the exit road for Prilep and close to the proposed M5 motorway, a limited-access road that bypasses Bitola linking the city with Ohrid and Resen (west) and Prilep (north).

== History ==
The village was founded in the 19th century during the time of the Ottoman Empire. In 1900, the population of Gorno Orizari was 236, every one Orthodox Christian, and declaring Bulgarian ethnicity.

== Demographics ==
As of the 2021 census, Gorno Orizari had 2,521 residents with the following ethnic composition:

- Macedonians 2,442
- Persons for whom data are taken from administrative sources 49
- Vlachs 11
- Others 11
- Serbs 8

The village grew throughout the 20th century and at the 2002 census, the population had reach 2,454 though now there in an absolute Macedonian majority. Ethnic groups in the village include:

- Macedonians 2,431
- Serbs 3
- Romani 13
- Aromanians 1
- Others 6
