= Raštani, Bitola =

Raštani Раштани
- Village
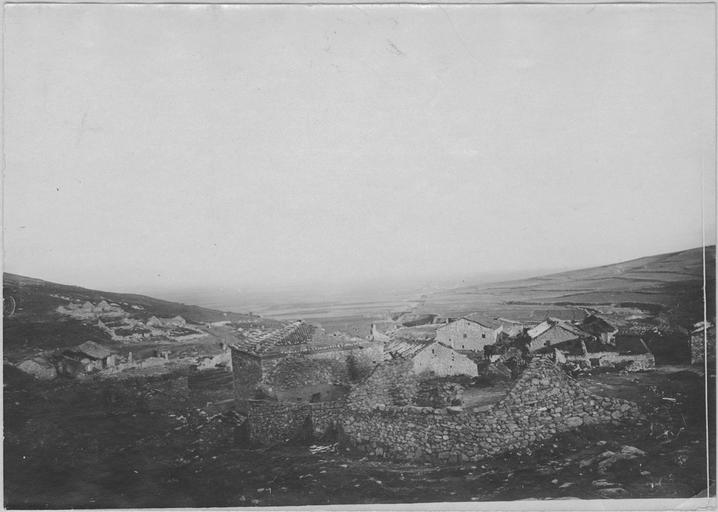
- Raštani in 1917

- Location within North Macedonia
- Country: North Macedonia
- Region: Pelagonia
- Municipality: Bitola

Population (2021)
  - Total: 550
- Time zone: UTC+1 (CET)
  - Summer (DST): UTC+2 (CEST)

Raštani (Macedonian Cyrillic: Раштани) is a village 2.49 kilometres (1.55 mi) away from Bitola, which is the second-largest city in North Macedonia.

== Demographics ==
Raštani is attested in the Ottoman defter of 1467/68 as a village in the vilayet of Manastir. The inhabitants attested primarily bore a mixture of Christian Albanian and Slavic anthroponyms, such as Rajko, son of Gjon.

As of the 2021 census, Raštani had 550 residents with the following ethnic composition:

- Macedonians 530
- Persons for whom data are taken from administrative sources 12
- Albanians 4
- Others 4

According to the 2002 census, the village had a total of 396 inhabitants. Ethnic groups in the village include:

- Macedonians 391
- Aromanians 3
- Others 2
