= Bratin Dol =

Bratin Dol Братин Дол Bratindoll
- Village
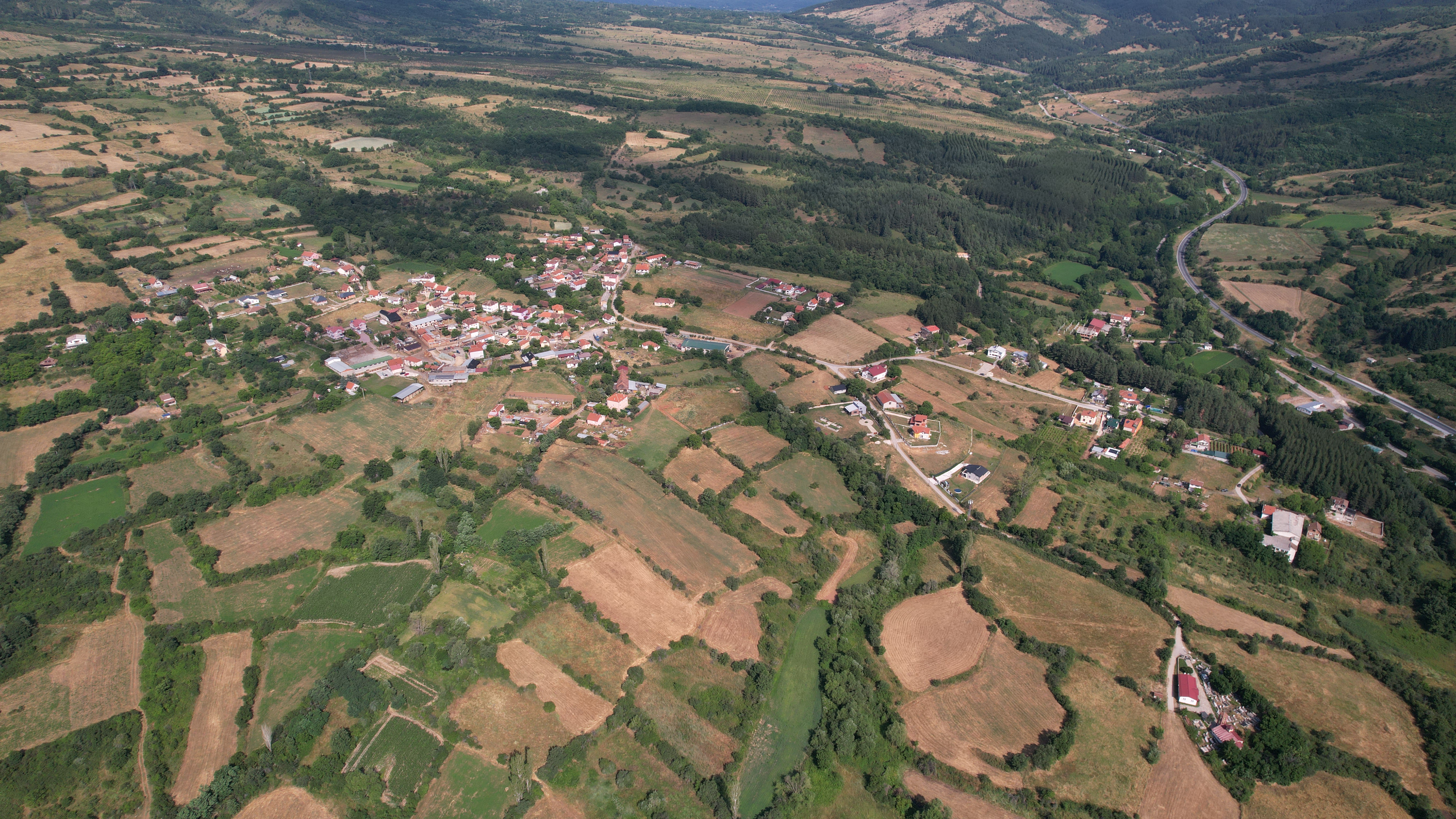
- Air view of the village

- Location within North Macedonia
- Coordinates: 41°03′17.08″N 21°15′39.41″E
- Country: North Macedonia
- Region: Pelagonia
- Municipality: Bitola

Population (2002)
  - Total: 185
- Time zone: UTC+1 (CET)
  - Summer (DST): UTC+2 (CEST)
- Car plates: BT
- Website: .

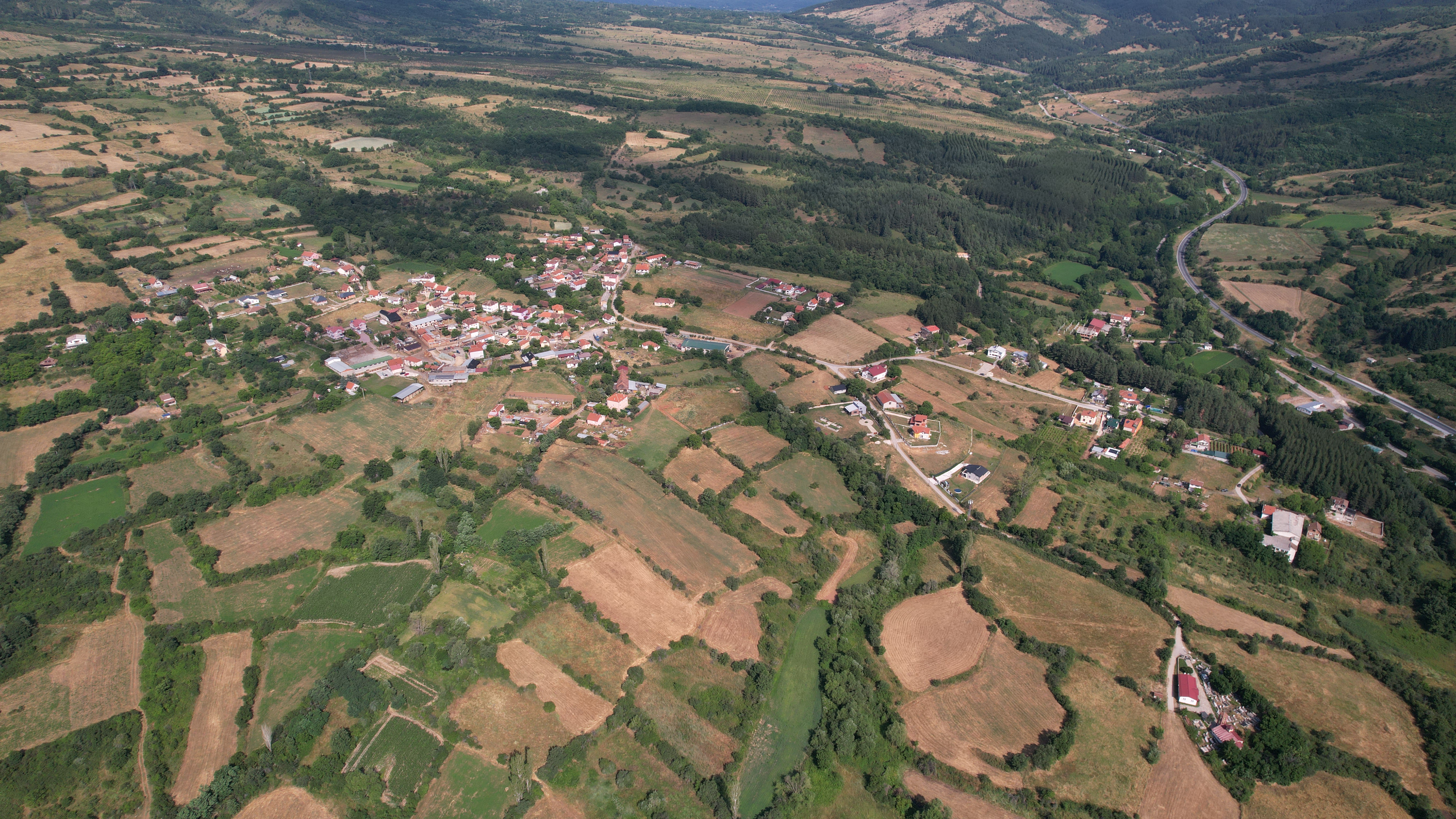
An aerial view of the village of Bratin Dol

Bratin Dol (Macedonian: Братин Дол, Albanian: Bratindoll) is a village in the municipality of Bitola, North Macedonia.

== History ==
Bratin Dol is not attested in the Ottoman 1467–1468 defter (tax registry) of the vilayet of Manastir, nor the 1568–1569 defter. According to Qemal Murati (2022), there were some heads of households in the village that were of Albanian origin some time in the 15th–16th centuries, though no defter is referenced.

== Demographics ==
The Albanian population of Bratin Dol are Tosks, a subgroup of southern Albanians. In statistics gathered in 1900, the village of Bratin Dol was inhabited by 150 Albanian Muslims and 100 Macedonian Christians. According to the 2002 census, the village had a total of 185 inhabitants. Ethnic groups in the village include:

- Macedonians 146
- Albanians 33
- Vlachs 3
- Others 3

== Sources ==
- Stojanovski, Aleksandar (1971). Турски документи за историјата на македонскиот народ: Опширен пописен дефтер бр. 4 : (1467-1468 година). архив на Македонија.
- Stojanovski, Aleksandar (2008). Турски документи за историјата на македонскиот народ: Опширен пописен дефтер 1568-69 година. архив на Македонија.
- Trifunoski, Jovan F. (1998). Битољско-Прилепска котлина: антропогеографска проучавања (1914-1997). Српска академија наука и уметности.
