= Kažani =

Kažani Кажани Kazhanjë
- Village
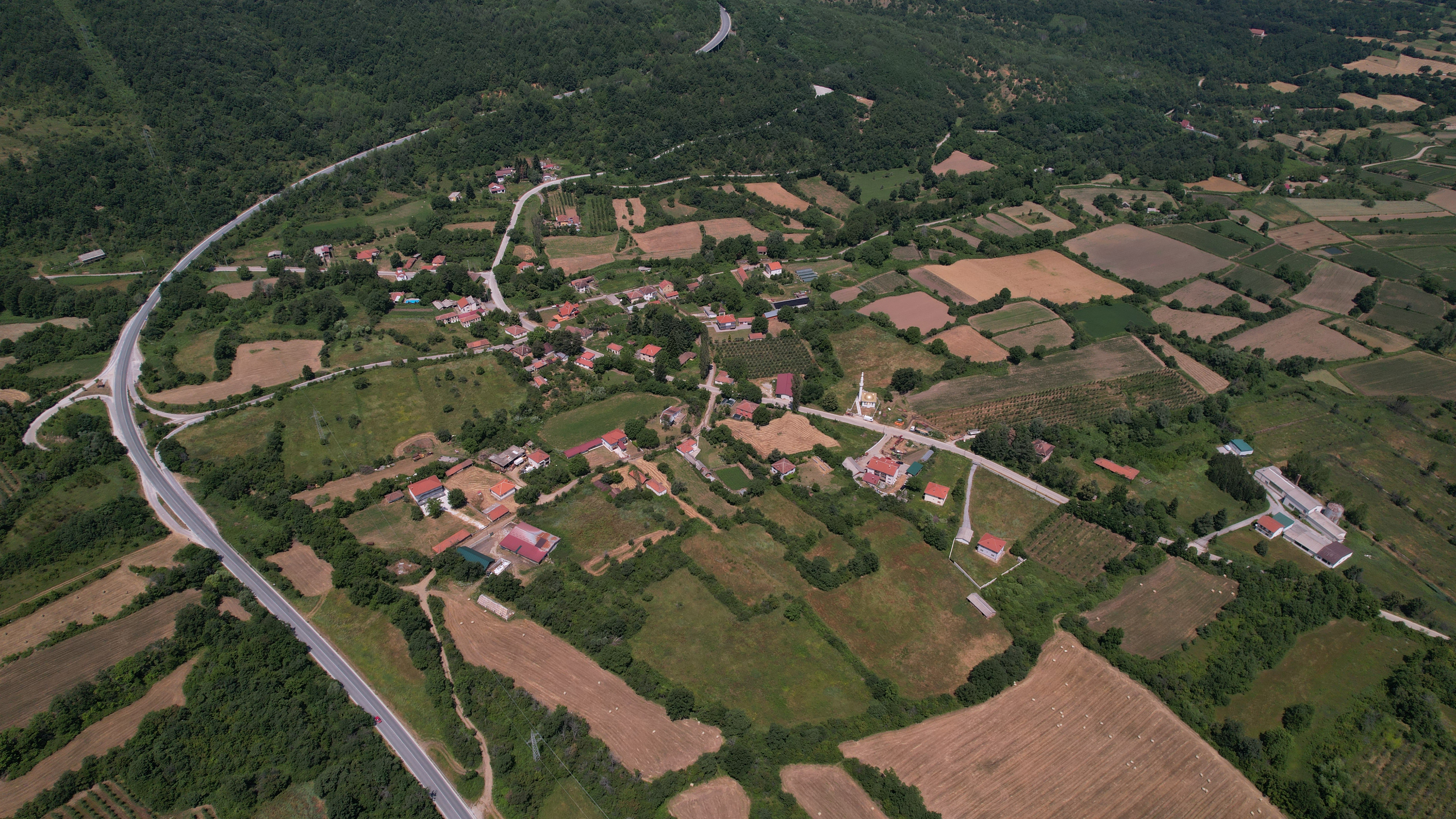
- Air view of the village

- Location within North Macedonia
- Coordinates: 41°04′N 21°09′E
- Country: North Macedonia
- Region: Pelagonia
- Municipality: Bitola

Population (2002)
  - Total: 75
- Time zone: UTC+1 (CET)
  - Summer (DST): UTC+2 (CEST)
- Car plates: BT
- Website: .

Kažani (Macedonian: Кажани, Albanian: Kazhanjë) is a village in the municipality of Bitola, North Macedonia. It used to be part of the former municipality of Capari.

== Demographics ==
The Albanian population of Kažani are Tosks, a subgroup of southern Albanians. In statistics gathered by Vasil Kanchov in 1900, the village of Kažani was inhabited by 450 Muslim Albanians and 65 Bulgarians. In 1905 in statistics gathered by Dimitar Mishev Brancoff, Kažani was inhabited by 480 Muslim Albanians and 56 Bulgarian Exarchists. According to the 2002 census, the village had a total of 75 inhabitants. Ethnic groups in the village include:

- Macedonians 59
- Albanians 13
- Turks 2
- Others 1
