= Krstoar =

Krstoar Крстоар Kërstoari
- Village
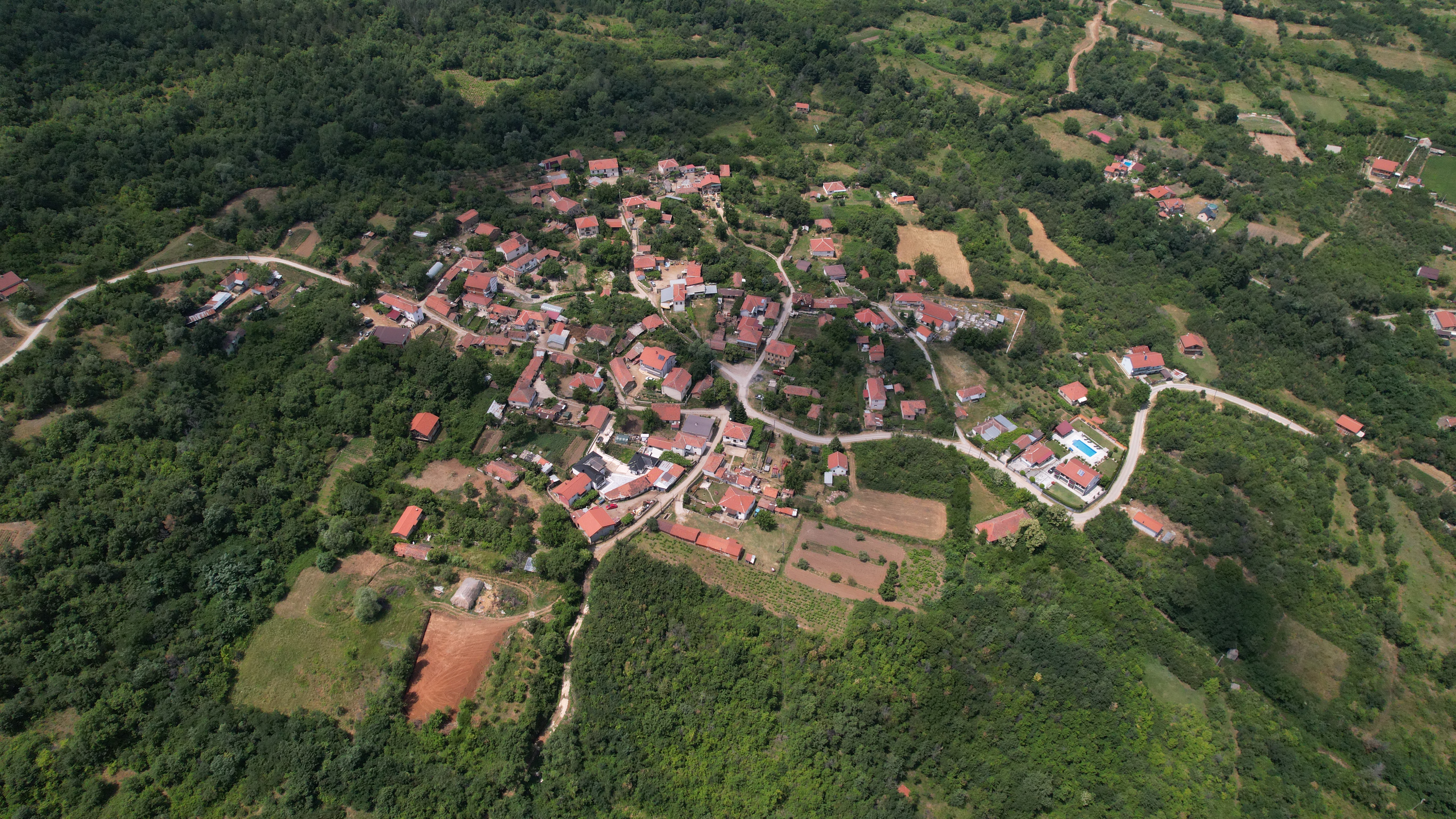
- Air view of the village

- Location within North Macedonia
- Country: North Macedonia
- Region: Pelagonia
- Municipality: Bitola

Population (2021)
  - Total: 239
- Time zone: UTC+1 (CET)
  - Summer (DST): UTC+2 (CEST)

Krstoar (Macedonian Cyrillic: Крстоари) is a village 4.51 kilometres (2.80 mi) away from Bitola, which is the second-largest city in North Macedonia. It used to be part of the former municipality of Bistrica.

== Name ==
The village is known as Kërstoari in Albanian.

== Demographics ==
Krstoar is attested in the Ottoman defter of 1467/68 as a village in the vilayet of Manastir. The inhabitants attested almost entirely bore typical Slavic anthroponyms, with one instance of the Albanian anthroponym Gjon (son of Janko) also present.

As of the 2021 census, Krstoar had 239 residents with the following ethnic composition:

- Macedonians 200
- Albanians 21
- Persons for whom data are taken from administrative sources 11
- Turks 5
- Serbs 2

According to the 2002 census, the village had a total of 167 inhabitants. Ethnic groups in the village include:

- Macedonians 164
- Serbs 2
- Others 1

=== Families ===
Krstoar is a Macedonian village. In 1951, families in village are:

Gjorevci (11 houses in village), Jonovci (8 houses), Kundevci (7 houses), Josifovci (3 houses), Cancukovci (3 houses), Mockovci (2 houses), Kotevi (2 houses) and Geldanovci (1 house) all of them natives in village; Sitnovci (4 houses) they settled from somewhere in 18 century; Vidinovci (8 houses) settled from Prespa; Gulevci (8 houses) settled from Albania; Mosheni (4 houses) settled from village Setina, near Florina; Domazetovci (2 houses) settled from Klobucista near Florina; Trifunovci (2 houses) settled from village Bukovo; Apostolovci (1 house) and Petrevci (1 house) settled from elsewhere; Milosevci (2 houses) settled after 1913 from Prespa, Ristovi (1 house) settled from Bitola.
