= Snegovo =

Snegovo Снегово Snegovë
- Village
- Location within North Macedonia
- Coordinates: 41°04′N 21°18′E
- Country: North Macedonia
- Region: Pelagonia
- Municipality: Bitola

Population (2002)
  - Total: 0
- Time zone: UTC+1 (CET)
  - Summer (DST): UTC+2 (CEST)
- ISO 3166 code: MKD
- Car plates: BT
- Website: .

Snegovo (Macedonian: Снегово, Albanian: Snegovë) is an abandoned village in the municipality of Bitola, North Macedonia.

== Demographics ==
Snegovo is attested in the Ottoman defter of 1467/68 as a village in the vilayet of Manastir. The inhabitants attested largely bore Albanian anthroponyms, such as Gon brother of Kosta, Kojo son of Arbanash and Gin, the priest of the village.

The village of Snegovo, when inhabited in the past was traditionally and exclusively populated by Muslim Albanians.

In statistics gathered by Vasil Kanchov in 1900, the village of Snegovo was inhabited by 45 Muslim Albanians.

According to the 2002 census, the village had a total of 0 inhabitants.
