= Svinište =

Village in North Macedonia

Svinište Свиниште
- Village
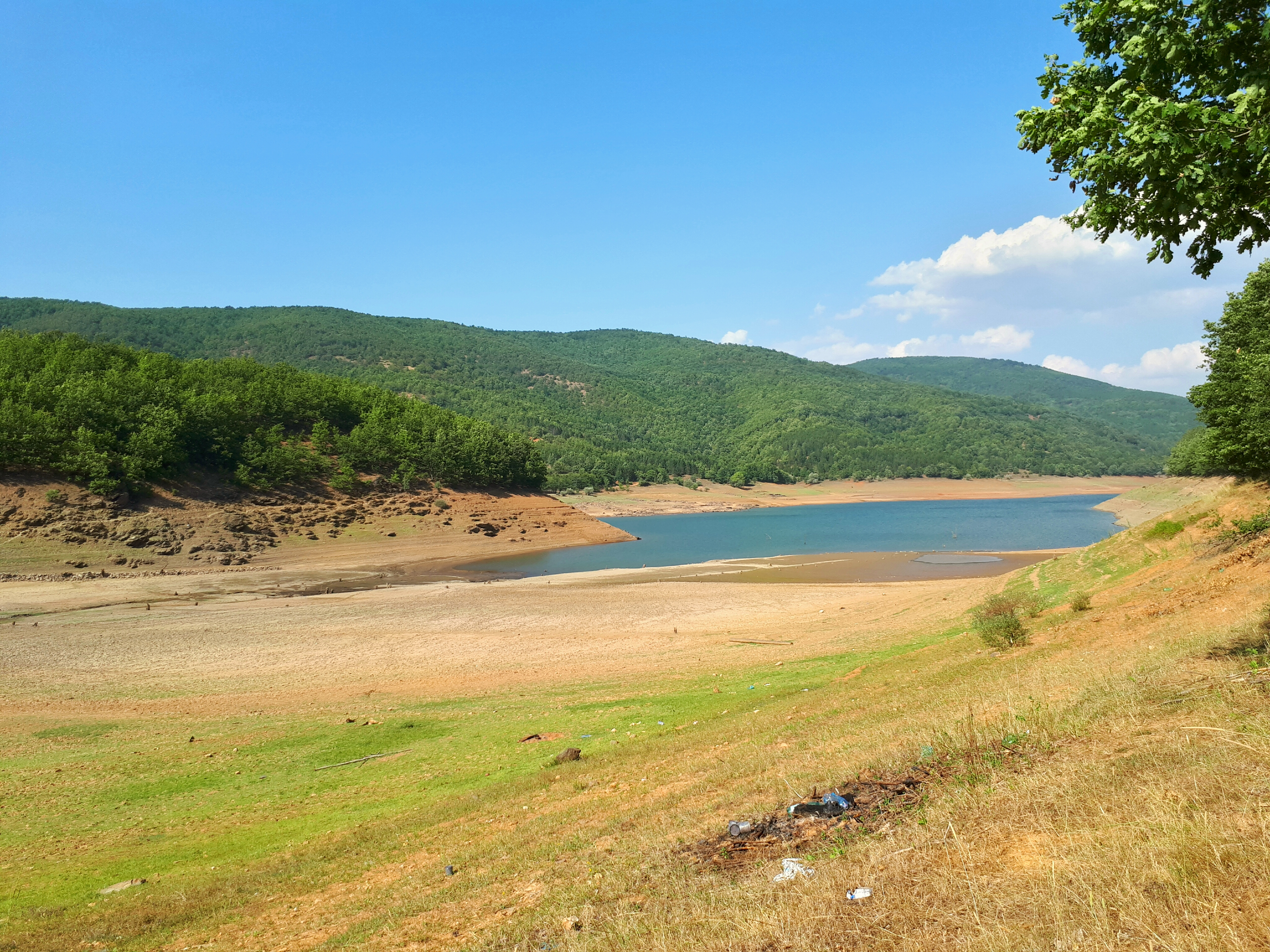
- Former area of the village

- Location within North Macedonia
- Country: North Macedonia
- Region: Pelagonia
- Municipality: Bitola

Population (2002)
  - Total: 0
- Time zone: UTC+1 (CET)
  - Summer (DST): UTC+2 (CEST)

Sviniste (Macedonian: Свиниште) is an abandoned village in the Bitola Municipality of North Macedonia. It used to be part of the former municipality of Capari.

== Demographics ==
According to the 2002 census, the village had a total of 0 inhabitants.
