= Krklino =

Krklino Крклино
- Village
- Location within North Macedonia
- Country: North Macedonia
- Region: Pelagonia
- Municipality: Bitola

Population (2002)
  - Total: 611
- Time zone: UTC+1 (CET)
  - Summer (DST): UTC+2 (CEST)

Krklino (Macedonian: Крклино) is a village in the Bitola Municipality of North Macedonia.

== Demographics ==
Krklino is attested in the Ottoman defter of 1467/68 as a village in the vilayet of Manastir. The inhabitants attested largely bore typical Slavic anthroponyms along with instances of Albanian ones: Turn Arbanash, Ivko, son of Gjon.

According to the 2002 census, the village had a total of 611 inhabitants. Ethnic groups in the village include:

- Macedonians 609
- Serbs 1
- Others 1
