= Dragoš, North Macedonia =

Dragoš Драгош
- Village
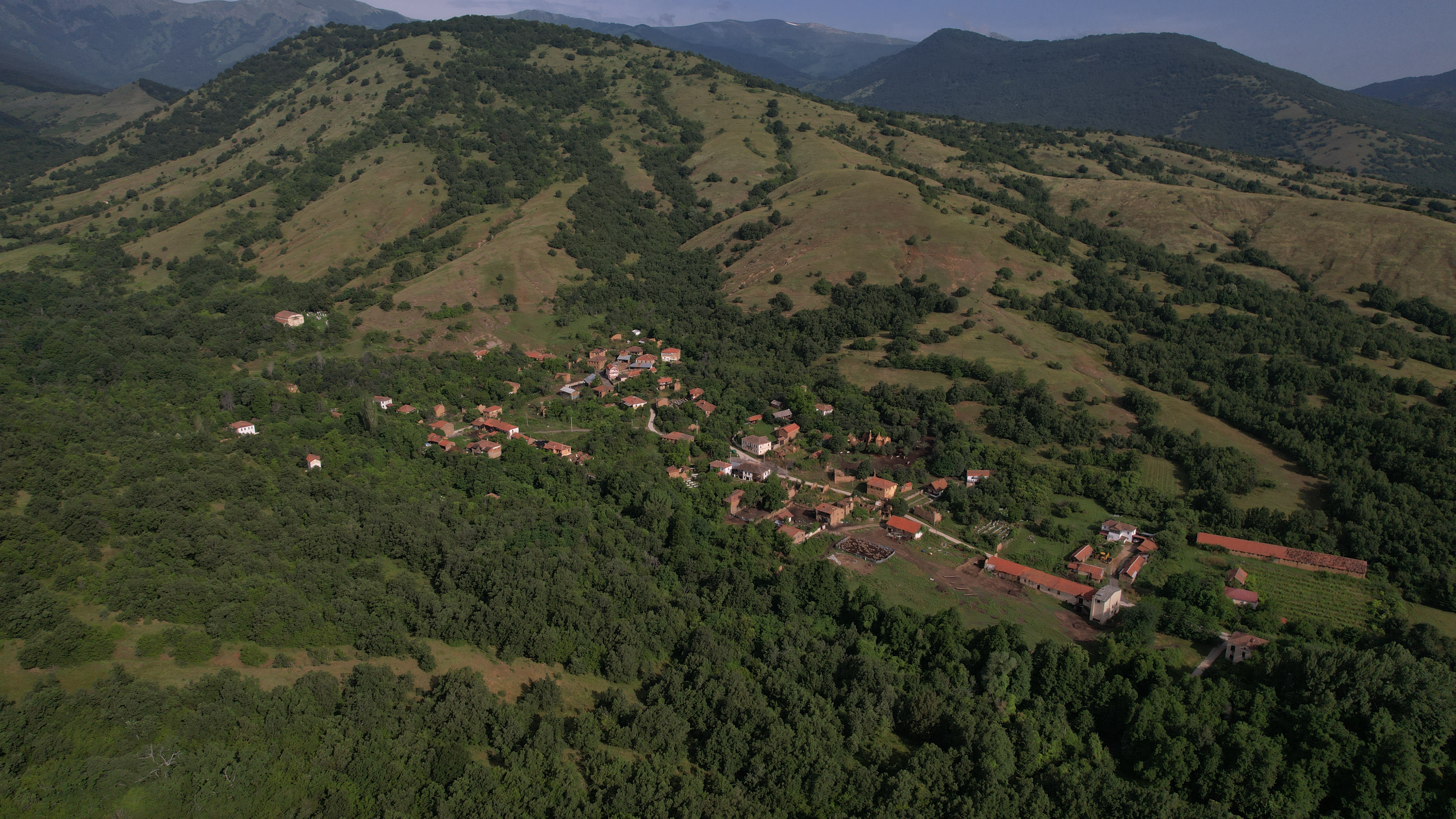
- Air view of the village

- Location within North Macedonia
- Country: North Macedonia
- Region: Pelagonia
- Municipality: Bitola

Population (2002)
  - Total: 33
- Time zone: UTC+1 (CET)
  - Summer (DST): UTC+2 (CEST)

Dragoš (Macedonian: Драгош) is a village in the Bitola Municipality of North Macedonia. It used to be part of the former municipality of Bistrica and is located close to the Greek border.

== Demographics ==
Dragoš is attested in the Ottoman defter of 1467/68 as a village in the vilayet of Manastir. The inhabitants attested largely bore typical Slavic anthroponyms along with instances of Albanian ones, such the priest Gjergj.

According to the 2002 census, the village had a total of 33 inhabitants. Ethnic groups in the village include:

- Macedonians 33
