= Dihovo =

- Village
- Дихово
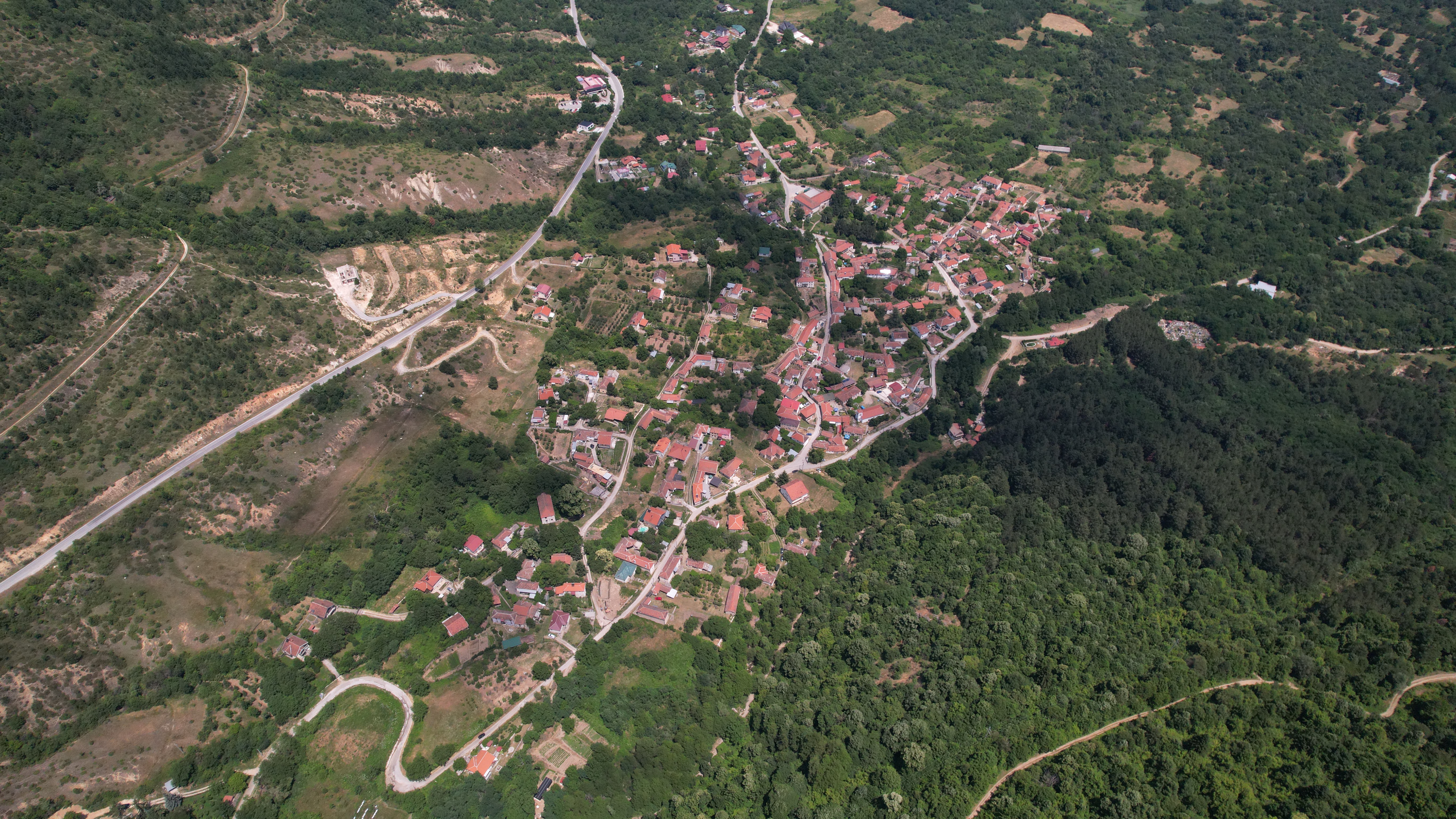
- Air view of the village

- Location within North Macedonia
- Coordinates: 41°02′N 21°16′E
- Country: North Macedonia
- Region: Pelagonia
- Municipality: Bitola

Population (2021)
  - Total: 213
- Time zone: UTC+1 (CET)
  - Summer (DST): UTC+2 (CEST)
- Car plates: BT
- Website: .

Dihovo (Macedonian: Дихово) is a village in the municipality of Bitola, North Macedonia located under Baba Mountain, about seven kilometers away from Bitola, the second largest city in the country.

== Demographics ==
Dihovo is attested in the Ottoman defter of 1467/68 as a village in the vilayet of Manastir. The inhabitants attested largely bore mixed Slavic-Albanian anthroponyms, such as Pejo son of Gerg, Dabzhiv Gugur, Dimitri, son of Grnçar, Andreja Martin etc.

In the early 19th century population of Dihovo was populated by Tosks, a subgroup of southern Albanians.

In statistics gathered by Vasil Kanchov in 1900, the village of Dihovo was inhabited by 200 Christian Bulgarians and 260 Muslim Albanians. According to the statistics of Bulgarian Exarchate secretary Dimitar Mishev (as D. M. Brancoff), the village had a total Christian population of 560 in 1905, of which all were Patriarchist Bulgarians. It also had 1 Greek school.

At the outbreak of the Balkan War in 1912, 3 people from Dihovo were volunteers in the Macedonian-Edirne militia. The village remained in Serbia after the Inter-Allied War in 1913.

In 1951, the families in village were:

- Plosnikovci (24 houses) the oldest family in the village, originally from the village of Ivanjevci
- Skubevci (14 houses) originally from the village of Lera, Bitola
- Toncevci (7 houses) originally from a village near Korçë in Albania. They think that their ancestors were orthodox Albanians, but mixed with orthodox Macedonians, and now speak only Macedonian
- Garagadzinja (5 houses) originally from the village of Gneotino
- Karafilovci (5 houses) originally from the village of Oreovo, near Bukovo
- Cvetkovi (3 houses) originally from the village of Drmeni in Prespa
- Prespani (5 houses) originally from the village of Brajcino in Prespa
- Jankulovci (2 houses)
- Janevci (13 houses)
- Gluvcevi (11 houses)
- Temelkovci (6 houses)
- Savini (6 houses)
- Bogojevci (5 houses)
- Vuckovi (5 houses)
- Kotovci (4 houses)
- Damevci (2 houses) all of them with unknown origin. All settled in Divovo in the 19th century.

In 1961, the village had 686 inhabitants.

According to the 2002 census, the village had a total of 310 inhabitants. Ethnic groups in the village include:

- Macedonians 305
- Serbs 3
- Others 2

According to the last census of 2021, 213 inhabitants lived in the village, of which 192 were Macedonians, 1 Aromanians, 2 Serbs, 1 other and 17 people without data with the following ethnic composition:
