= Gorno Egri =

Gorno Egri Горно Егри
- Village
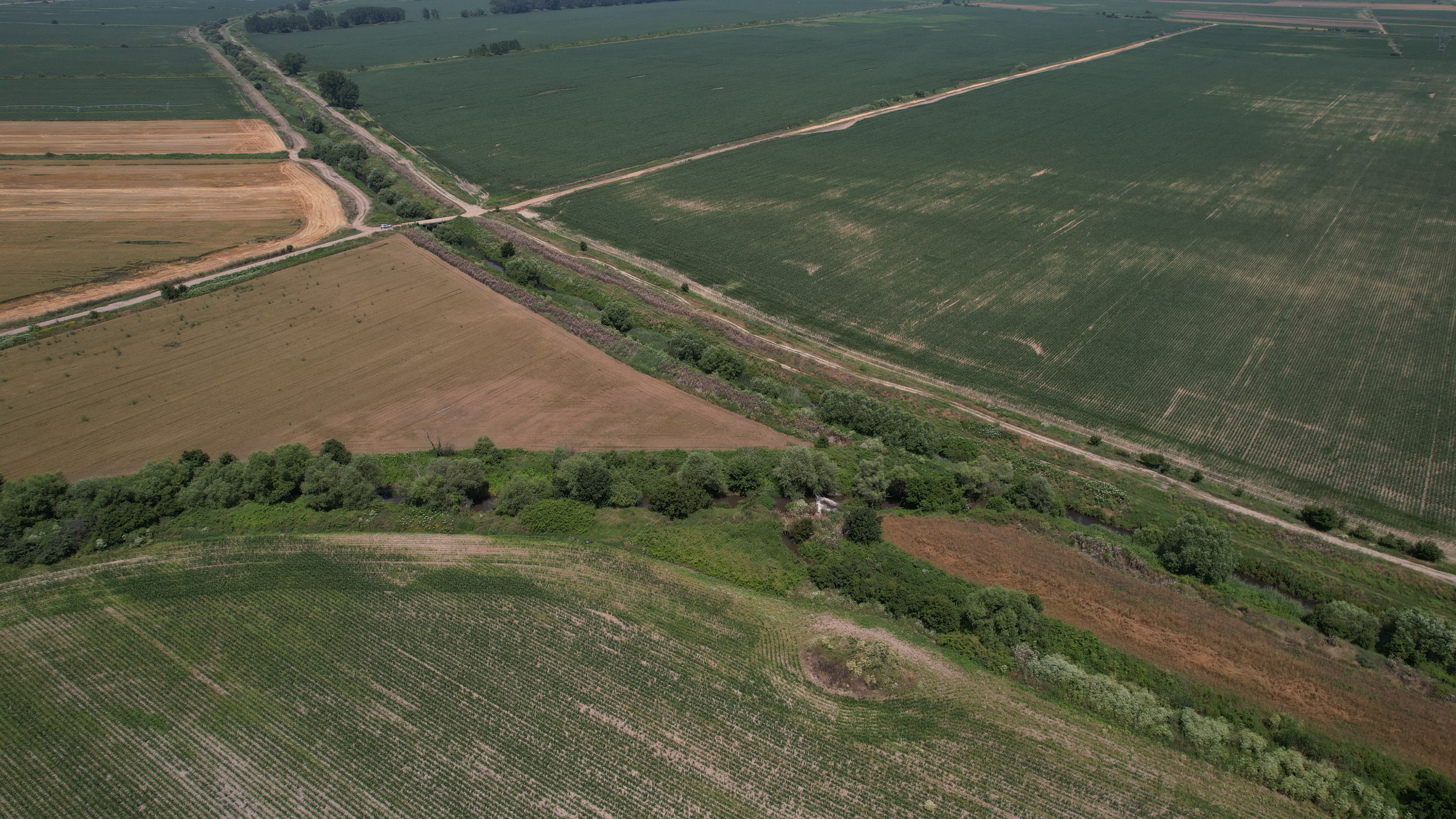
- Air view of the village

- Location within North Macedonia
- Country: North Macedonia
- Region: Pelagonia
- Municipality: Bitola

Population (2002)
  - Total: 0
- Time zone: UTC+1 (CET)
  - Summer (DST): UTC+2 (CEST)

Gorno Egri (Macedonian: Горно Егри) is an abandoned village in the Bitola Municipality of North Macedonia. It used to be part of the former municipality of Bistrica.

== Demographics ==
Gorno Egri is attested in the Ottoman defter of 1467/68 as a village in the vilayet of Manastir. A majority of names attested were Slavic, while a significant minority of inhabitants bore Albanian and mixed Slavic-Albanian anthroponyms, such as Rake, son of Gerg, Gon, son of Domnik, Zgur Protugjer among others.

In statistics gathered by Vasil Kanchov in 1900, the village of Gorno Egri was inhabited by 70 Christian Bulgarians and 50 Muslim Albanians. According to the 2002 census, the village had a total of 0 inhabitants.
