= Oleveni =

Oleveni Олевени
- Village
- Location within North Macedonia
- Country: North Macedonia
- Region: Pelagonia
- Municipality: Bitola

Population (2002)
  - Total: 157
- Time zone: UTC+1 (CET)
  - Summer (DST): UTC+2 (CEST)

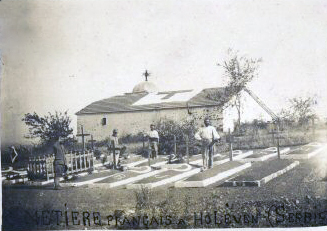
Saint George Church, located in Oleveni

Oleveni (Macedonian Cyrillic: Олевени) is a village in the Bitola Municipality of North Macedonia, located in the Pelagonia region in the southwestern part of the country. It is situated just south of the city of Bitola, in a historically rich and agricultural area.

== History and Community ==
The village has long-standing ties to Macedonian Orthodox tradition and rural village life. Many families originating from Oleveni have since migrated abroad, particularly to Australia, where they continue to maintain cultural and familial connections to the village.

Oleveni is home to several heritage sites and religious landmarks, reflecting its cultural importance within the Bitola region.

== Notable Landmarks ==
- Saint George Church – A historically significant Macedonian Orthodox church serving as a religious and cultural center for the local community. The site is known for its peaceful setting and local festivities.
- Cemetery of French Soldiers – Located in Oleveni, it is a World War I-era site where French soldiers who died during the Balkan campaigns were buried, highlighting the village’s historical importance.

== Demographics ==
According to the 2002 census, the village had a population of 157 residents. Due to urban migration and emigration trends, especially to Australia and Europe, Oleveni’s year-round population has declined, but its heritage and connections remain strong among the diaspora.

== Diaspora ==
A significant number of people from Oleveni have settled in cities such as Sydney and Melbourne & Adelaide in Australia. These communities continue to support and visit the village, especially during Orthodox religious holidays and the summer season.

== Demographics ==
According to the 2002 census, the village had a total of 157 inhabitants. Ethnic groups in the village include:

- Macedonians 156
- Serbs 1
