= Lopatica, Prilep =

Lopatica Лопатица
- Village
- Location within North Macedonia
- Coordinates: 41°10′46″N 21°35′44″E
- Country: North Macedonia
- Region: Pelagonia
- Municipality: Prilep
- Elevation: 842 m (2,762 ft)

Population (2002)
  - Total: 41
- Time zone: UTC+1 (CET)
- Area code: +389/48/4XXXXX

Lopatica is a village in Municipality of Prilep, North Macedonia. It used to be part of the former municipality of Topolčani.

== Demographics ==
According to the 2002 census, the village had a total of 41 inhabitants. Ethnic groups in the village include:

- Macedonians 41
