= Ramna, North Macedonia =

Ramna Рамна Ramnë
- Village
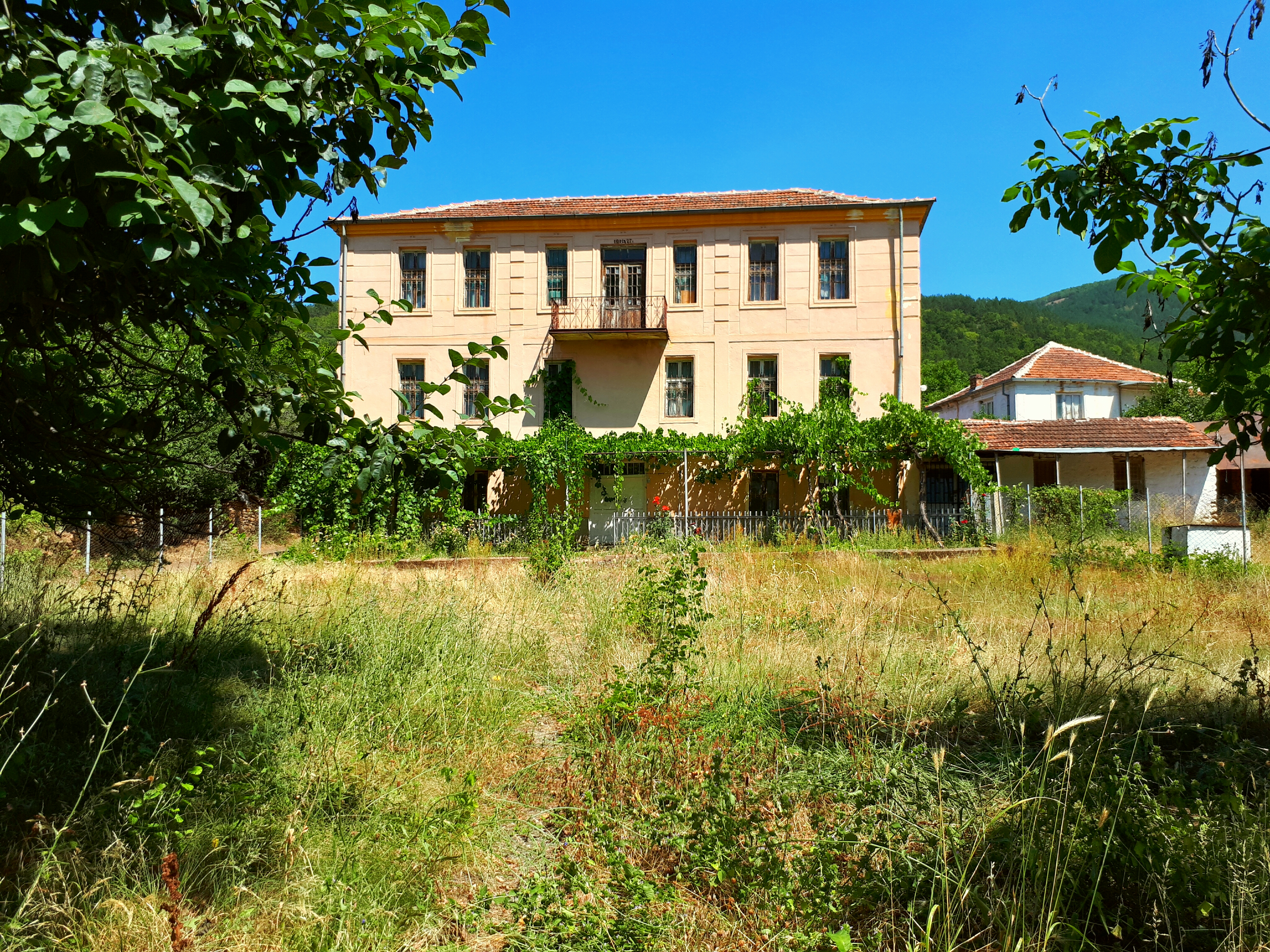
- Old architecture in the village

- Location within North Macedonia
- Coordinates: 41°05′23″N 21°11′08″E41°05′23″ СГШ 21°11′08″ ИГД
- Country: North Macedonia
- Region: Pelagonia
- Municipality: Bitola

Population (2002)
  - Total: 61
- Time zone: UTC+1 (CET)
  - Summer (DST): UTC+2 (CEST)
- Car plates: BT
- Website: .

Ramna (Macedonian: Рамна, Albanian: Ramnë) is a village in the municipality of Bitola, North Macedonia. It used to be part of the former municipality of Capari.

== Demographics ==
The Albanian population of Ramna are Tosks, a subgroup of southern Albanians. In statistics gathered by Vasil Kanchov in 1900, the village of Ramna was inhabited by 230 Muslim Albanians and 210 Bulgarians. In 1905 in statistics gathered by Dimitar Mishev Brancoff, Ramna was inhabited by 270 Muslim Albanians and 216 Bulgarian Exarchists and a Bulgarian school. According to the 2002 census, the village had a total of 61 inhabitants. Ethnic groups in the village include:

- Macedonians 53
- Albanians 7
- Others 1
