= Zlokuḱani, Karpoš =

Zlokuḱani Злокуќани
- Village
- Location within Republic of Macedonia
- Coordinates: 42°00′57″N 21°23′07″E
- Country: North Macedonia
- Region: Skopje
- Municipality: Karpoš

Population (2002)
  - Total: 1,635
- Time zone: UTC+1 (CET)
  - Summer (DST): UTC+2 (CEST)
- Car plates: SK
- Website: .

Zlokuḱani (Macedonian: Злокуќани) is a village in the municipality of Karpoš, North Macedonia.

== Demographics ==
According to the 2002 census, the village had a total of 1635 inhabitants. Ethnic groups in the village include:

- Macedonians 913
- Romani 534
- Albanians 46
- Serbs 31
- Turks 28
- Bosniaks 9
- Others 74
