= Ǵavato, Bitola =

Ǵavato Ѓавато
- Village
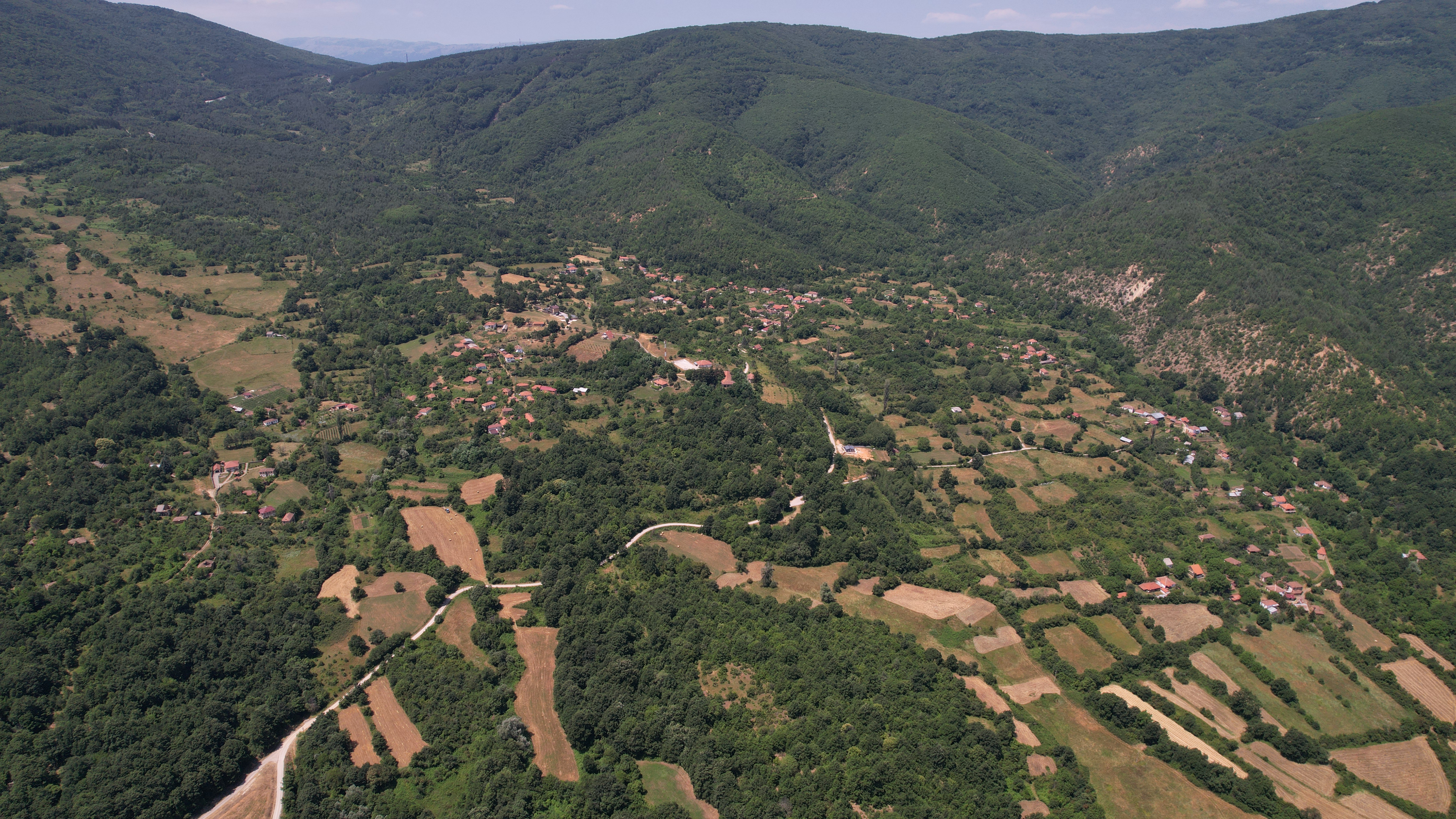
- Air view of the village

- Location within North Macedonia
- Country: North Macedonia
- Region: Pelagonia
- Municipality: Bitola

Population (2002)
  - Total: 122
- Time zone: UTC+1 (CET)
  - Summer (DST): UTC+2 (CEST)

Ǵavato (Macedonian: Ѓавато) is a village in the Bitola Municipality of North Macedonia. It used to be part of the former municipality of Capari.

== Demographics ==
According to the 2002 census, the village had a total of 122 inhabitants. Ethnic groups in the village include:

- Macedonians 122

== Notable people ==
Metodi Simonovski Profesor at the faculty of Dentistry, Pande Chumkovski Electrical Engineering Technologist 1949 Cveta Chumkovska teacher 1949
