= Zlokuḱani, Bitola =

Zlokuḱani Злокуќани Zllokuqan
- Village
- Location within North Macedonia
- Coordinates: 40°58′00″N 21°19′00″E
- Country: North Macedonia
- Region: Pelagonia
- Municipality: Bitola

Population (2002)
  - Total: 0
- Time zone: UTC+1 (CET)
  - Summer (DST): UTC+2 (CEST)
- Car plates: BT
- Website: .

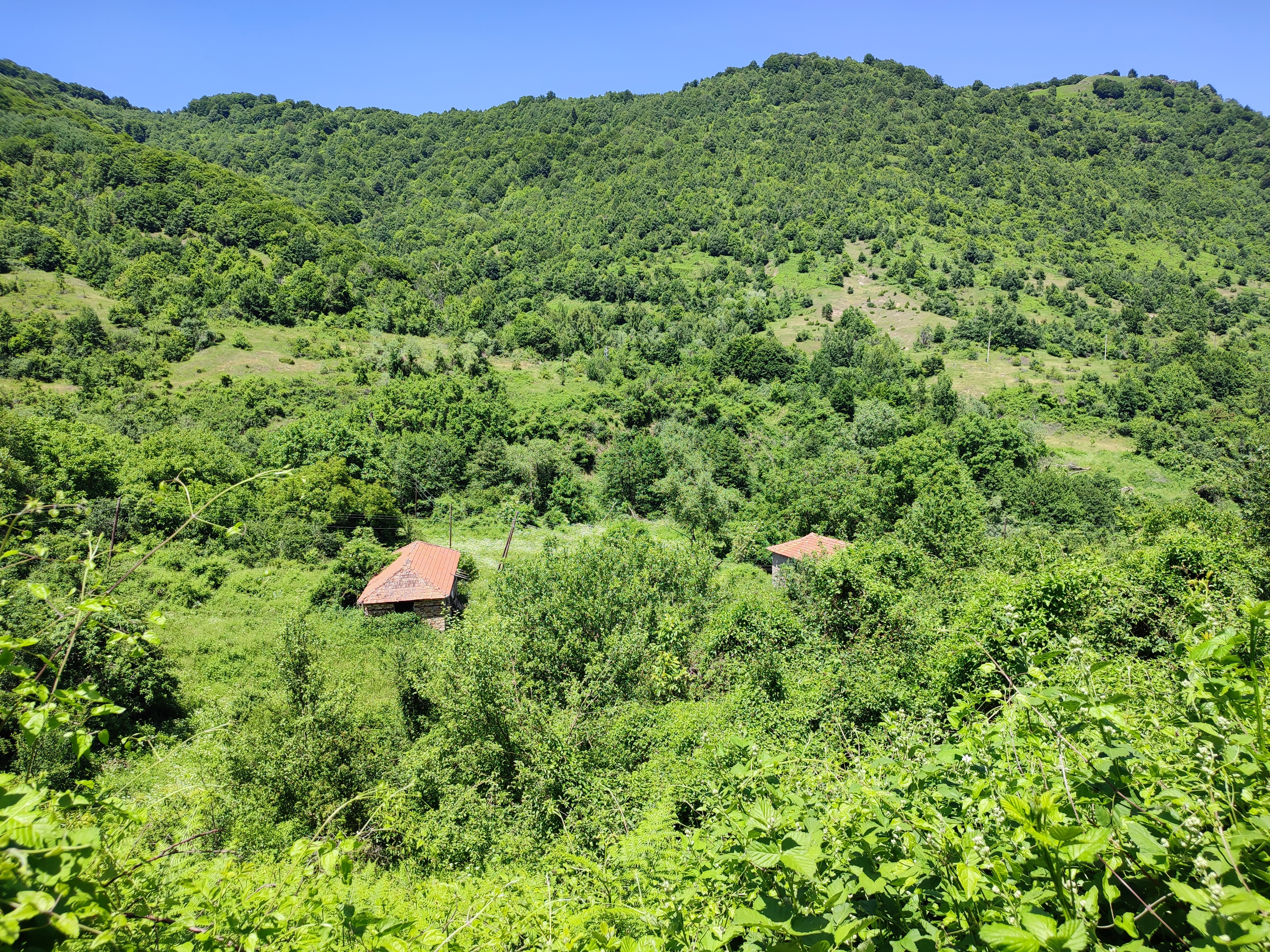
Zlokukani, abandoned village near Bitola

Zlokuḱani (Macedonian: Злокуќани, Albanian: Zllokuqan) is an abandoned village in the Bitola Municipality of North Macedonia. It used to be part of the former municipality of Bistrica.

== Demographics ==
The village of Zlokuḱani, when inhabited in the past was traditionally and exclusively populated by Ghegs, a northern subgroup of Albanians that spoke the Gheg Albanian dialect.

In statistics gathered by Vasil Kanchov in 1900, the village of Zlokuḱani was inhabited by 500 Muslim Albanians.

According to the 2002 census, the village had a total of 0 inhabitants.
