= Kukurečani =

Kukurečani Кукуречани
- Village
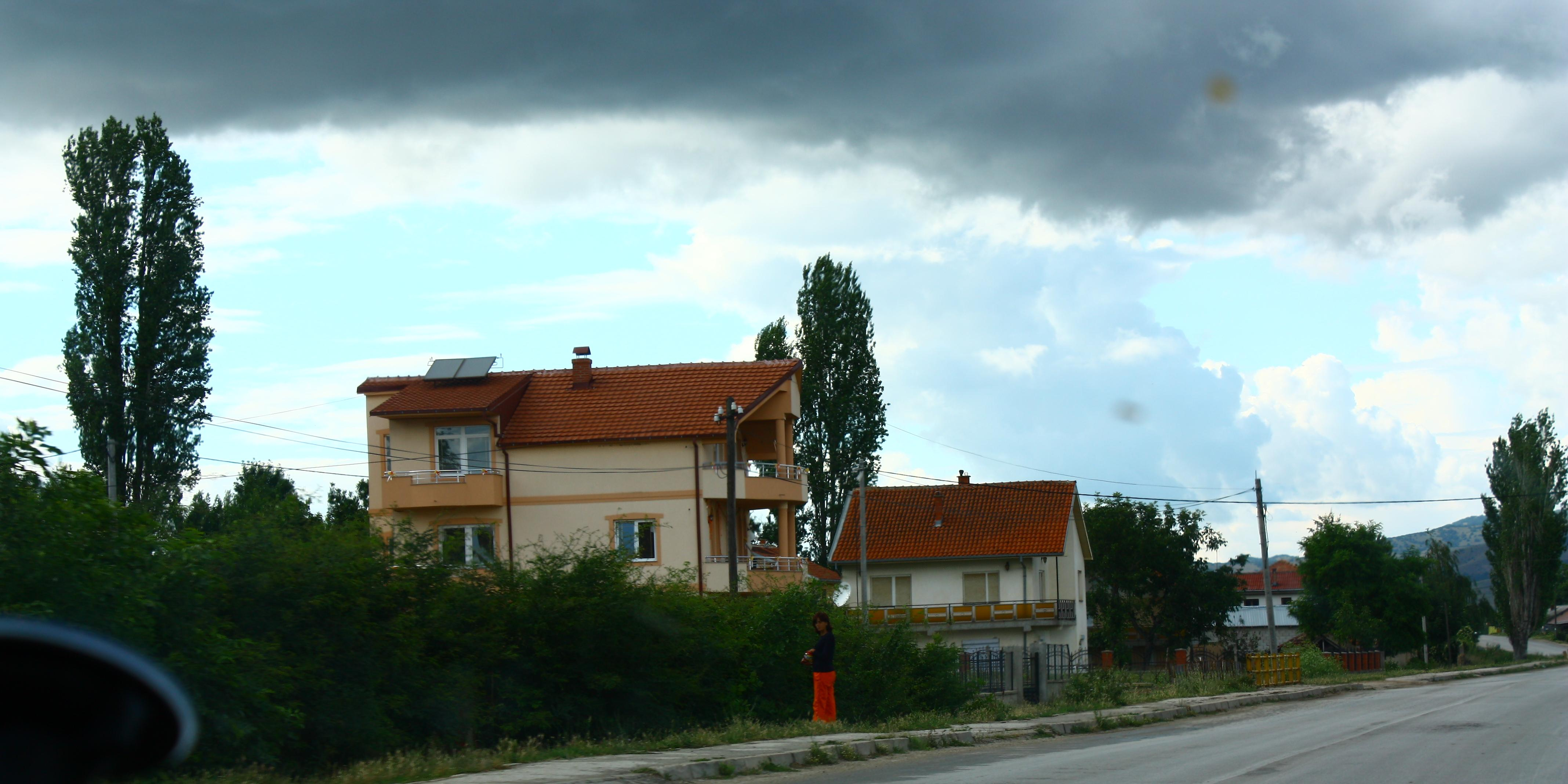
- Kukurečani in 2010

- Location within North Macedonia
- Country: North Macedonia
- Region: Pelagonia
- Municipality: Bitola

Population (2002)
  - Total: 966
- Time zone: UTC+1 (CET)
  - Summer (DST): UTC+2 (CEST)

Kukurečani (Macedonian: Кукуречани) is a village in the Bitola Municipality of North Macedonia. It is situated along the main road between Bitola and Demir Hisar (continuing for Kičevo). It used to be a municipality of its own and its FIPS code was MK56.

== Demographics ==
According to the 1467-68 Ottoman defter, the village had 150 houses, 8 bachelors and 3 widows. The village predominantly displayed Slavic anthroponymy, with a small minority of instances of heads of families having traditional Albanian names, usually alongside a Slavic one.

According to the 2002 census, the village had a total of 966 inhabitants. Ethnic groups in the village include:

- Macedonians 950
- Serbs 2
- Romani 14
