= List of power stations in North Macedonia =

This page article all power stations in North Macedonia.

== Hydroelectric ==
Station	Town	Coordinates	Capacity (MW)	Operational	Operator	Notes
Tikveš Hydroelectric Power Station	Kavadarci	41°24′18″N 21°56′11″E	116	1968	ESM	
Vrutok Hydroelectric Power Station	Gostivar		245	1960	ESM	
Vrben Hydroelectric Power Station			12	1957	ESM	
Raven Hydroelectric Power Station			19	?	ESM	
Kozjak Hydro Power Plant	Makedonski Brod	41°52′49″N 21°11′30″E	80	2000	ESM	
Spilje Hydro Power Plant	Debar	41°29′36″N 20°30′11″E	84	1969	ESM	
Globočica Hydro Power Plant	Struga		42	1965	ESM	
Sveta Petka Hydro Power Plant	Skopje	41°55′26″N 21°15′50″E	36.4	2012	ESM	

== Wind ==
Station	Town	Coordinates	Capacity (MW)	Operational	Operator	Notes
Bogdanci wind turbines	Bogdanci	41°13′43.8″N 22°33′46.8″E	36,8	2014	ESM	

== Thermal ==
Station	Town	Coordinates	Capacity (MW)	Fuel	Operational	Operator	Notes
REK Bitola	Novaci	41°03′29″N 21°29′00″E	675	Coal	Unit 1: 1984; Unit 2: 1984; Unit 3: 1988	ESM	Will be decommissioned by 2030
REK Oslomej	Oslomej	41°34′55″N 21°00′06″E	125	Coal	1980	ESM	Will be replaced by solar power plants by 2030
TEC Negotino	Negotino	41°29′2″N 22°05′21″E	195	Fuel oil	1978	ESM	İnactive from 2009

== See also ==
- List of power stations in Europe
- List of largest power stations in the world
