= Streževo =

Streževo Стрежево
- Village
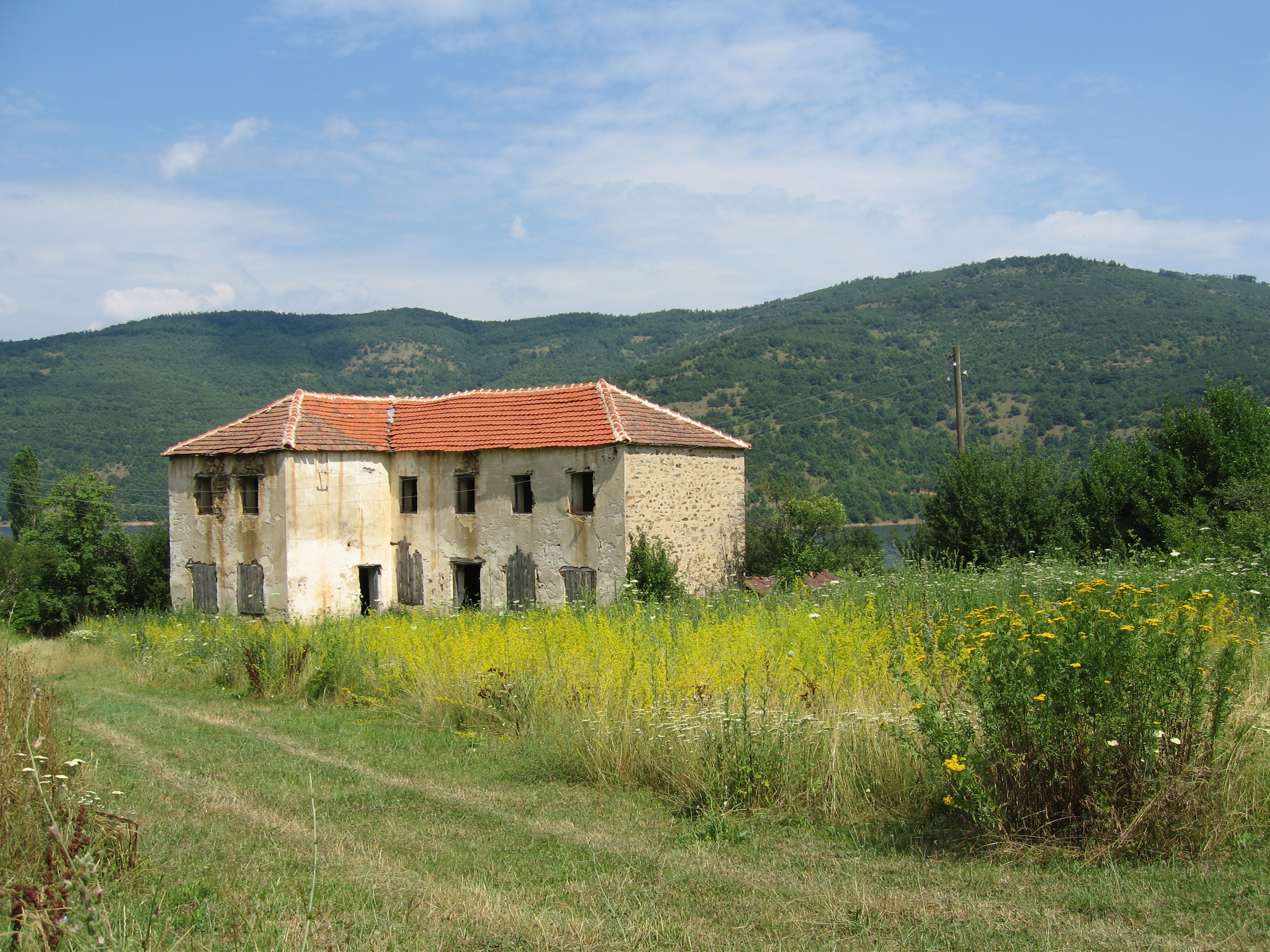
- Town Hall in the former Centre of Streževo

- Location of Streževo within North Macedonia
- Coordinates: 41°08′N 21°11′E
- Country: North Macedonia
- Region: Pelagonia
- Municipality: Bitola

Area
  - Total: 2.267 km^{2} (0.875 sq mi)
- Elevation: 763 m (2,503 ft)

Population (2021)
  - Total: 0
- Time zone: UTC+1 (CET)
  - Summer (DST): UTC+2 (CEST)

Streževo (Macedonian: Стрежево) is an abandoned village in the Bitola Municipality of North Macedonia. It used to be part of the former municipality of Capari.

The Villages history dates back further than kept records, however, some of the oldest citizens claim the village has been around for well over 500 years. The village is situated at the foot of Baba Mountain and on the border of the Bitola and Demir Hisar Municipalities. Due to the construction of the Streževo dam, the village has become abandoned. Besides the rare visit back to the abandoned homes for wood collection for winter and other activities, it's mostly empty. The houses have mostly become overgrown with shrubs and bushes and the main town hall is falling apart due to neglect. Streževo's former residents and their descendants still gather in the village for "Ivan Den" which is celebrated at Streževo's monastery. This celebration takes place on 7 July.

== Society ==
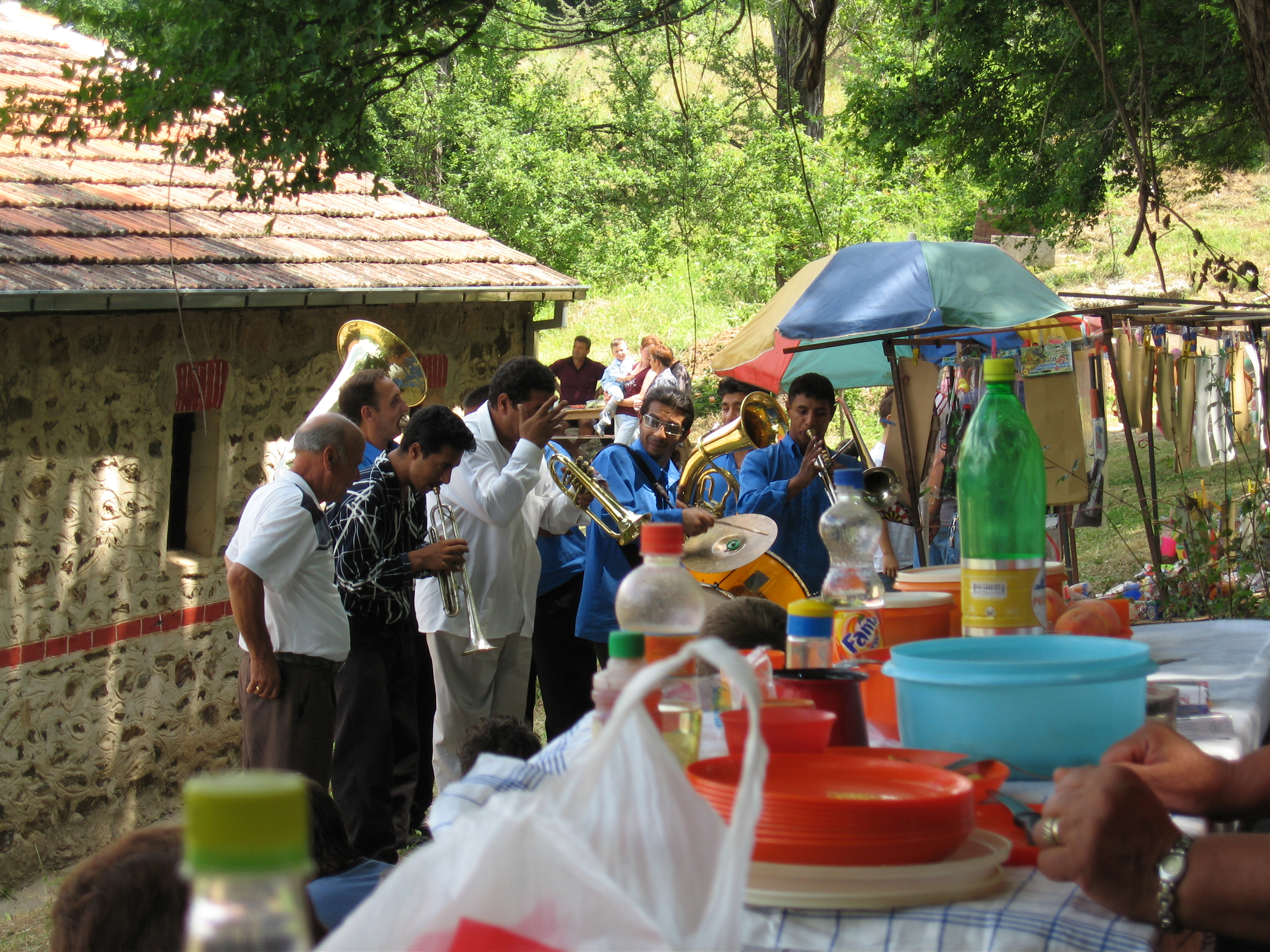
Ivan Day Celebrations in Streževo

=== Current descendants ===
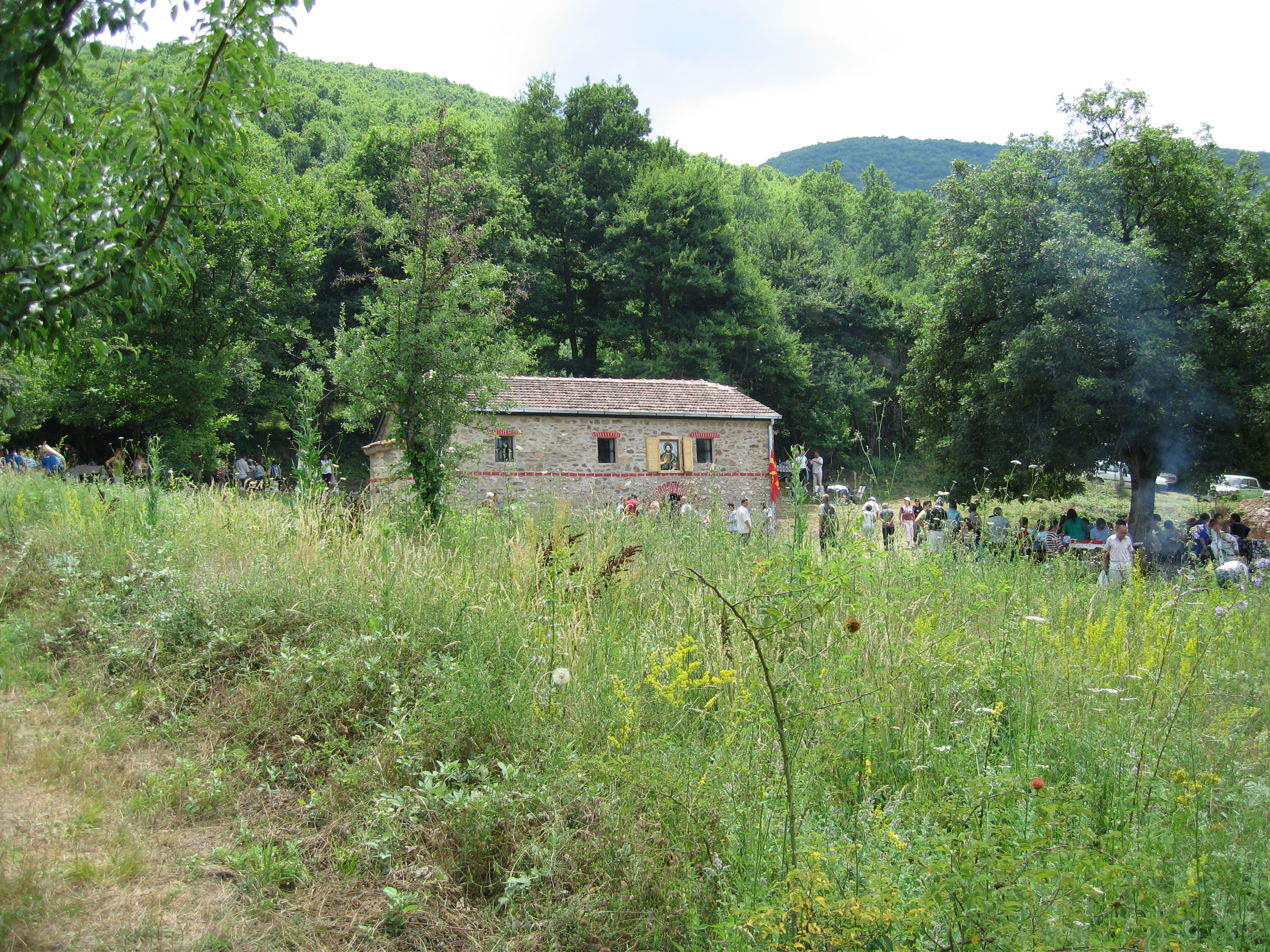
The Monastery in Streževo - Ivan Den 2005

Most of the Streževo people currently reside in Bitola in a new suburb dubbed "Streževska Naselba" or "Gorno Orizari" which roughly translates to "Suburb of Streževo". A significant number of Streževo's residents and descendants, however, have relocated abroad, mainly to Australia with some also relocating to Canada. There they have been heavily involved in local Macedonian Community administration and membership.

=== Economics and politics ===
Streževo had close ties to neighbouring villages such as Crnovec, Metimir, Oblakovo, Strugovo and Crnobuki to name a few. The close relations were good for trade as these villages were much closer with more accessibility than Bitola has during a time where the automobile was not as accessible as today in the region. An important part of the growth of these villages was the marriages that took place between them. Due to the small population of the villages, most inhabitants were related to each other. Because of this, some people, usually the males, would seek a wife in a nearby village and bring her back to start a family with her. This practice was crucial for inter-village relations and the growth of the villages. Some common family names from the villages are Naumovski, Bozinovski, Stepanovski, Lazarevski, Micevski and Markovski.

Due to its location at the foot of the mountains, most of its trade came from tree lopping and the sale of locally farmed produce to the town of Bitola. Citizens used to make the commute by bicycle or horse if no automobile was available and sell their produce in the Bitola marketplace. This was one of the only ways a family would get an income and was of extreme importance. Though the village was mostly self-sustainable, it still was necessary for families to trade goods and services for money and trading in Bitola was of significant importance at the time.

=== Sports ===
Just as in the country as a whole, Streževo was heavily involved in football. The village formerly had a football team which played in the regional league playing against villages in close proximately however due to the building of the dam and relocation of its people the Strezevo team has since disbanded. Many of the Streževans (Streževtsi) who had relocated to Perth, Australia became heavily involved in the local Macedonian football club originally called East Perth Vardar, which later was known as Stirling Suns.

== Geography ==
=== Streževo Lake ===
In 1982, the damming of Šemnica river was completed, to form the Streževo Lake. The nearby thermal power plant REK Bitola uses it as a source for water cooling.

=== Flora and fauna ===
The flora and fauna in and around Streževo are the usual forms around the Baba Mountain region with a wide variety of blooming wildflowers and berries sprouting in the springtime after the snow and cold weather has passed. Some of the local wildlife include the brown bear which scathes the dense forest of the mountains' lower slopes, a range of wild dogs from wolves to foxes and many bird species. Streževo also is home to a multitude of bee farms in which locals will come to harvest the honey from during summertime. The village also had a technique for catching the local trout in the river. The Strezevski Pastramka would hide under large rocks, villagers would drop similar sized rocks on the rock in the water. This would either stun or kill the fish allowing for easy capture.
