= EVN =

EVN may refer to:

- Electric vehicle network
- Escape Velocity Nova, a video game
- English visual novel, a term used to refer to visual novels originally written in English
- European Vehicle Number, an identifying marking for railway vehicles in Europe and some adjacent regions
- European VLBI Network
- Eurovision News Exchange; see Eurovision Network
- Evenki language (ISO 639-3 code)
- EVN Group, an Austrian energy provider
  - EVN AD Skopje, a subsidiary in North Macedonia
  - EVN Bulgaria, a subsidiary, owner of Toplofikatsiya Plovdiv and the Bulgarian part of the Gorna Arda Hydro Power Plant project
- Vietnam Electricity, a Vietnamese electricity provider
- Zvartnots International Airport, in Armenia
