= Bogdanci wind turbines =

Wind park near Bogdanci, North Macedonia

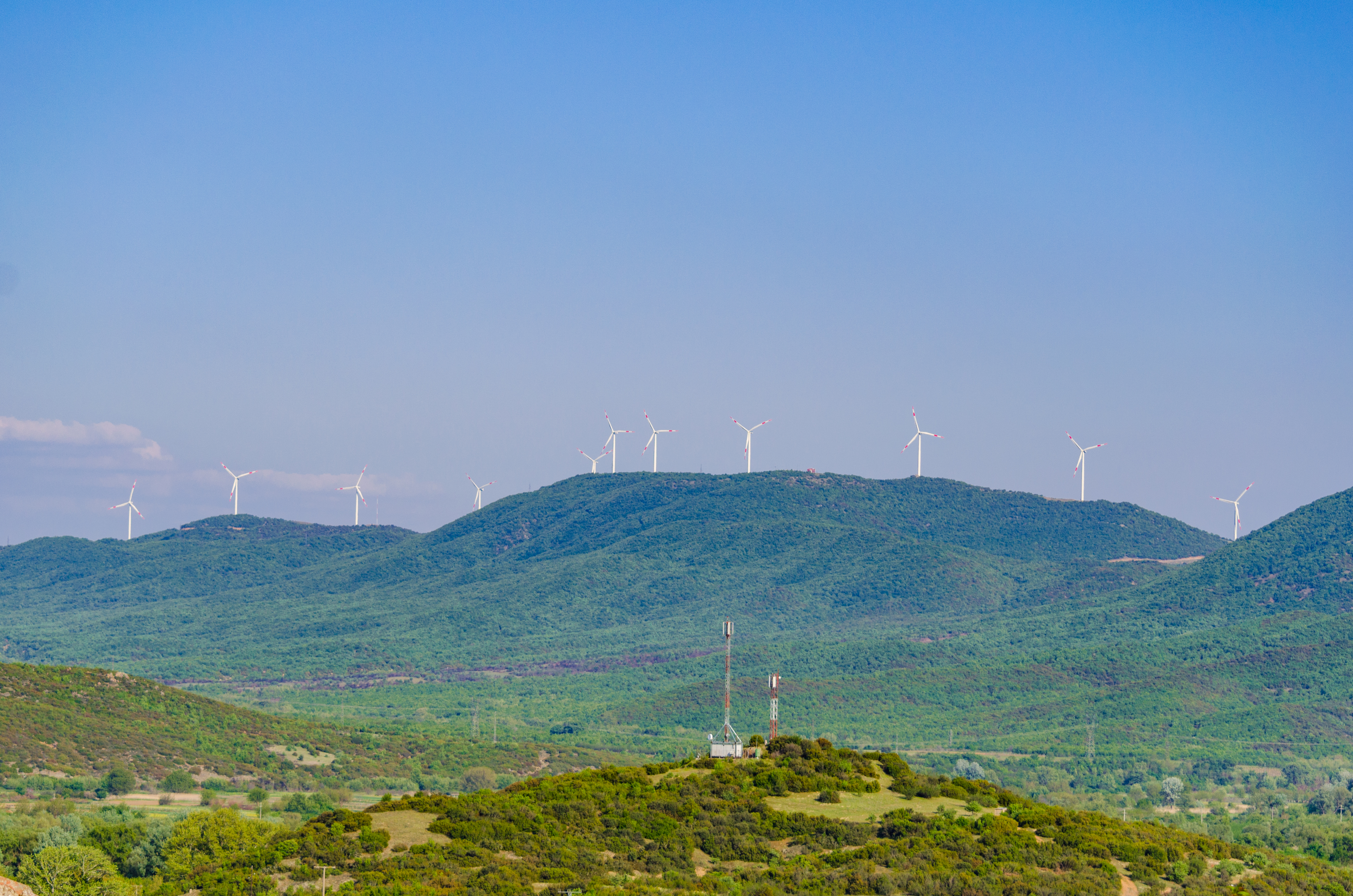
- View of the wind turbines in the park
- Country: North Macedonia
- Location: Bogdanci
- Coordinates: 41°13′43″N 22°33′47″E
- Construction began: 18 May 2013
- Construction cost: EUR 55.5 million
- Owner: Elektrani na Makedonija

Bogdanci wind turbines park ( PVE Bogdanci), also known as Wind park „Bogdanci“) is a wind park near the town Bogdanci, North Macedonia. Its construction began in May 2013 and was finished in February 2014. The wind turbines began commercial operations within North Macedonia's electricity distribution network on 21 March 2014.

== Location ==
The Bogdanci wind turbines park is located near the town Bogdanci, on the Ranavec hill which rises above Bogdanci. It covers an area of 29 hm^{2} (347,000 yd^{2}).

== Building ==
=== First stage ===
The first stage of the project ended in February 2014 after all of the 16 planned wind turbines were raised up and completed, while in March 2014 they were connected to the MEPSO distribution network. After connecting followed test trials, after which the commercial operations began.

During March 2014, the road infrastructure, power line connections, command building, and the 20/110 kW electrical substation were also finished. The total cost for building the wind park was EUR 55.5 million, of which EUR 47.9 million (86.3%) were borrowed from Germany through KfW Bank, while the remaining EUR 7.6 million (13.7%) were taken from Elektrani na Makedonija's own budget.

=== Stage 2 ===
In the second stage of the project, six additional wind turbines shall be added, which will increase the installed power to 50 MW, resulting in an annual green energy production of 125 GW·h.

== Commercial operations ==
The test period started with the wind park's connection to the Macedonian electricity distribution system, and after it had been completed, the wind turbines entered the commercial operations phase. The wind turbines were connected to the electricity distributional network on 21 March 2014. Until 10 August 2014, the wind park delivered 31 GW·h of electricity, which is one third of its planned 100 GW·h annual production, sufficient for providing a city with a population of 60,000 with electricity.

== Gallery ==
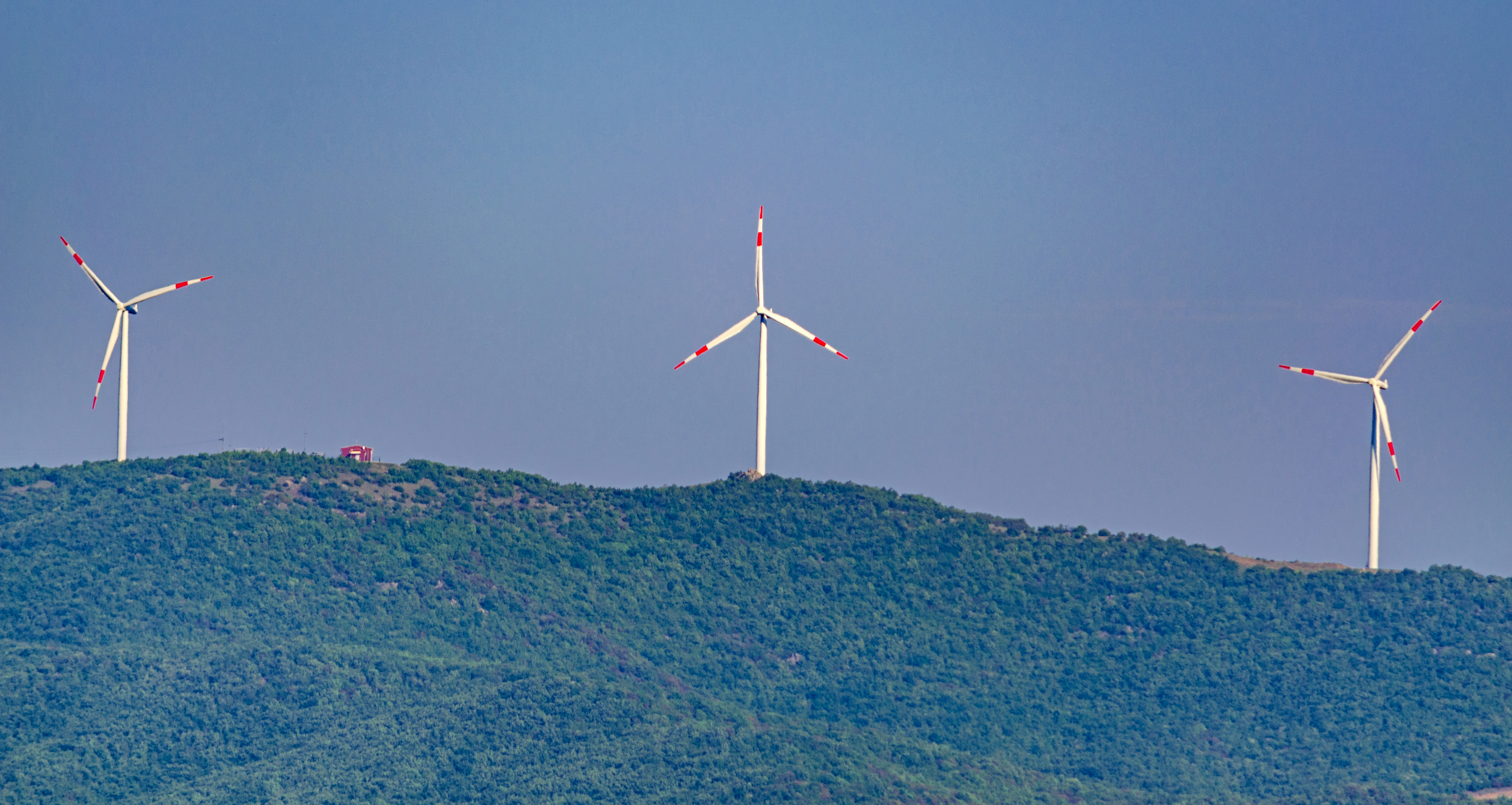

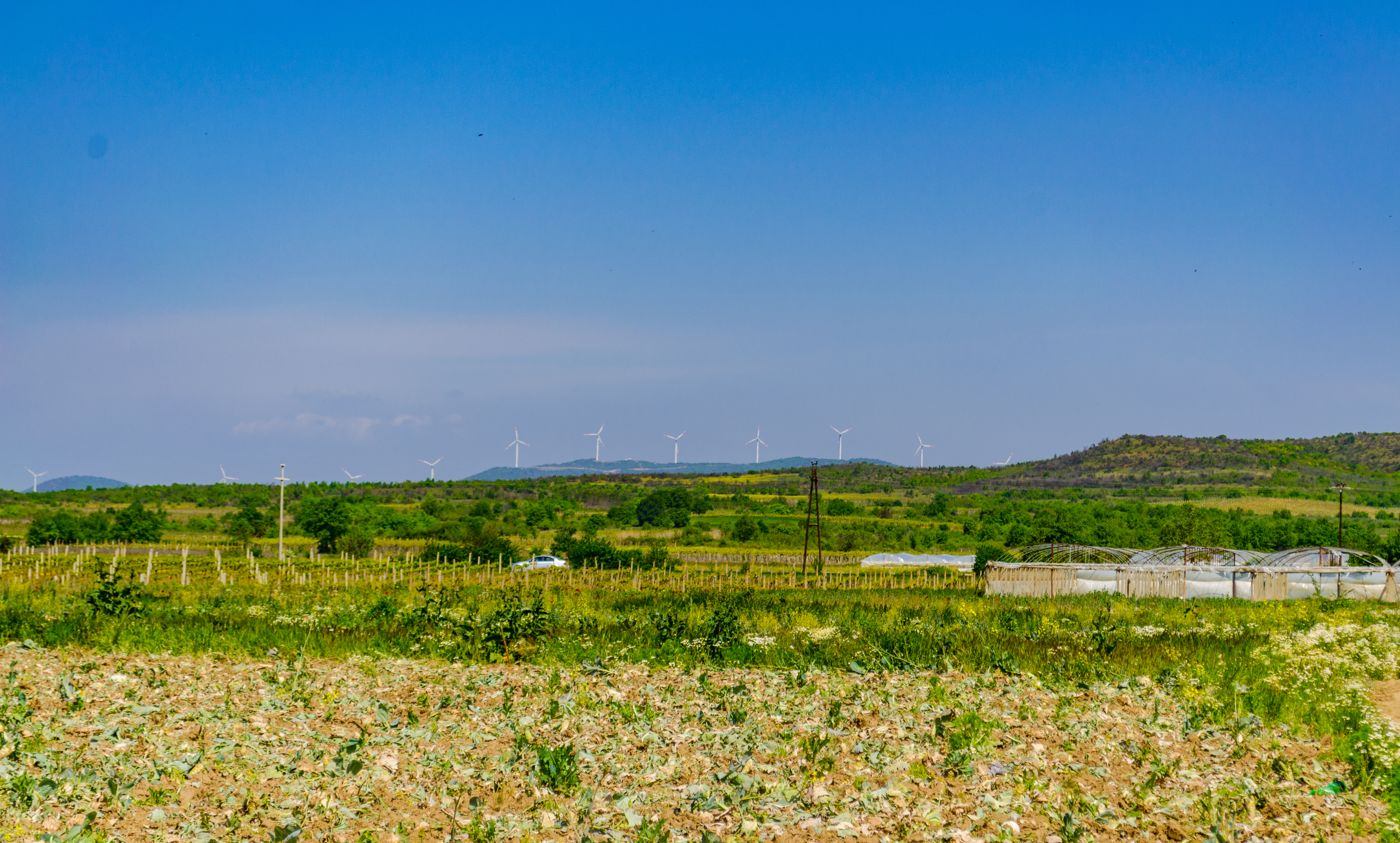

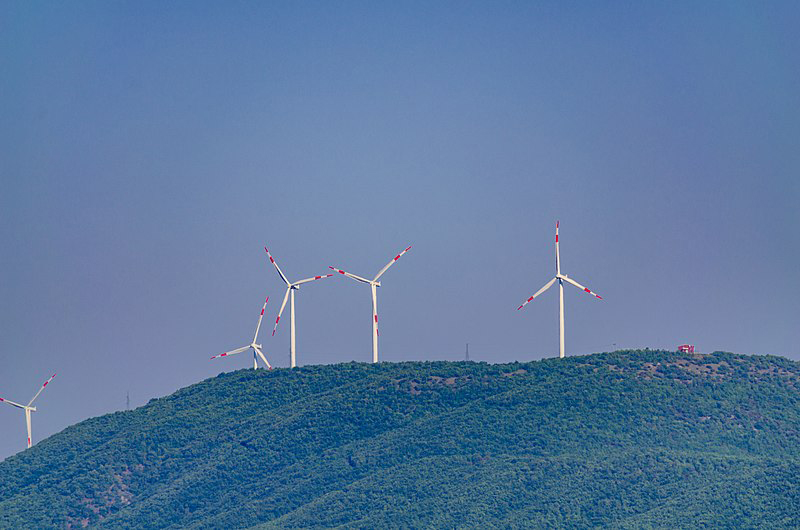
