= EBH =

EBH may refer to:

- Early Biblical Hebrew (EBH)
- El Bayadh Airport, in Algeria
- Ellis, Beggs & Howard, an English rock band
- Emergency Behavioral Health (Pennsylvania Department of Human Services)
- Erling Braut Haaland, Norwegian footballer
- Extra-base hit
- Cyrillic script for:
  - EVN AD Skopje (ЕВН АД Скопје), a power company in North Macedonia
  - EVN Bulgaria (ЕВН България), a power company
