= Suvodol coal mine =

Open-pit coal mine in North Macedonia

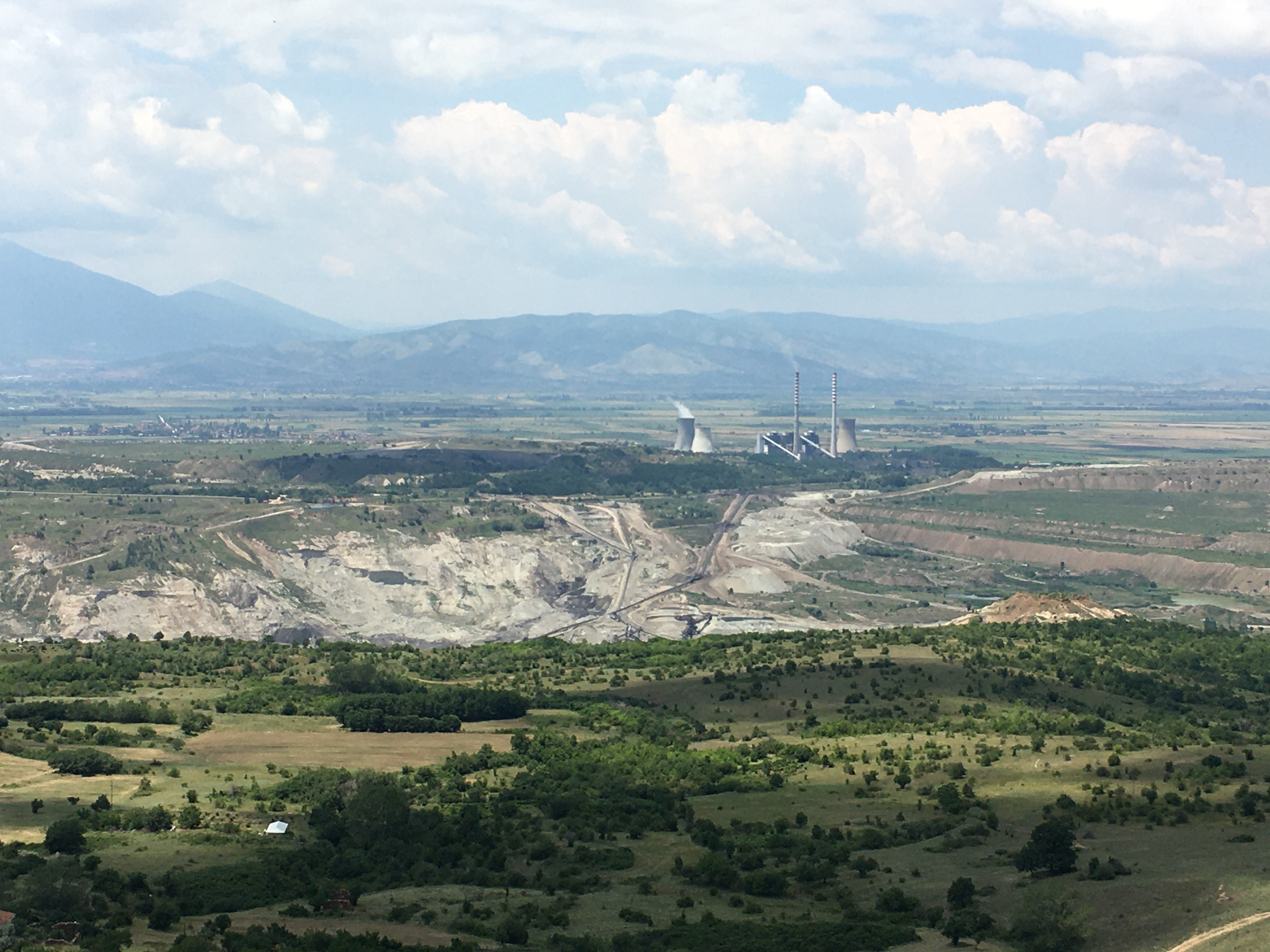
- View on Suvodol open-pit mine site, June 2021

- Location within North Macedonia
- Location: Novaci Municipality, North Macedonia; 41.046°N 21.515°E
- Products: Coal mining
- Production: 2.00 million tonnes of coal (2024)
- Company: Elektrani na Severna Makedonija (ESM)

The Suvodol Coal Mine is an open-pit coal mine located in Novaci Municipality, North Macedonia. It is operated by Elektrani na Severna Makedonija (ESM) and has produced 2.00 million tonnes of coal as of 2024. The mine has coal reserves amounting to 175 million tonnes of lignite, one of the largest coal reserves in Europe and the world.

Together with the coal mined at Brod-Gneotino coal mine, the most of it is used for the electricity production at REK Bitola.
