= Toplofikatsiya Plovdiv =

Plovdiv, Bulgaria heating company

Toplofikatsiya Plovdiv (Bulgarian: Топлофикация Пловдив) is the district heating company in the city of Plovdiv in Southern Bulgaria. It is one of the largest district heating networks in the country, also supplying heat energy to the town of Asenovgrad, around 10 km to the southeast, and serves a total of 35 000 customers.

As of 2007, Toplofikatsiya Plovdiv is wholly owned by Austrian company EVN, which also holds the electricity distribution monopoly for the whole of southeastern Bulgaria. Since it was taken over by EVN, Toplofikatsiya Plovdiv's official name is "EVN Toplofikatsiya Bulgaria".

Toplofikatsiya Plovdiv has two power stations – one of which is a cogeneration plant and the other a heat-only boiler station.

Name	Heat energy capacity (MW_{t})	Heat energy output (2011) (MWh_{t})	Electric capacity (MW_{e})	Electric output (2011) (MWh_{e})	Built	Notes
Plovdiv North	431 ^{(p. 5)}	428 400 ^{(p. 5)}	55 ^{(p. 3)}	79 700 ^{(p. 21)}	1970s	-
Plovdiv South	99 ^{(p. 3)}	65 600 ^{(p. 4)}	–	–		-
Total	530	494 000	55	65 600	–	-

According to the company's website, the Plovdiv North cogeneration plant was renovated in 2011 with extra capacity of an extra 50 MW_{e} and an extra 54 MW_{t}, brought into exploitation in Sept 2011, although the original plans were for an extra 123 MW_{t} of heating capacity to be constructed.
