= Brod-Gneotino coal mine =

Open-pit coal mine in North Macedonia

- Location within North Macedonia
- Location: Novaci Municipality, North Macedonia; 40°57′51″N 21°32′44″E
- Products: Coal mining
- Production: 950,000 tonnes of coal (2024)
- Company: Elektrani na Severna Makedonija (ESM)

The Brod-Gneotino coal mine is an open-pit coal mine located in Novaci Municipality, North Macedonia. It is operated by Elektrani na Severna Makedonija (ESM) and has produced 950,000 tonnes of coal as of 2024.

Together with the coal mined at Suvodol coal mine, most of it is used for the electricity production at REK Bitola; the coal from Brod-Gneotino coal mine is transported via 10 km long conveyor system.
