= Vardar =

River in North Macedonia and Greece

Vardar Вардар Βαρδάρης
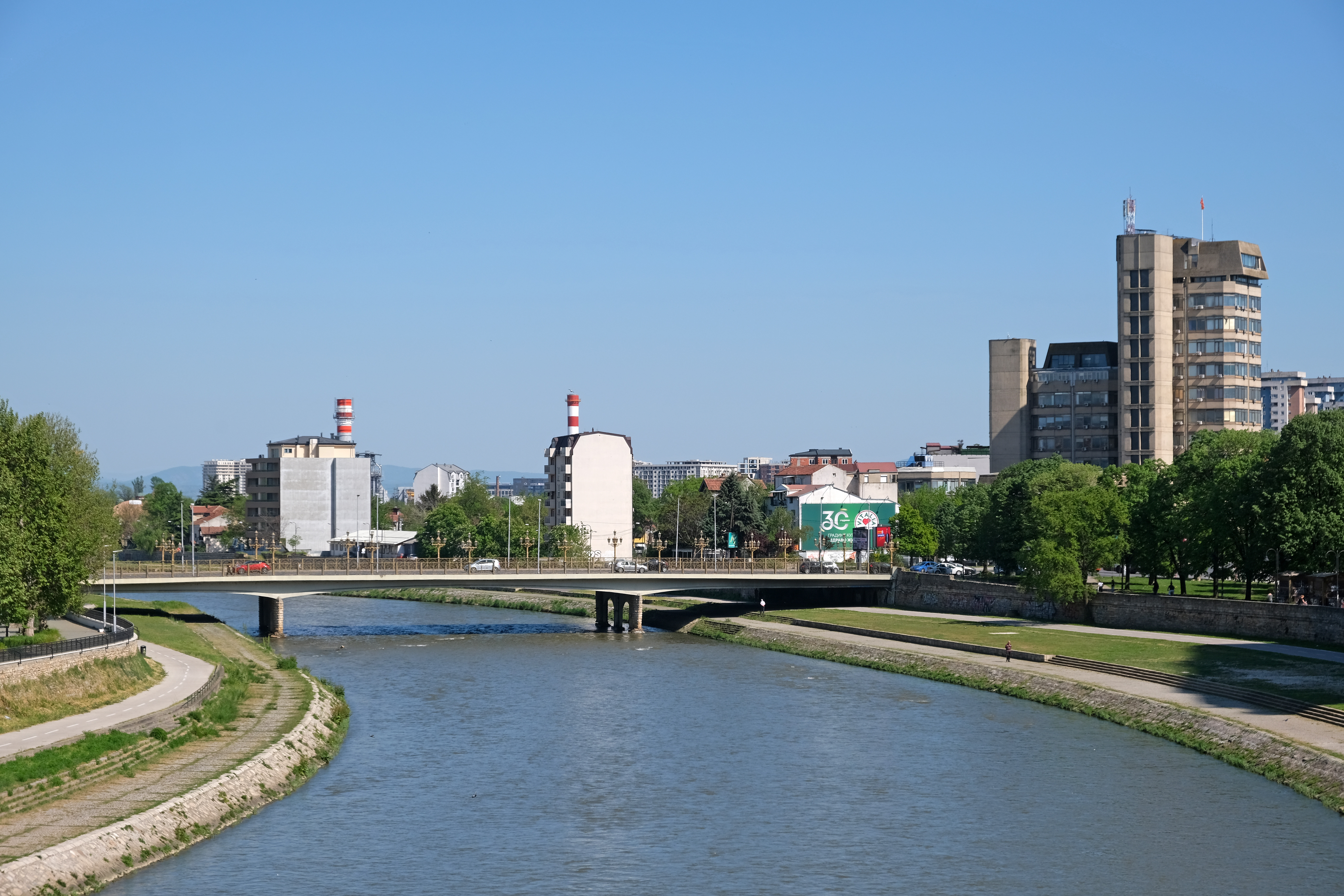
- Vardar in Skopje
- Native name: Вардар (Macedonian); Vardari (Albanian); Αξιός (Greek)

Location
- Countries: North Macedonia and Greece

Physical characteristics
- Source
  - location: Vrutok, near Gostivar
- Mouth
  - location: Aegean Sea, near Thessaloniki
  - coordinates: 41°56′27″N 22°43′3″E
- Length: 388 km (241 mi)

The Vardar (/ˈvɑːrdɑːr/; Macedonian: Вардар, Greek: Βαρδάρης, Albanian: Vardar/-i, Turkish: Vardar) or Axios (Greek: Αξιός, romanized: Aksiós, Albanian: Asi (historically)) is the longest river in North Macedonia and a major river in Greece, where it reaches the Aegean Sea at Thessaloniki. It is 388 km (241 mi) long, out of which 76 km (47 mi) are in Greece, and drains an area of around 25,000 km^{2} (9,653 sq mi). The maximum depth of the river is 4 m (13 ft).

== Etymology ==
The name Vardar for the river may have been derived from Thracian, although Dardanian, Paeonian, Ancient Macedonian, Attic and Koine Greek were also spoken in the lands drained by the river.

The modern Vardar is thought to derive from an earlier *Vardários, which may ultimately derive from Proto-Indo-European (PIE) *(s)wordo-wori- "black water". The name Vardários (Βαρδάριος) was sometimes used by the Ancient Greeks in the 3rd century BC. The same name was widely used in the Byzantine era.

Vardar/Vardarios may be a translation of (or otherwise have a similar meaning as) Axios, which may be Thracian and may have meant "not-shining" from PIE *n.-sk(e)i (cf. Avestan axšaēna "dark-coloured"). The oldest known name of the river, Axios, is mentioned by Homer (Il. 21.141, Il. 2.849) as the home of the Paeonians allies of Troy. Pjetër Bogdani would use the form Asi, an earlier Albanian-language name for the river.

This same hypothetical Thracian Axio- meaning "dark, not-shining" is theorized to be found in the name of a city at the mouth of the Danube, called Axiopolis in Greek and Axíopa (perhaps again meaning just "dark water") in Thracian, which may later have been translated into Slavic as Cernavodă, also meaning "black water".

== Geography ==
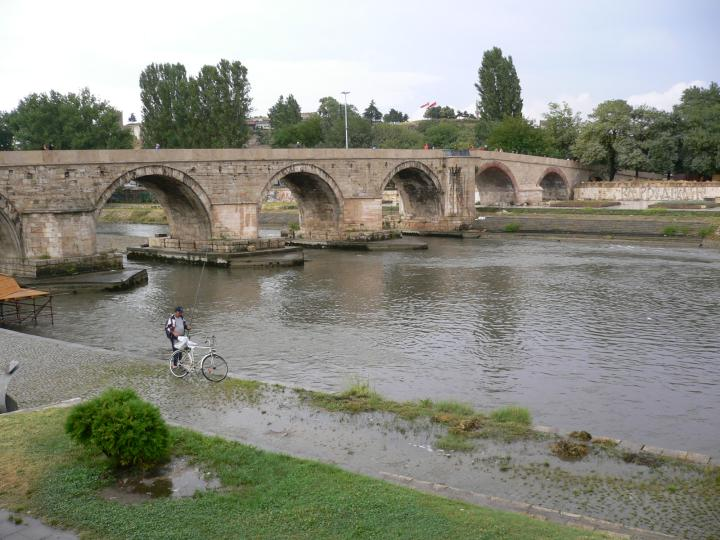
Vardar in Skopje: the Stone Bridge

The river rises at Vrutok, a few kilometers southwest of Gostivar in North Macedonia. It passes through Gostivar, Skopje and into Veles, crosses the Greek border near Gevgelija, Polykastro and Axioupoli ("town on the Axiós"), before emptying into the Thermaic Gulf, west of Thessaloniki, in Central Macedonia in northern Greece. The river forms a large delta along with Loudias and Haliacmon at the Axios-Loudias-Aliakmonas National Park.

The Vardar basin comprises two-thirds of the territory of North Macedonia. The valley features fertile lands in the Polog region, around Gevgelija and in the Thessaloniki regional unit. The river is surrounded by mountains elsewhere. The superhighways Greek National Road 1 in Greece and M1 and E75 run within the valley along the river's entire length to near Skopje.

The river was very famous during the Ottoman Empire and remains so in modern-day Turkey as the inspiration for many folk songs, of which the most famous is Vardar Ovasi. It has also been depicted on the coat of arms of Skopje, which in turn is incorporated in the city's flag.

== Project to construct the Danube-Vardar-Aegean Canal ==
A proposal to construct a canal connecting the Morava river valley with the Vardar, and hence linking the Danube to the Aegean Canal, has been a dream for a long time. Le Figaro published a project of Athens and Belgrade on 28.08.2017. The Greek-Serbian proposal made in Beijing is Pharaonic: 651 km. A project worth 17 billion.

== Vardaris wind ==
The Vardaris or Vardarec is a powerful prevailing northerly ravine wind which blows across the river valley in Greece as well as in North Macedonia. At first it descends along the "canal" of the Vardar valley, usually as a breeze. When it encounters the high mountains that separate Greece from North Macedonia, it descends the other side, gathering a tremendous momentum and bringing cold conditions to the city of Thessaloniki and the Axios delta. Somewhat similar to the mistral wind of France, it occurs when atmospheric pressure over eastern Europe is higher than over the Aegean Sea, as is often the case in winter.

== Gallery ==
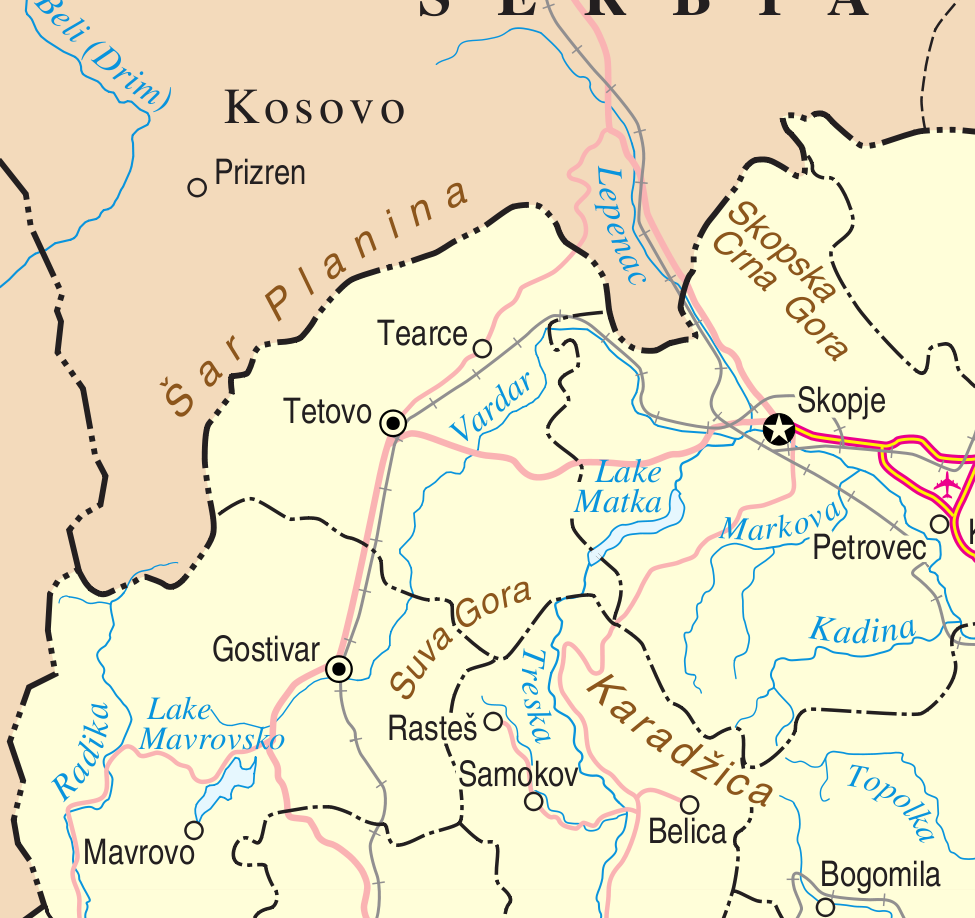
Map of the northwestern part of North Macedonia including the source of the Vardar

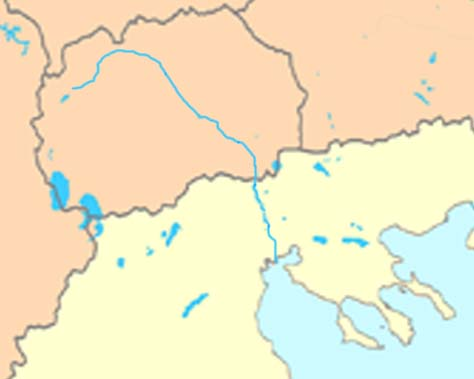
Axios/Vardar river map

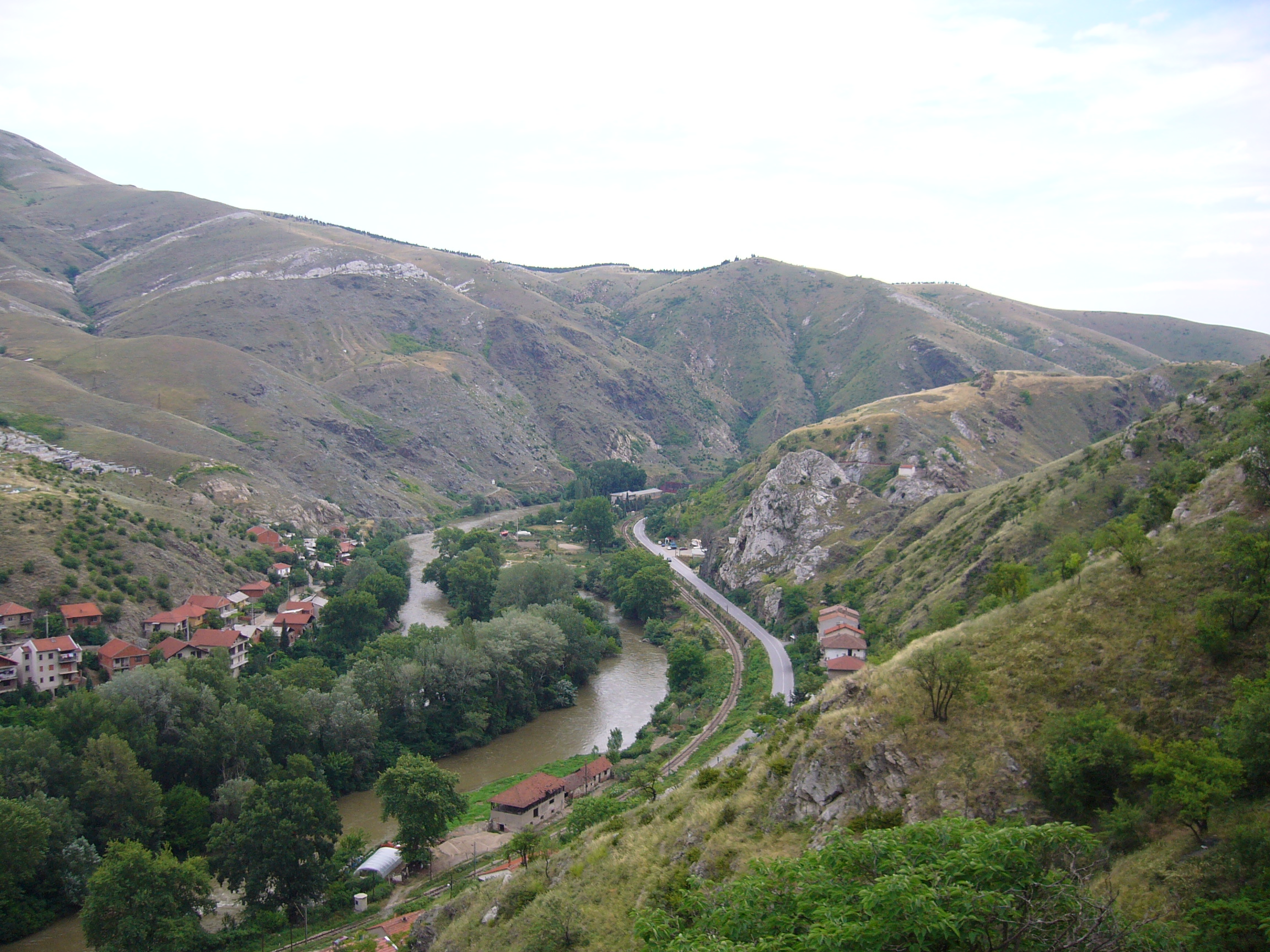
Veles Gorge

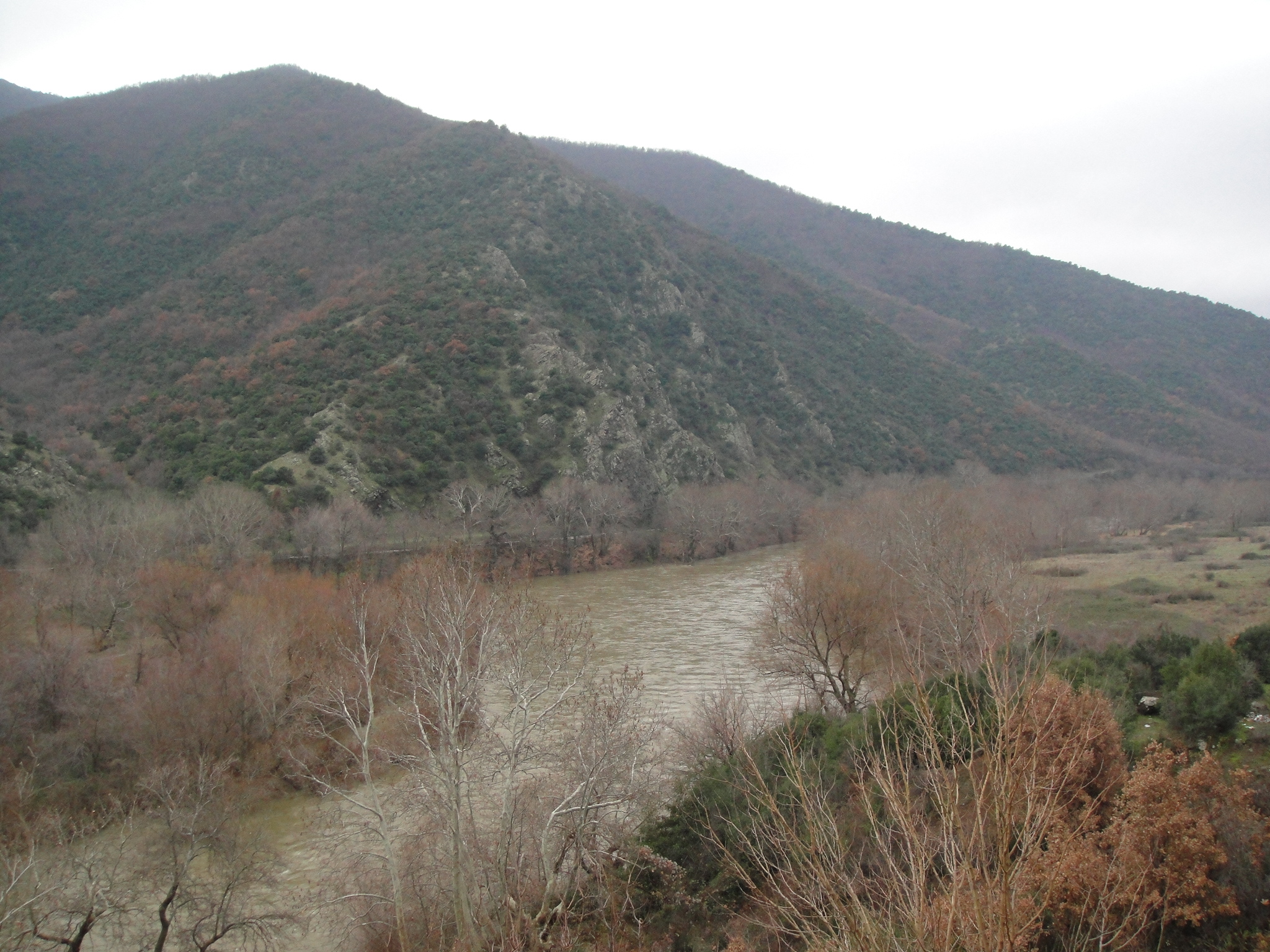
River Vardar near Gradsko

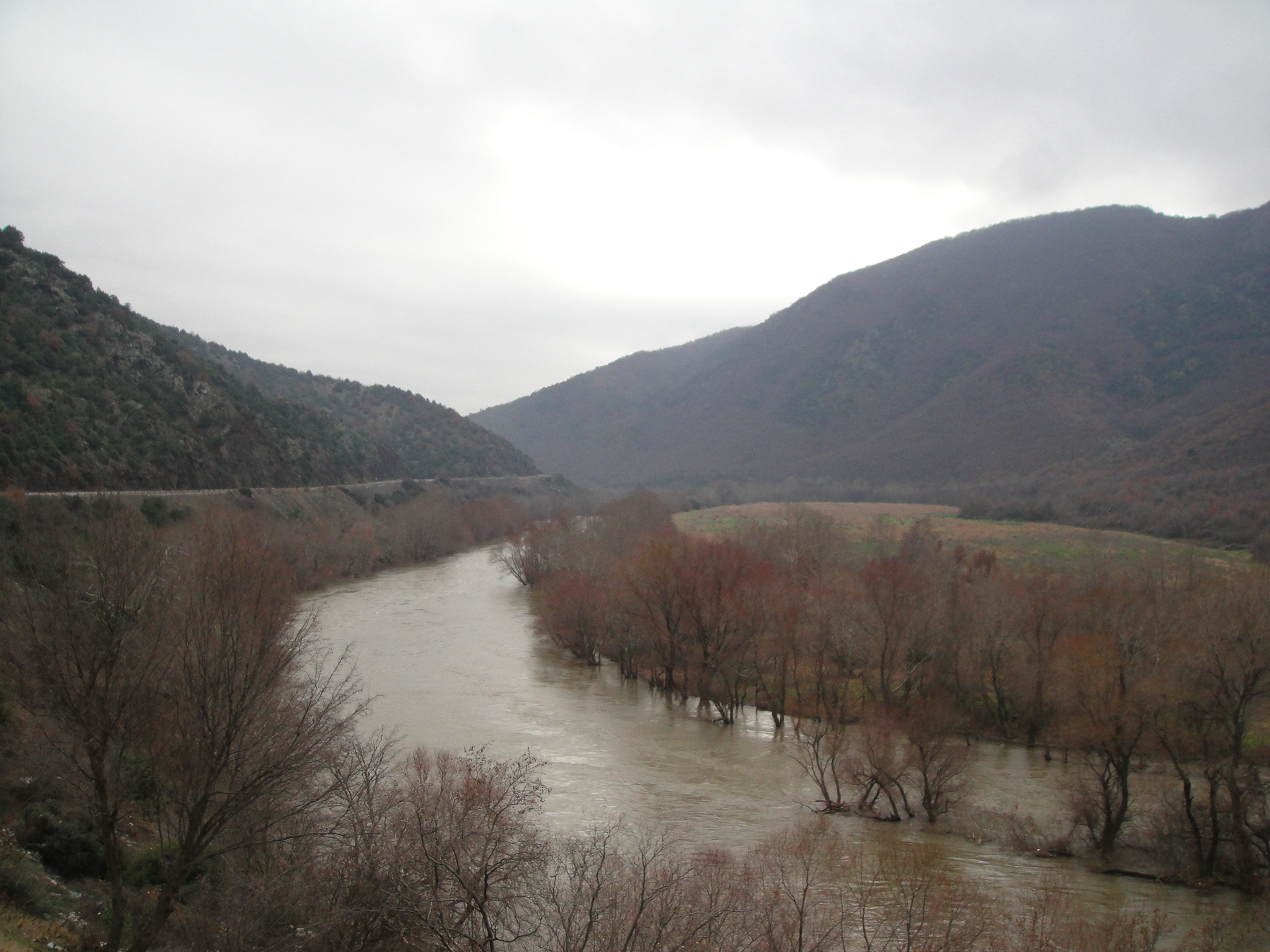
River Vardar near Gradsko (2)

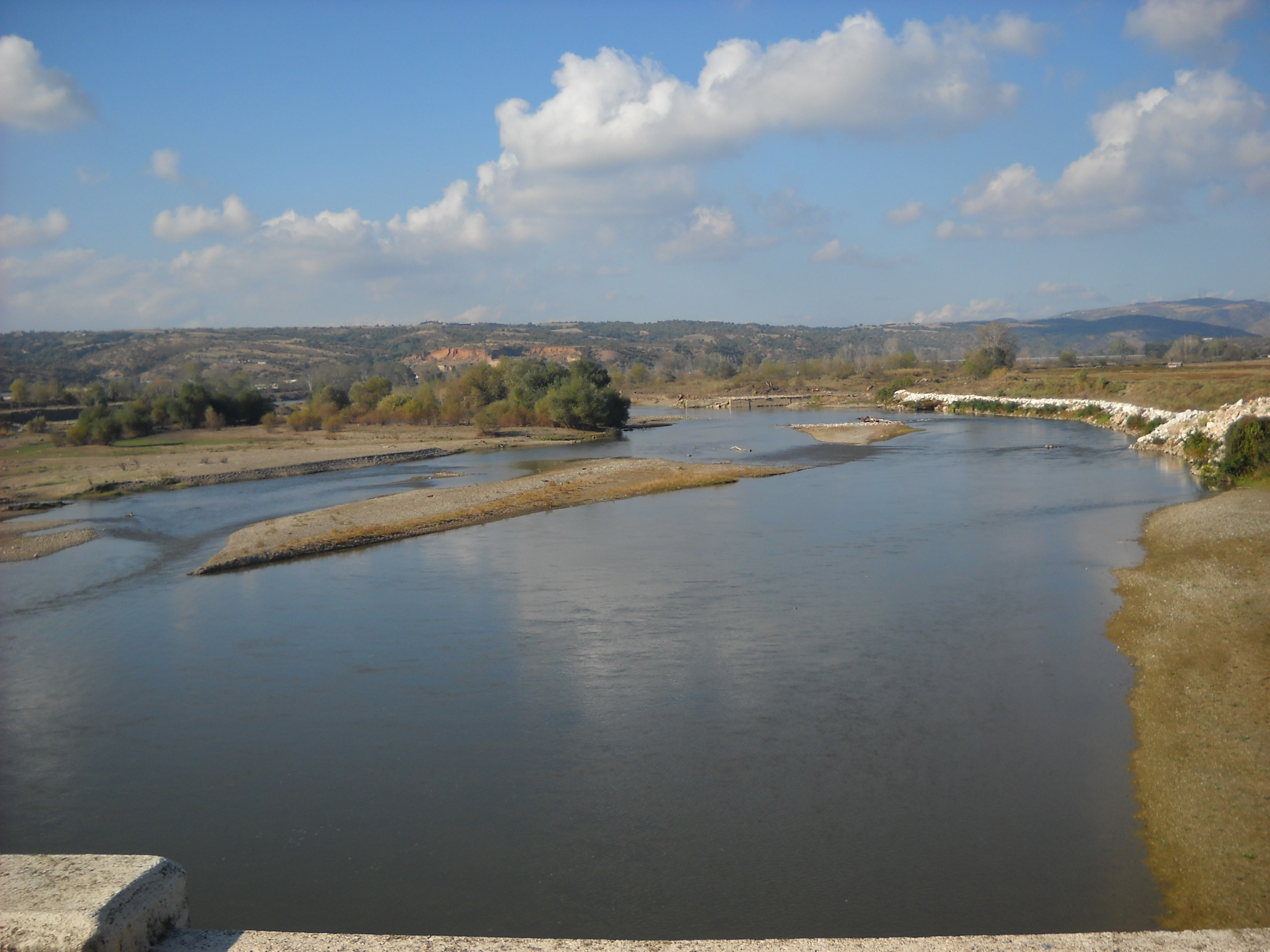
Vardar (Axios) river in Greece

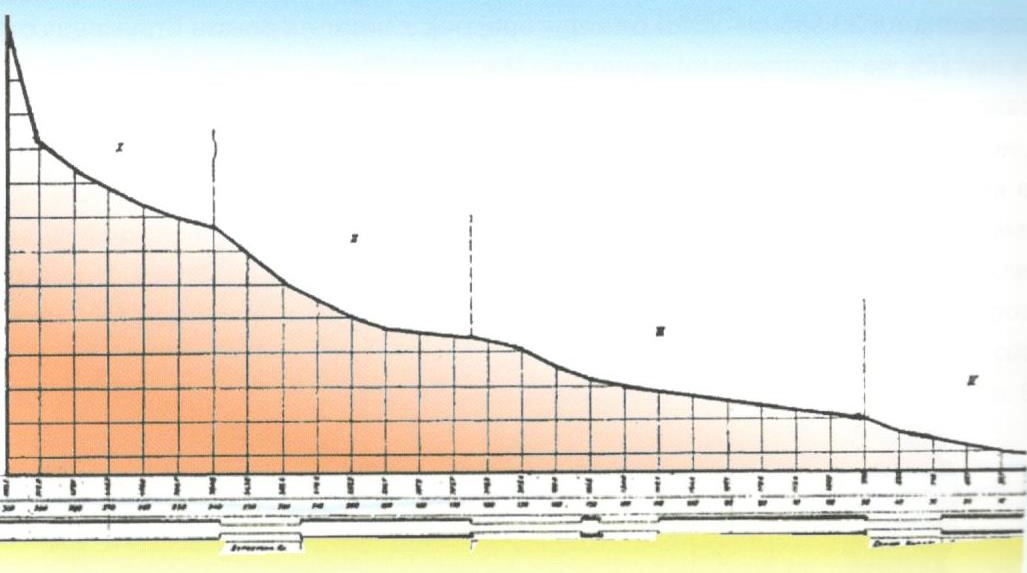
Longitudinal hydrographic profile of the flow of river Vardar

== See also ==
- Great Morava
- Pčinja River
- Vardar Macedonia
- Vardar Banovina
- Vardar Statistical Region
- Vardariotai
- Paionia
