= Vrutok =

Vrutok Вруток Vërtok
- Village
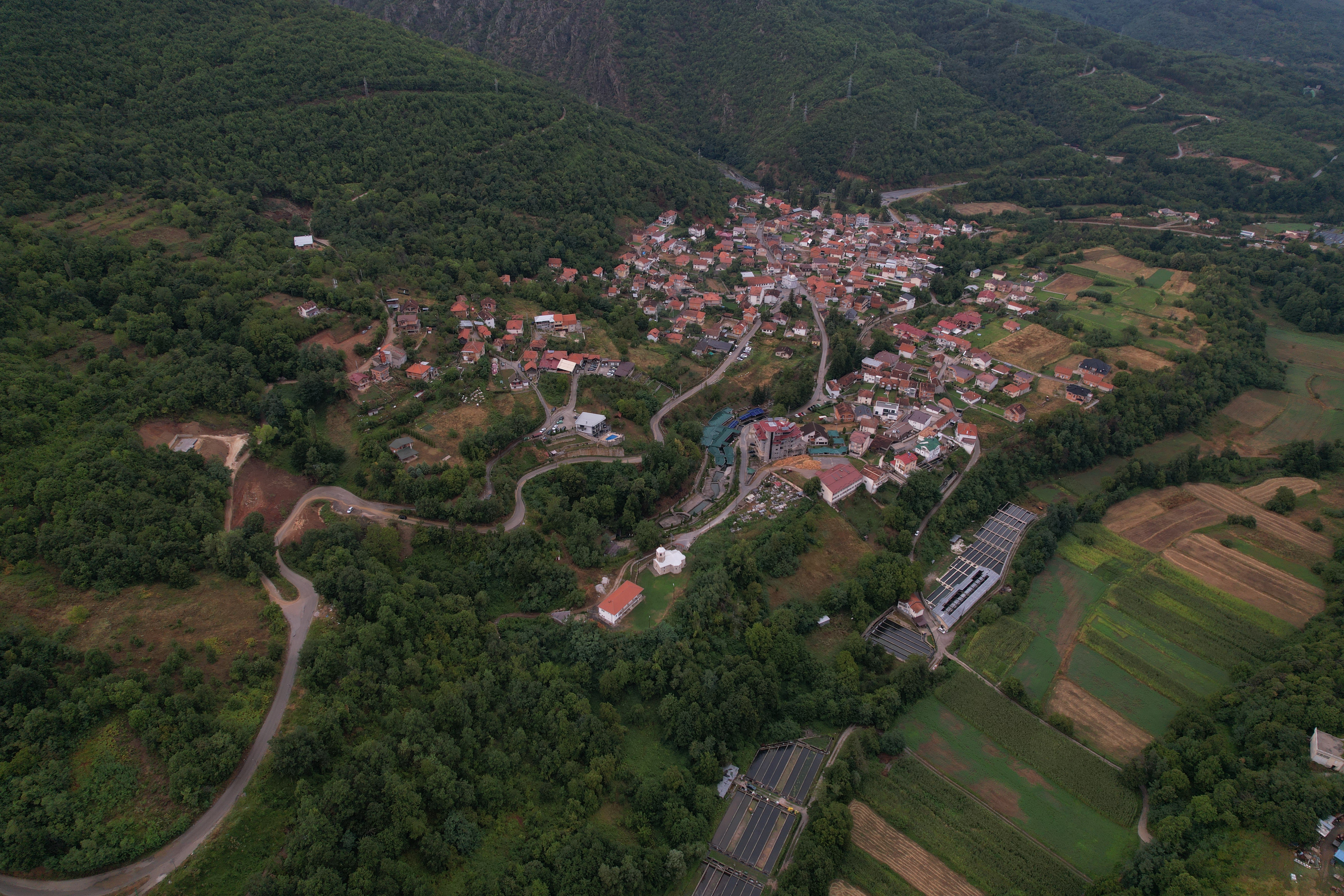
- Airview of the village Vrutok

- Location within North Macedonia
- Coordinates: 41°46′N 20°50′E
- Country: North Macedonia
- Region: Polog
- Municipality: Gostivar

Population (2021)
  - Total: 640
- Time zone: UTC+1 (CET)
  - Summer (DST): UTC+2 (CEST)
- Car plates: GV
- Website: .

Vrutok (Macedonian: Вруток, Albanian: Vërtok) is a village in the municipality of Gostivar, North Macedonia. The village is situated on the slopes of Mount Bistra by the Korab mountains, near the town of Gostivar.

== Geography ==
Its importance belongs to the water streams where the river Vardar (388 km), a major river in North Macedonia and Greece, rises. Nearby is the hydro power plant Vrutok with 49 MW capacity.

== Demographics ==
Vrutok is attested in the 1467/68 Ottoman tax registry (defter) for the Nahiyah of Kalkandelen. The village had a total of 42 Christian households, 4 widows and 2 bachelors.

According to ethnographer Vasil Kanchov's data from 1900, the village was inhabited by 460 Christian Bulgarians, 300 Muslim Albanians and 24 Roma people.

According to the 1942 Albanian census, Vrutok was inhabited by 929 Muslim Albanians, 128 Serbs and 150 Bulgarians.

As of the 2021 census, Vrutok had 640 residents with the following ethnic composition:

- Albanians 369
- Macedonians 203
- Persons for whom data are taken from administrative sources 56
- Turks 9
- Others 3

According to the 2002 census, the village had a total of 1127 inhabitants. Ethnic groups in the village include:

- Albanians 846
- Macedonians 276
- Serbs 3
- Others 2

== Notable people ==
- Jovan Trifunoski, geographer and anthropologist
