= Gorna Arda Hydro Power Plant =

Gorna Arda Hydro Power Company
- Country: Bulgaria
- Location: Gorna Arda
- Status: Under construction
- Owner: EVN NEK

Thermal power station
- Primary fuel: Hydropower

Power generation
- Nameplate capacity: up to 170 MW

Hydro Power Company Gorna Arda is a Bulgarian company, established in 1999 by the National Electricity Company and the Turkish Ceylan Holding. It was established after the signing of an intergovernmental agreement between Bulgaria and Turkey for a long-term barter. The Turkish side constructs roads and a cascade of hydropower plants in Bulgaria, and Bulgaria exports energy in return.

Three hydro power plants are foreseen to be included in the cascade (Madan, Sarnitsa and Ardino), placed on the upper stream of Arda river. The groundbreaking was made in the end of 1999, planning to finish the construction of the cascade in 2006. Soon after that the project was frozen due to contradictions between the shareholders.

In 2008 the Austrian company EVN expressed its interest in the Gorna Arda project. The company operates on the Bulgarian market since 2005 executing business activities in the field of distribution and trade of electricity in South-Eastern Bulgaria.

On September 2, 2009, the government of the Republic of Bulgaria appointed Hydro Power Company Gorna Arda AD as the investor in the Gorna Arda Cascade. The Council of Ministers approved a letter of support for the realization of the investment project. This letter is not a state guarantee, does not burden the state budget and does not raise any financial obligations for the state. NEK, EVN and Alpine Bau expressed their wish to be shareholders in HEC Gorna Arda. In the beginning of 2010 Аlpine Bau reviewed its business development plans and decided to withdraw from the project. Thus only shareholders in the project left NEK and EVN. On July 19, 2010, in the Bulgarian Embassy in Vienna, in the presence of the Bulgarian Prime Minister Mr. Boyko Borissov, shareholders agreement for construction and operation of hydro power cascade Gorna Arda was signed. This contract arranged the collaboration base between NEK and EVN. On behalf Bulgaria the document was signed by Krasimir Parvanov, the CEO of NEK EAD, and on behalf of Austria it was signed by Burkhard Hofer, chairperson of the board of directors in EVN.

The establishment of the new company proves the will of EVN and NEK to restore a long time planned project for a hydro power cascade on the upper stream of Arda river in South-Eastern Bulgaria. At the moment the work is based on the technical redesign. The plan is in the region of Madan, Ardino and Kitnitsa to be constructed plants with total capacity up to 170 MW. Up to 350 GWh per year electricity will come from those plants in the Bulgarian network, this amount covers the electricity needs of over 100 000 households.

This hydro power project is an important step towards using of renewable energy sources in Bulgaria. By 2020 16% of the electricity produced in Bulgaria should be from renewable energy sources. A successful implementation of Gorna Arda project could provide a specific contribution.

Furthermore, the flexible production of energy from hydro power plants will contribute to the stability of the electricity supply in Bulgaria.
