= MEPSO =

State-owned utility company in North Macedonia

- Native name: МЕПСО – Македонски електропреносен систем оператор
- Romanized name: Makedonski elektroprenosen sistem operator
- Company type: Transmission system operator
- Industry: Electric utility
- Predecessor: Elektrostopanstvo na Makedonija
- Founded: 2005
- Headquarters: Skopje, North Macedonia
- Key people: Nenad Jovanovski
- Owner: Government of North Macedonia
- Website: mepso.com.mk

MEPSO Macedonian Electricity Transmission System Operator (Macedonian: МЕПСО – Македонски електропреносен систем оператор) is a state-owned transmission system operator company for electricity with headquarters in Skopje, North Macedonia. It was founded in 2005, after being split from Elektrostopanstvo na Makedonija (ESM) and it is specialized in the transmission of electrical power. It is a member of the European Network of Transmission System Operators for Electricity.

== History ==
In 2005, the former state monopoly ESM (ЕСМ – Електростопанство на Македонија [Elektrostopanstvo na Makedonija], litt. Electricity of Macedonia) was split in three companies:

- A state-owned transmission system operator MEPSO
- A state-owned power-producing company, initially called ELEM (ЕЛЕМ – Електрани на Македонија [Elektrani na Makedonija], litt. Power plants of Macedonia), in charge of the country's power plants.
- A distribution and supply company, initially called ESM AD, sold in 2006 to Austrian EVN Group and renamed as EVN Macedonia (EВН Македонија), rebranded in 2019 as EVN AD Skopje (ЕВН АД Скопје).

== Organization and management of MEPSO ==
The Macedonian Electricity Transmission System (MEPSO) is a joint stock company fully owned by the Government of the Republic of Macedonia. The company was established by the Law on Transformation of the Electricity Company of Macedonia from 2004, which split the former state monopoly in 3 companies for production, transport and distribution. MEPSO manages the transmission network at 400 kV and 110 kV voltage level, with a total length of 2,021 km. MEPSO is a member of the European Association of System Operators ENTSO-E. The position of General Director was held by: Nenad Jovanovski, Sinisa Spasov, etc.

== Occupation ==
The main activity of MEPSO is to provide uninterrupted transmission of electricity through the transmission network and management of the power system, in order to ensure reliable supply of consumers with quality electricity. MEPSO has two licenses, issued by the National Energy Regulatory Commission, the first of which is the Transmission System Operator, and the second is the Electricity Market Operator (OPEE).

== Financial statements and indicators ==
As of December 31, 2015, the total assets of MEPSO amounted to 10,153,350,000 denars, most of which were real estate, plant and equipment (7,845,072,000 denars) and current assets (2,290,181,000 denars). On the other hand, the company MEPSO had total liabilities in the amount of 5,269,984,000 denars, while the total capital and reserves amounted to 4,883,366,000 denars (of which the share capital amounted to 3,059,393,000 denars). Regarding the income statement, in 2015, the company MEPSO generated revenues from the sale of electricity in the amount of 5,121,133,000 denars, operating profit amounted to 816,906,000 denars, and profit after tax 705,181,000 denars. In 2014, the profit after tax was 501,452,000 denars.
