= REK Bitola =

Coal-fired power plant in North Macedonia

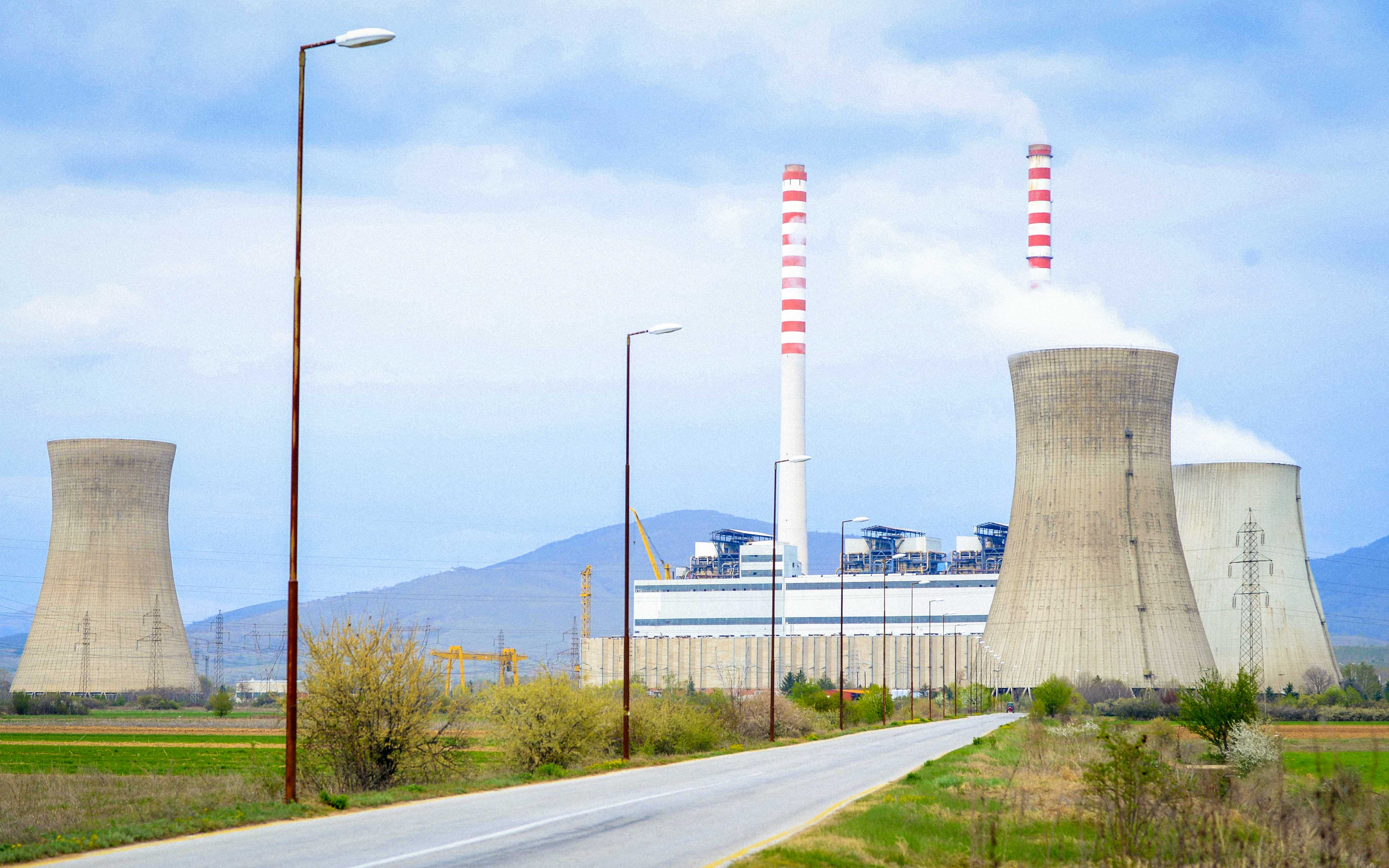
- View on REK Bitola's thermal power plant, April 2019
- Country: North Macedonia
- Location: Novaci Municipality, North Macedonia
- Coordinates: 41°03′29″N 21°29′00″E
- Status: Operational
- Commission date: Unit 1: 1984; Unit 2: 1984; Unit 3: 1988
- Owner: Elektrani na Severna Makedonija (ESM)

Power generation
- Units operational: 3
- Nameplate capacity: 699 MW (2024)
- Annual net output: 2,071 GWh (2024)

External links
- Commons: Related media on Commons

Mining and Energy Combine Bitola (Macedonian: Рударско-енергетски комбинат Битола), abbr. MEC Bitola (РЕК Битола, REK Bitola) is an organizational unit of Elektrani na Severna Makedonija (ESM), located in Novaci Municipality, near the city of Bitola, North Macedonia.

MEC Bitola operates both coal (lignite) mines Suvodol coal mine and Brod-Gneotino coal mine, along with a large coal power plant "TPP Bitola", situated about 12 kilometres (7.5 mi) from Bitola. As the water cooling primary source, the power plant uses the nearby Streževo Lake; the other water cooling sources are Suvodol Reservoir and Crna River.

The power plant is the primary source of electrical power in North Macedonia, providing for 59.78% of the country's electricity production (as of 2024). The plant, which was built from 1982 to 1988, generates around 2,071 million GWh of electricity per year (as of 2024). It is regulated by the Balkan Environmental Regulatory Compliance and Enforcement Network (BERCEN).

== History ==
The production at the plant began in 1980, with the excavation of tailings from the first BTO system (excavator, track, delayer), and the first kilowatt-hours of electricity were obtained in 1982 when the first of the three units of the power plant was put into operation. The production is enabled by three blocks whose power with the reconstruction in 1994 has increased by an additional 15 megawatts per block or for a total of 45 megawatts.

In 2009, the modernization of the turbines and generators of REK Bitola (performed by the Russian company "Silovie Machines") began, which was completed in 2013, which increased the installed capacity of 675 megawatt hours by 25 megawatt hours. At the same time, in 2011 an agreement was signed with the German company "Babkok Borsig" for revitalization of the boilers in order to extend the life of the thermal power plant for 120,000 working hours, but this project was not completed due to a dispute between the two parties. Although a loan of 80 million euros was provided for this project, Elektrani na Severna Makedonija (ESM) terminated the contract with Babcock Borsig, so that the modernization of the boilers remained unfinished. Only, during 2012 and 2013, boilers 2 and 3 were modernized, reducing nitrogen oxide emissions, in accordance with EU environmental standards. However, this modernization did not achieve the planned increase in their capacity.

In 2023, REK Bitola thermal plant (TPP) was reconnected to the 233-megawatt grid after being in maintenance since 2020.

== Production ==
The potential in REK Bitola enables over 70% participation of the plant in the total production of electricity in the power system. In 2005, the production of electricity in REK Bitola reached 5,007 gigawatt hours, but already in the following year the production dropped to 4,691 gigawatt hours, and the bottom was reached in 2015, when the production was only 3,138 gigawatt hours.

== See also ==
- List of power stations in North Macedonia
