= Tikveš Hydroelectric Power Station =

Tikveš Dam
- Location within North Macedonia
- Country: North Macedonia
- Location: Kavadarci Municipality
- Coordinates: 41°24′11″N 21°56′16″E
- Purpose: Power, irrigation
- Status: Operational
- Construction began: 1964
- Opening date: 1968; 58 years ago
- Owner: Power plants of North Macedonia (ESM)

Dam and spillways
- Type of dam: Embankment, rock-fill
- Impounds: Crna River
- Height: 113.5 m (372 ft)
- Length: 338 m (1,109 ft)

Reservoir
- Total capacity: 475,000,000 m^{3} (385,000 acre⋅ft)
- Active capacity: 309,600,000 m^{3} (251,000 acre⋅ft)
- Catchment area: 5,361 km^{2} (2,070 mi^{2})

Power Station
- Commission date: 1968/1981
- Hydraulic head: 91.3 m (300 ft)
- Turbines: 4 x 23 MW Francis-type
- Annual generation: 184 GWh

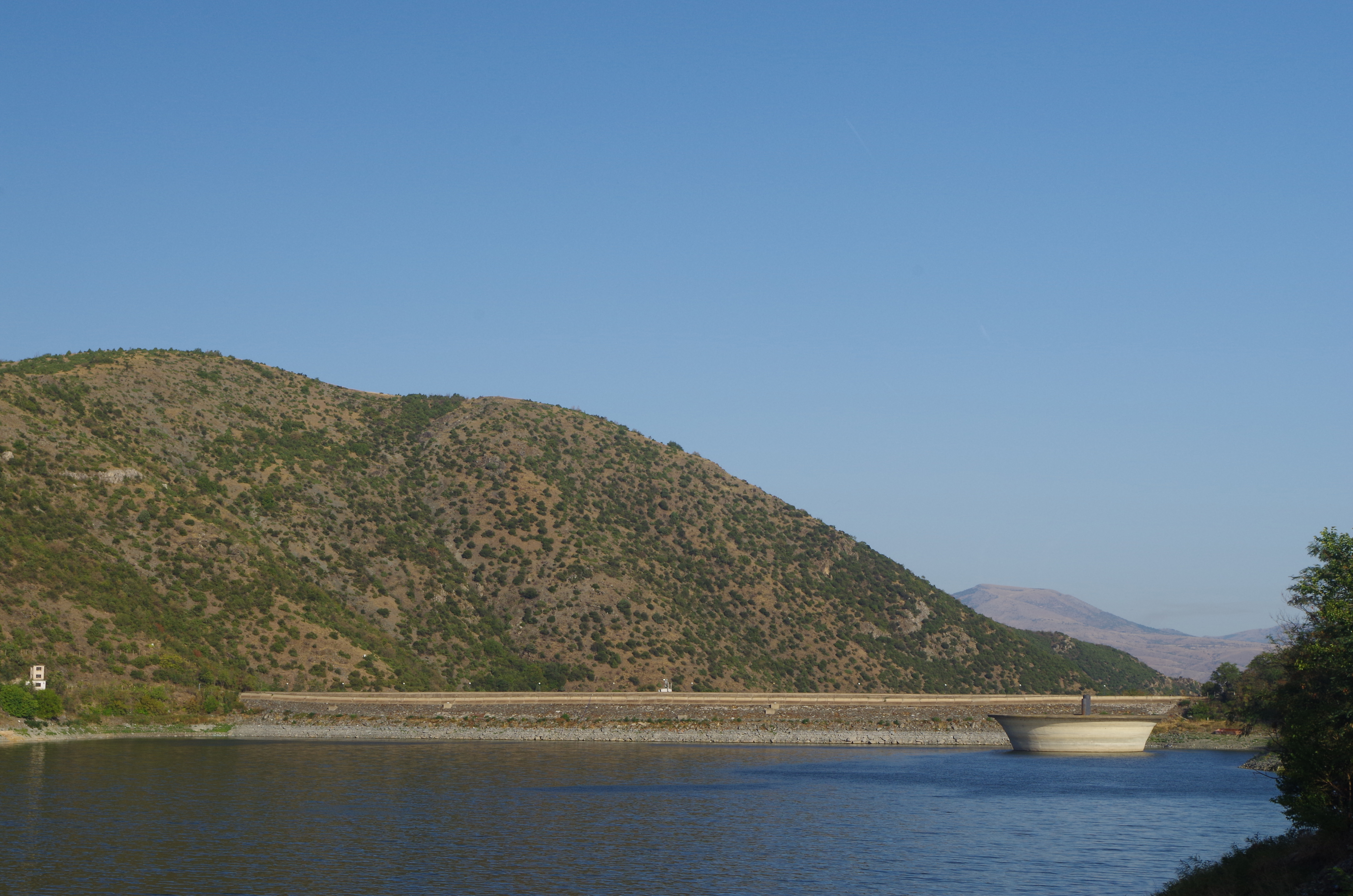
The power station’s dam

Tikveš Hydro Power Plant is a large power plant in Kavadarci Municipality, North Macedonia that has two turbines with a nominal capacity of 46 MW each having a total capacity of 92 MW. The dam for the power station is located on the Crna River and is 113.5 m (372 ft) high. The purpose of the dam is to store water for irrigation but also to generate power.
