= Elektrani na Severna Makedonija =

- Native name: ЕСМ - Електрани на Северна Македонија; EMV - Elektranat e Maqedonisë së Veriut
- Formerly: ESM (1990-2005); ELEM (2005-2019)
- Founded: 1945
- Headquarters: North Macedonia
- Key people: Llazo Uzunchev
- Revenue: 259,116,000 euro (2021)
- Operating income: 13,808,000 euro (2021)
- Net income: −28,101,000 euro (2021)
- Owner: Government of North Macedonia
- Number of employees: 4,892 (2016)
- Divisions: MPC Bitola, MPC Oslomej, HPS Mavrovo, HPS Crn Drim, HPP Tikves, HPS Treska, Energetika
- Website: www.esm.com.mk

Elektrani na Severna Makedonija or ESM (Macedonian: Електрани на Северна Македонија, ЕСМ; Albanian: Elektranat e Maqedonisë së Veriut, EMV, lit. "Power plants of North Macedonia") is a government-owned electricity producing company in North Macedonia.

== History ==
In 2005, the former state monopoly ESM (ЕСМ - Електростопанство на Македонија [Elektrostopanstvo na Makedonija], litt. Electricity of Macedonia) was split in three companies:

- A state-owned power-producing company ELEM (ЕЛЕМ - Електрани на Македонија [Elektrani na Makedonija], litt. Power plants of Macedonia), in charge of the country's power plants
- A distribution and supply company, initially called ESM AD, sold in 2006 to Austrian EVN Group and renamed as EVN Macedonia (EВН Македонија), rebranded in 2019 as EVN AD Skopje (ЕВН АД Скопје).
- A state-owned transmission system operator MEPSO

In March 2019, ELEM was renamed as ESM (Power plants of North Macedonia) after the country renamed itself as North Macedonia with the implementation of the Prespa agreement, reverting to the previous initialism used between 1990 and 2006.

== Structure ==
As of 2020, ESM has the following operations:

- Power production facilities
  - TPP Bitola, coal (lignite) mine and power plant combine, which runs the Suvodol coal mine and Brod-Gneotino coal mine and produces 59.78% of the electricity of the country
  - TPP Oslomej, coal (lignite) mine and power plant combine, which runs the Oslomej coal mine
  - Mavrovo Hydroelectric System, operating the Raven, Vrben and Vrutok Hydroelectric Power Stations
  - Tikveš Hydroelectric Power Station
  - Black Drin Hydroelectric System, including the Globočica and Spilje Hydro Power Plants
  - Treska Hydroelectric System, including the Kozjak and Sveta Petka hydro power plants
  - Energetika, a natural gas facility providing electricity, steam and heating water to the ironworks complex in Zelezara (Skopje)
- Other companies
  - ELEM Tours (ELEM TURS): tourism, catering, recreation and sport
  - ELEM Trade (ELEM TREJD)
  - FOD Bitola: factory equipment and parts
  - FORD Oslomej: factory maintenance, overhaul and transport
