= Špilje Hydro Power Plant =

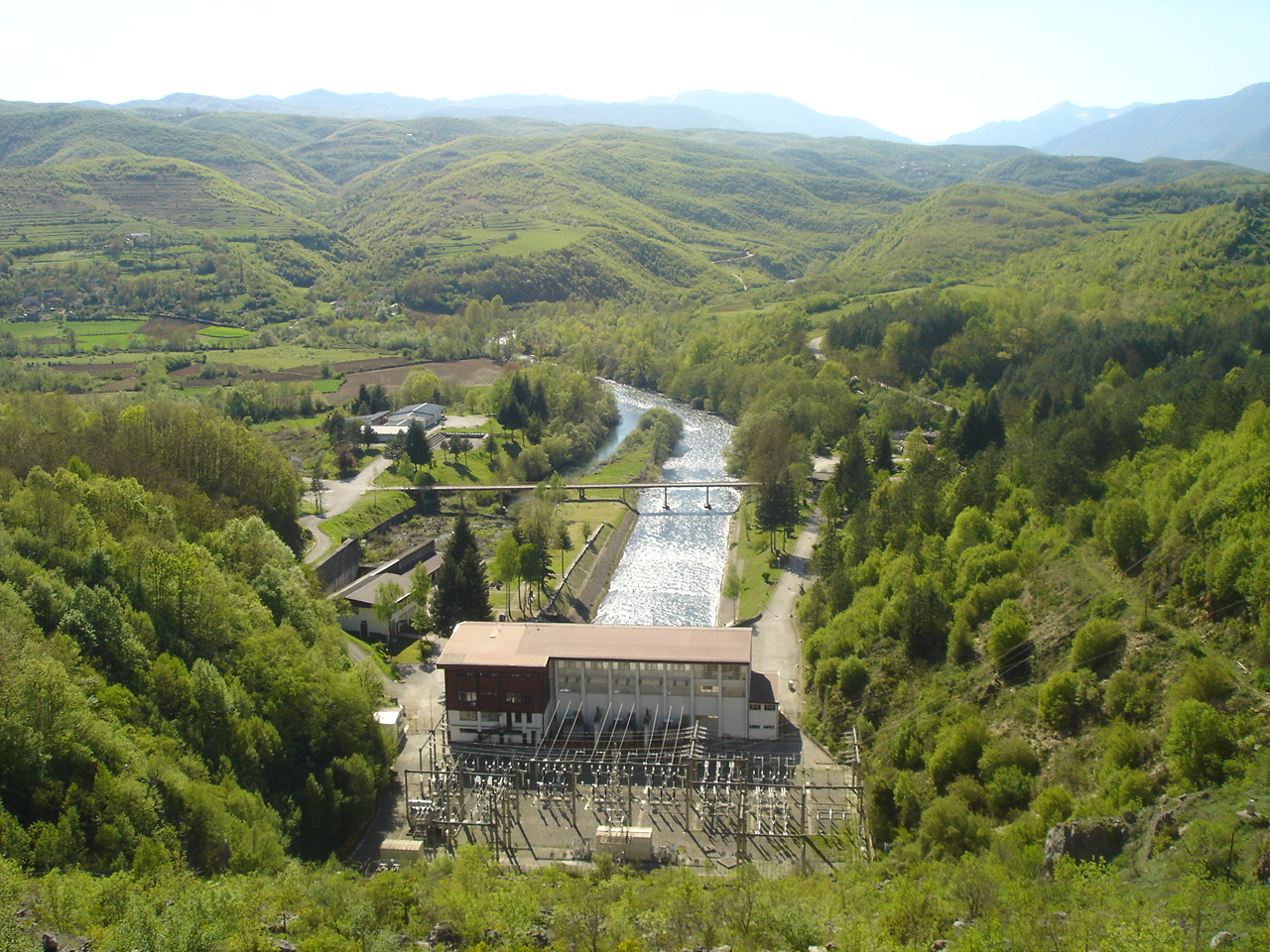
- Interactive map of Špilje Hydro Power Plant
- Country: North Macedonia
- Location: Špilje, North Macedonia
- Coordinates: 41.4934°N 20.5029°E
- Opening date: 1969
- Owner: Power plants of North Macedonia (ESM)

Upper reservoir
- Creates: Debar Lake

Lower dam and spillways
- Height (foundation): 112 m

Špilje Hydro Power Plant
- Turbines: 3 Francis turbines
- Installed capacity: 84 MW
- Annual generation: 272 GWh
- Website; Power Plants of North Macedonia - HPP Špilje

Špilje Hydro Power Plant is a power plant in North Macedonia with an installed capacity of 84 MW. The Hydro Power Plant has an average annual production of 272 GWh and is equipped with 3 Francis turbines.
