= Božinovski =

Božinovski (Macedonian: Божиновски)(also Bozhinovski or Bozinovski) is a Macedonian surname:

- Vlado Bozinovski (born 1964), Australian footballer.
- Vasko Božinovski (born 1975), Macedonian footballer.
- Matthew Bozinovski (born 2001), Macedonian-Australian footballer

The Bulgarian form is Bozhinov.
