= Vrutok Hydroelectric Power Station =

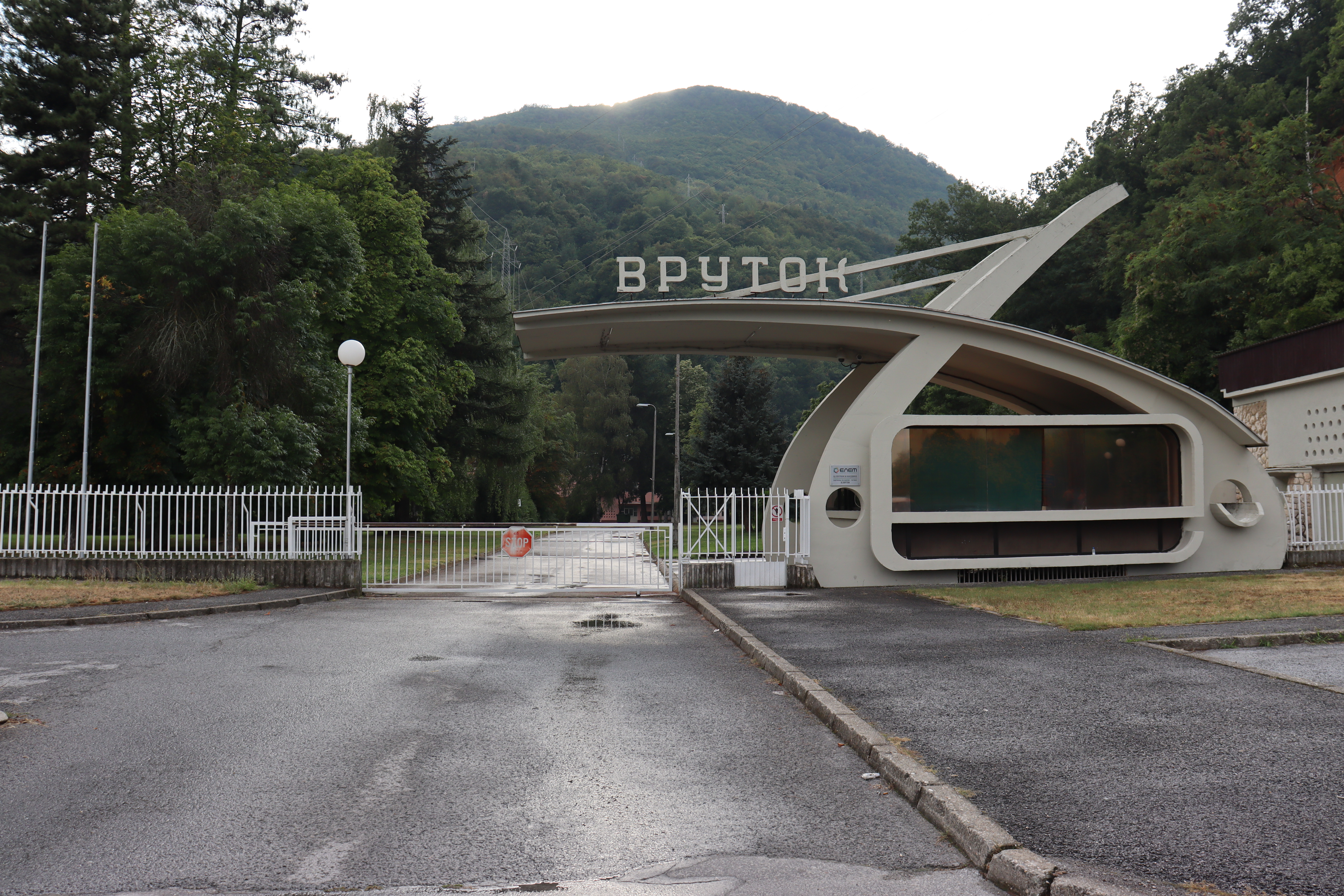
- Interactive map of Vrutok Hydroelectric Power Station
- Country: North Macedonia
- Location: Vrutok, North Macedonia
- Owner: Power plants of North Macedonia (ESM)

Reservoir
- Creates: Vrutok

Vrutok Hydroelectric Power Station

Vrutok Hydro Power Plant is a large power plant in North Macedonia that has four turbines with a nominal capacity of 49 MVA each having a total capacity of 162 MW.
