= Micevski =

Micevski is a Macedonian surname, it may refer to:

- Darko Micevski, Macedonian footballer
- David Micevski, Australian footballer
- Mike Micevski, Australian footballer
- Toni Micevski, Macedonian footballer
- Vančo Micevski, Macedonian footballer
- Ethan Page (Julian Micevski), Canadian professional wrestler
- Kiril Micevski, Macedonian university professor, biologist and botanist, member of the Macedonian Academy of Sciences and Arts.
