= Naumovski =

Naumovski (Macedonian: Наумовски) is a surname. Notable people with the surname include:

- Kristijan Naumovski (born 1988), Macedonian footballer
- Lou Naumovski (born 1957), Canadian businessman
- Vasko Naumovski (born 1980), Macedonian diplomat and politician
