= Stefanovski =

Stefanovski (Macedonian Cyrillic:Стефановски) is a Macedonian surname meaning 'son of Stephen'. Stefanovic is the Serbian variant.

Notable Stefanovskis:

- Goran Stefanovski (1952–2018) Macedonian dramatist.
- Vlatko Stefanovski (born 1957) Macedonian guitarist.

== See also ==
- Stefan (disambiguation)
