= Kozjak Hydro Power Plant =

Kozjak Dam Брана Козјак Diga e Kozjakut
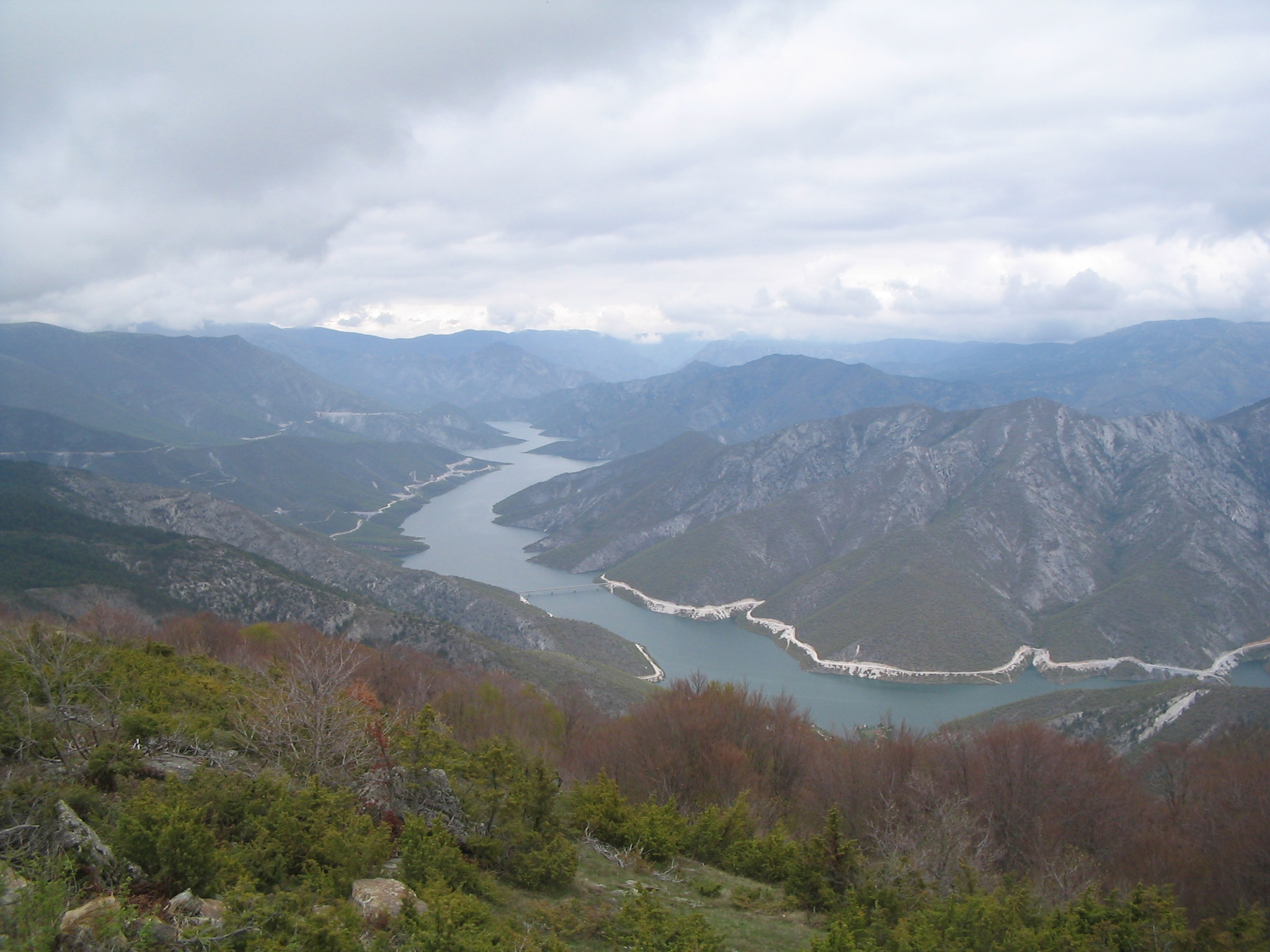
- Kozjak dam and lake, as seen from the Fojnik peak

- Location within North Macedonia
- Interactive map of Kozjak Dam; Брана Козјак; Diga e Kozjakut
- Country: North Macedonia
- Location: Kozjak
- Coordinates: 41°52′40″N 21°11′34″E
- Purpose: Flood control, power
- Status: Operational
- Construction began: 1994
- Opening date: 2000; 26 years ago
- Owner: Power plants of North Macedonia (ESM)

Dam and spillways
- Type of dam: Embankment, rock-fill
- Impounds: Treska
- Height (foundation): 130 m (430 ft)
- Height (thalweg): 114 m (374 ft)

Reservoir
- Total capacity: 380,000,000 m^{3} (310,000 acre⋅ft)
- Surface area: 13.5 km^{2} (5.2 mi^{2})
- Maximum length: 32 km (20 mi)
- Maximum width: 400 m (1,300 ft)

Power Station
- Commission date: 2004
- Turbines: 2 x 41 MW Francis-type
- Installed capacity: 82 MW

Kozjak Hydro Power Plant is a large hydroelectric power plant on the river Treska, which creates an artificial lake, Kozjak, the largest in North Macedonia. The impounded reservoir is stretched along municipalities of Želino, Brvenica and Makedonski Brod. The constructed Kozjak Dam is the tallest in the country at 130 m (430 ft). It is located in the western part of the country, in the village of Lukovica, part of Želino municipality. The primary purpose of the dam is flood control but it also serves for power generation.

The power plant has two turbines with a nominal capacity of 41 MW each having a total capacity of 82 MW.

The lake is 32 km (20 mi) long, with maximum depth of 130 m (430 ft). The maximum elevation of the lake is 469.9 m and it has a capacity of about 380 million m³ of water. There is an abundance of fish in the lake.

The construction of the dam started in August 1994 and it was complete in 2000. The reservoir started filling in May 2003, and the two power generators finally operated in July and September 2004.
