= EVN Macedonia =

- Native name: ЕВН Македонија; EVN Maqedonia
- Industry: Utilities
- Genre: Electricity generation, distribution and supply
- Predecessor: Elektrostopanstvo na Makedonija
- Founded: January 1, 2006; 20 years ago
- Headquarters: Skopje, North Macedonia
- Key people: Stefan Peter, Jürgen Fleischhacker, Sasho Stojkoski, Zoran Markovski
- Parent: EVN Group
- Subsidiaries: EVN Home, EVN Supply, EVN Elektrani, Elektrodistribucija
- Website: evn.mk

EVN Macedonia (Macedonian: ЕВН Македонија; Albanian: EVN Maqedonia) is a power distribution and supply company in North Macedonia. It was split in 2005 from former state integrated power company ESM and bought in 2006 by Austrian-based EVN Group. (Note: EVN originally stands for Energieversorgung Niederösterreich (German for "Lower Austria energie supply").) The company has about 800 000 electricity meters in the country.

== History ==
In 2005, the former state monopoly ESM (ЕСМ – Електростопанство на Македонија [Elektrostopanstvo na Makedonija], litt. Electricity of Macedonia) was split in three companies:

- A distribution and supply company, initially called ESM AD, sold in 2006 to Austrian EVN Group and renamed as EVN Macedonia (EВН Македонија).
- A state-owned power-producing company, initially called ELEM (ЕЛЕМ – Електрани на Македонија [Elektrani na Makedonija], litt. Power plants of Macedonia), in charge of the country's power plants. The company was renamed in 2019 as ESM (Elektrani na Severna Makedonija, ЕСМ - Електрани на Северна Македонија, litt. Power plants of North Macedonia) after the country itself changed its name to North Macedonia, reverting to the initialism used between 1990 and 2006.
- A state-owned transmission system operator MEPSO
