= EVN Group =

Austrian based producer of electricity

EVN AG
- Company type: Aktiengesellschaft
- Traded as: WBAG: EVN
- Industry: Utilities
- Founded: 1922
- Headquarters: Maria Enzersdorf, Lower Austria, Austria
- Key people: Stefan Syszkowitz (CEO), Stefan Stallinger (CTO), Alexandra Wittmann (CFO), Reinhard Wolf(Chair of the supervisory board)
- Products: Electricity generation and distribution, electricity and gas trading and wholesale, water treatment, waste management, renewable energy
- Revenue: €2.752 billion (2009/10)
- Operating income: €187.3 million (2009/10)
- Net income: €207.0 million (2009/10)
- Total assets: €6.731 billion (September 2010)
- Total equity: €3.025 billion (September 2010)
- Number of employees: 8,540 (September 2010)
- Subsidiaries: EVN Macedonia; EVN Bulgaria
- Website: www.evn.at

EVN Group is an Austrian-based producer and transporter of electricity, one of the largest in Europe having over three million customers in 14 countries. The company also operates in water treatment, natural gas supply and waste management business areas. It is the second-largest utility in Austria.

(The EVN brand, introduced at the beginning of 1988, stands for Energie-Versorgung Niederösterreich, or Lower Austrian Energy Supply.)

== Activities ==
In 2006, EVN Group produced around 3.45 billion kWh mainly from thermal power plants (68%) and renewable energy (hydro and wind) power plants (32%). EVN Group also distributed 19.2 billion kWh of electricity in Austria (37.9%), Bulgaria (37.95%, through subsidiary EVN Bulgaria) and North Macedonia (24.15%, through EVN Macedonia).

The company also has power generation capacities of 1,450 MW, a transmission network of 1,370 km and a distribution network of 45,000 km. EVN Group is also involved in the natural gas sector having a total network length of 10,100 km. EVN itself owns 12.5% of Austrian peer Verbund.

== Ownership ==
Less than 14% of EVN Group shares are free float on the Vienna Stock Exchange, with the state of Lower Austria holding 51 percent.

From 2002 until 2020, German utility EnBW owned around 35 percent of EVN Group. From 2015 on, EnBW reduced its share. In 2020, Wiener Stadtwerke became EVN’s second-largest shareholder after it bought EnBW’s remaining 28.35% stake, worth around 800 million euros ($894 million).

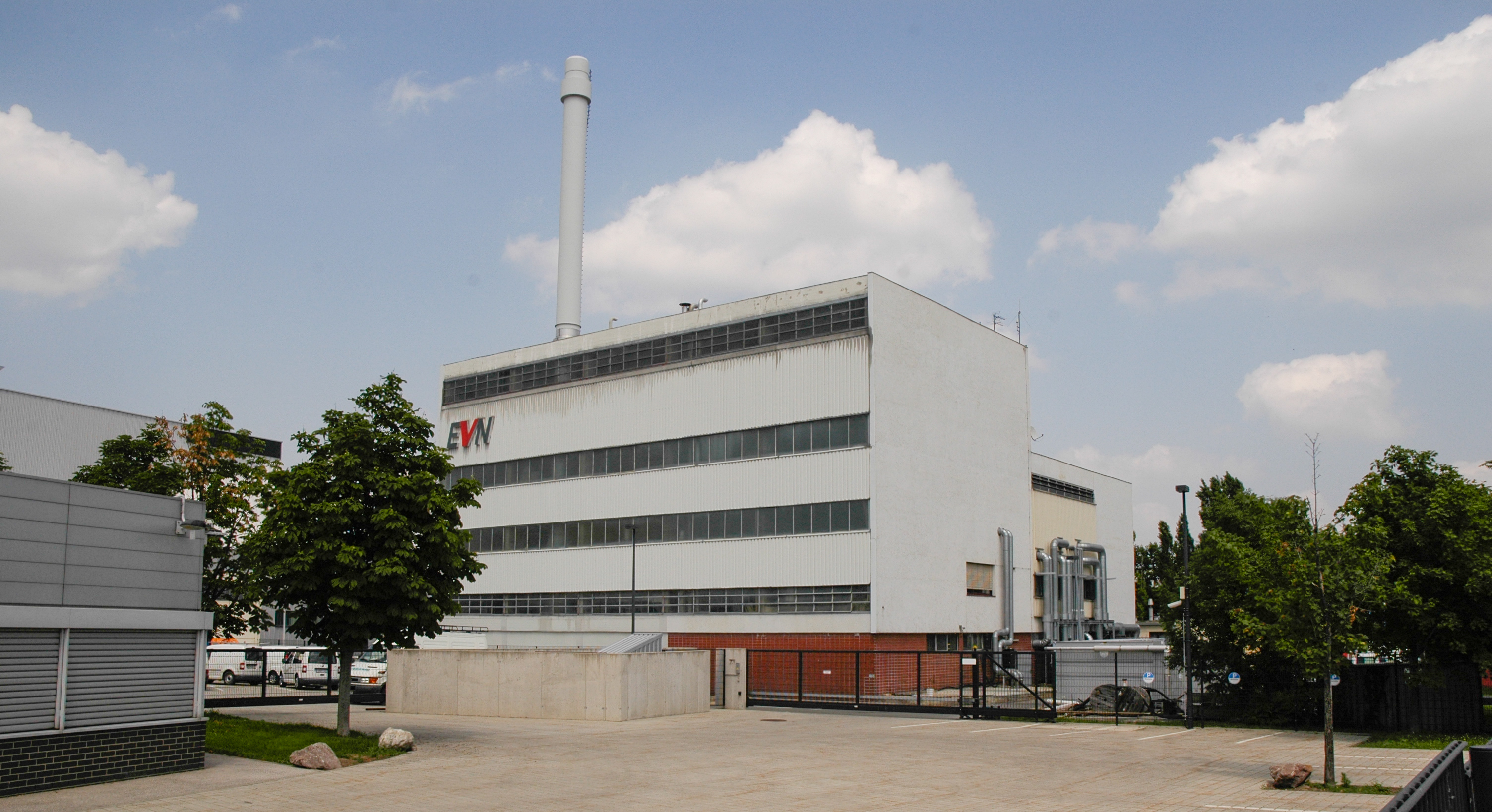
District heating plant Mödling erected 1960, gasfired

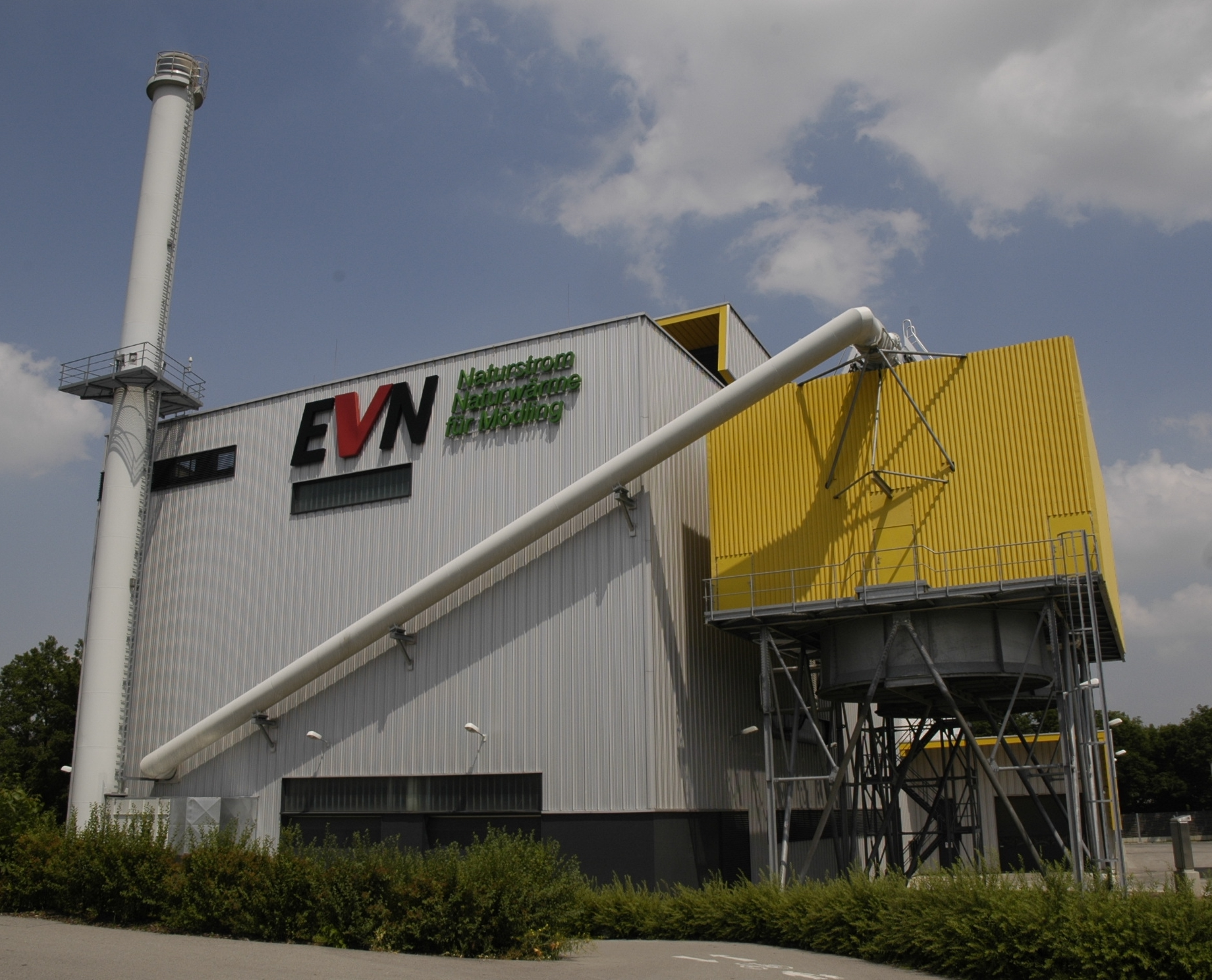
Biomass power and district heating plant Mödling, erected 2006

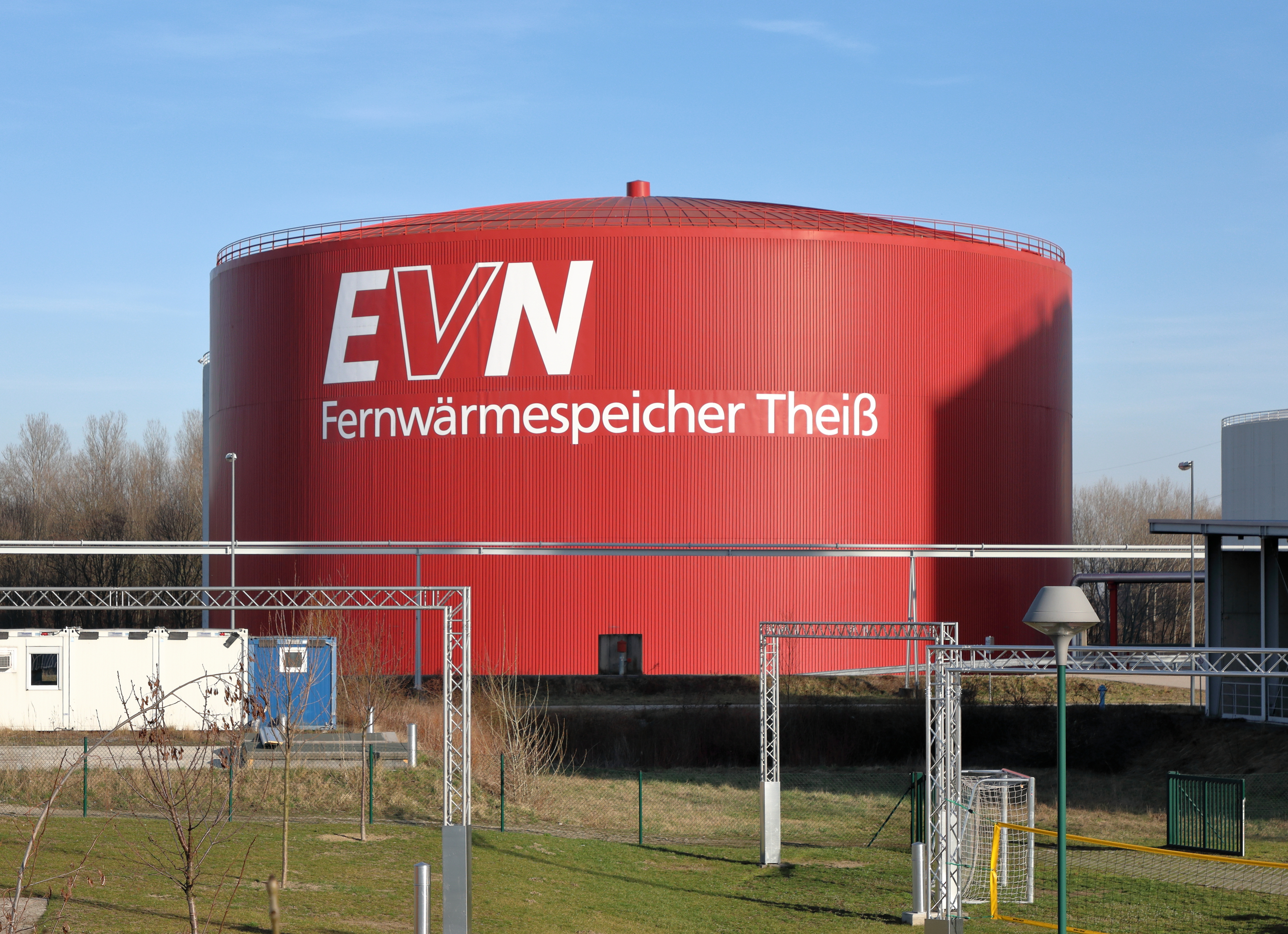
Europes biggest District Heating Accumulator with 50.000 cubic meter

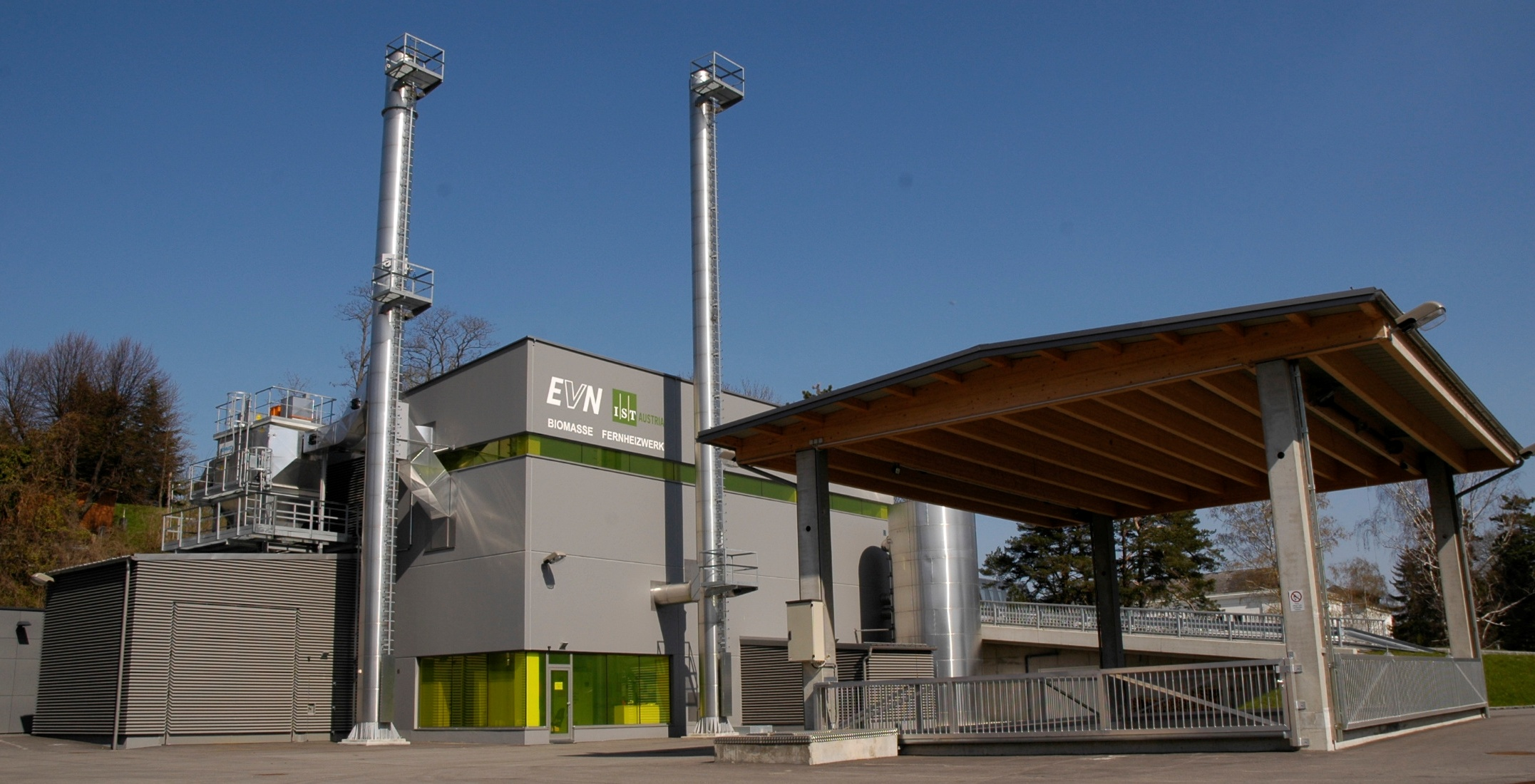
View from the biomasse heating plant Maria Gugging

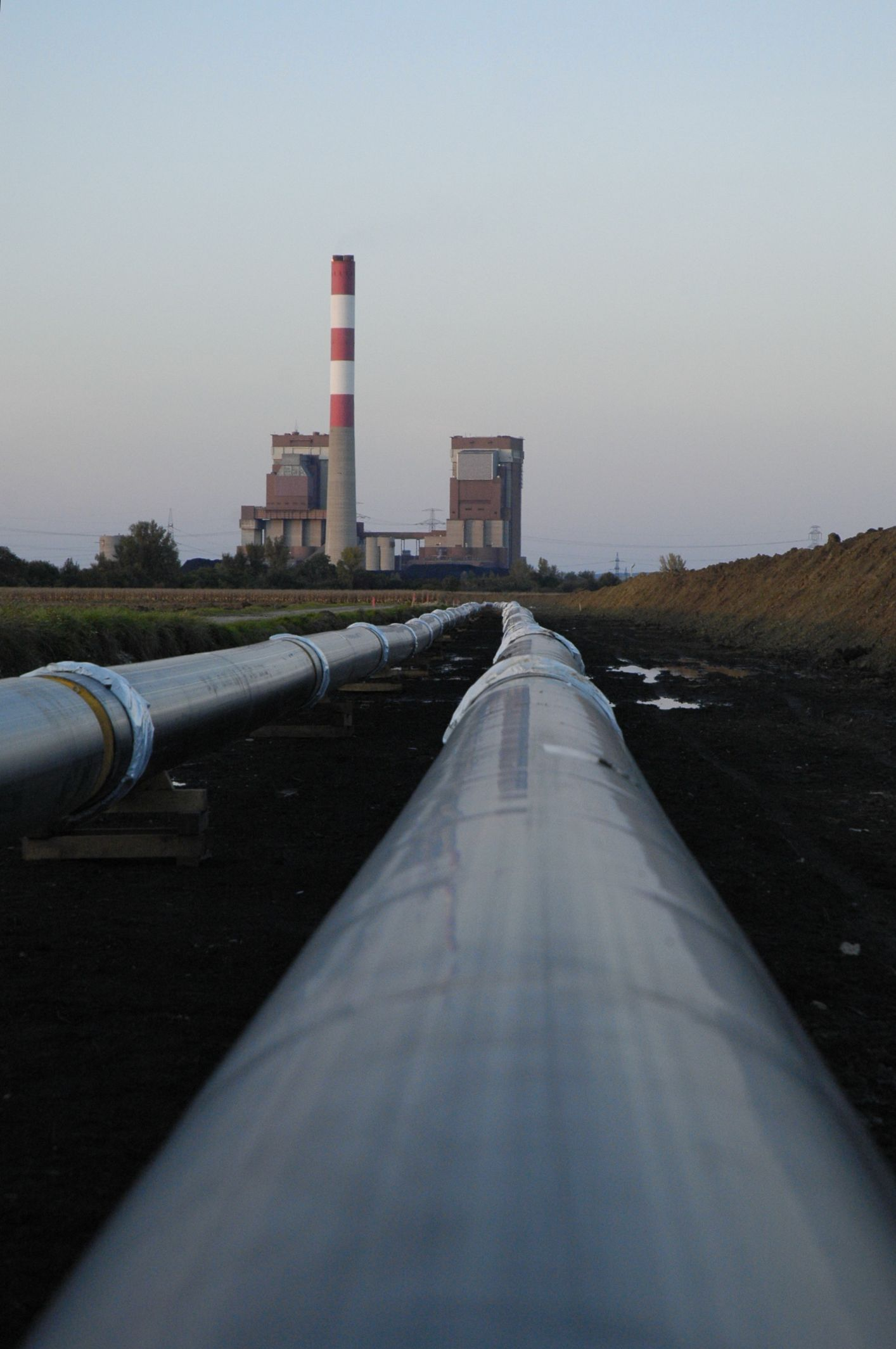
District heating transportation pipeline with a length of 31 km from Dürnrohr Power Station to Sankt Pölten

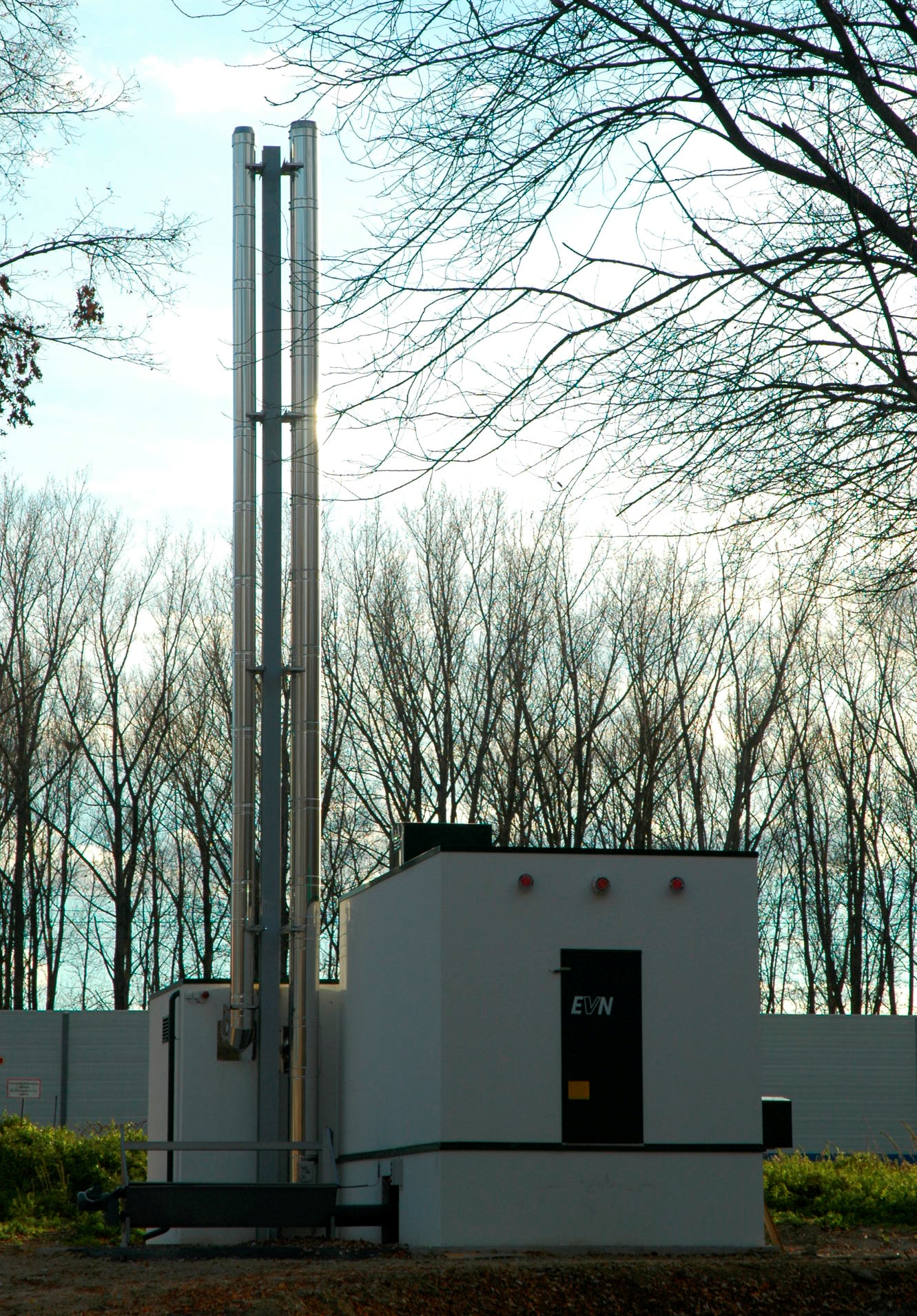
Biomass heating plant Modul for a village, from EVN Wärme, in the winter.

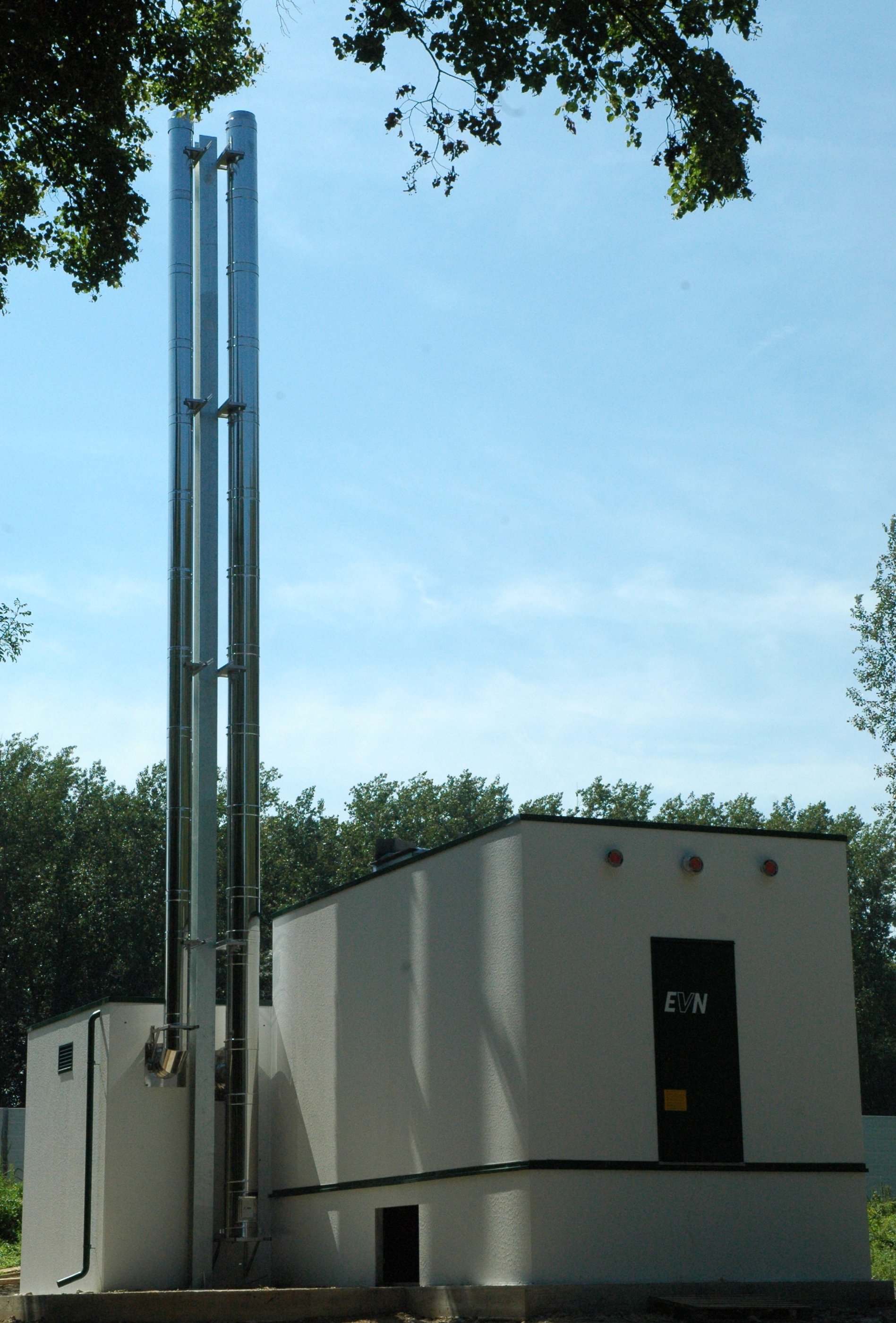
Biomass heating plant. The total heat power is about 1000 kW, in the summer.
