= Drevenik, North Macedonia =

Drevenik Древеник
- Village
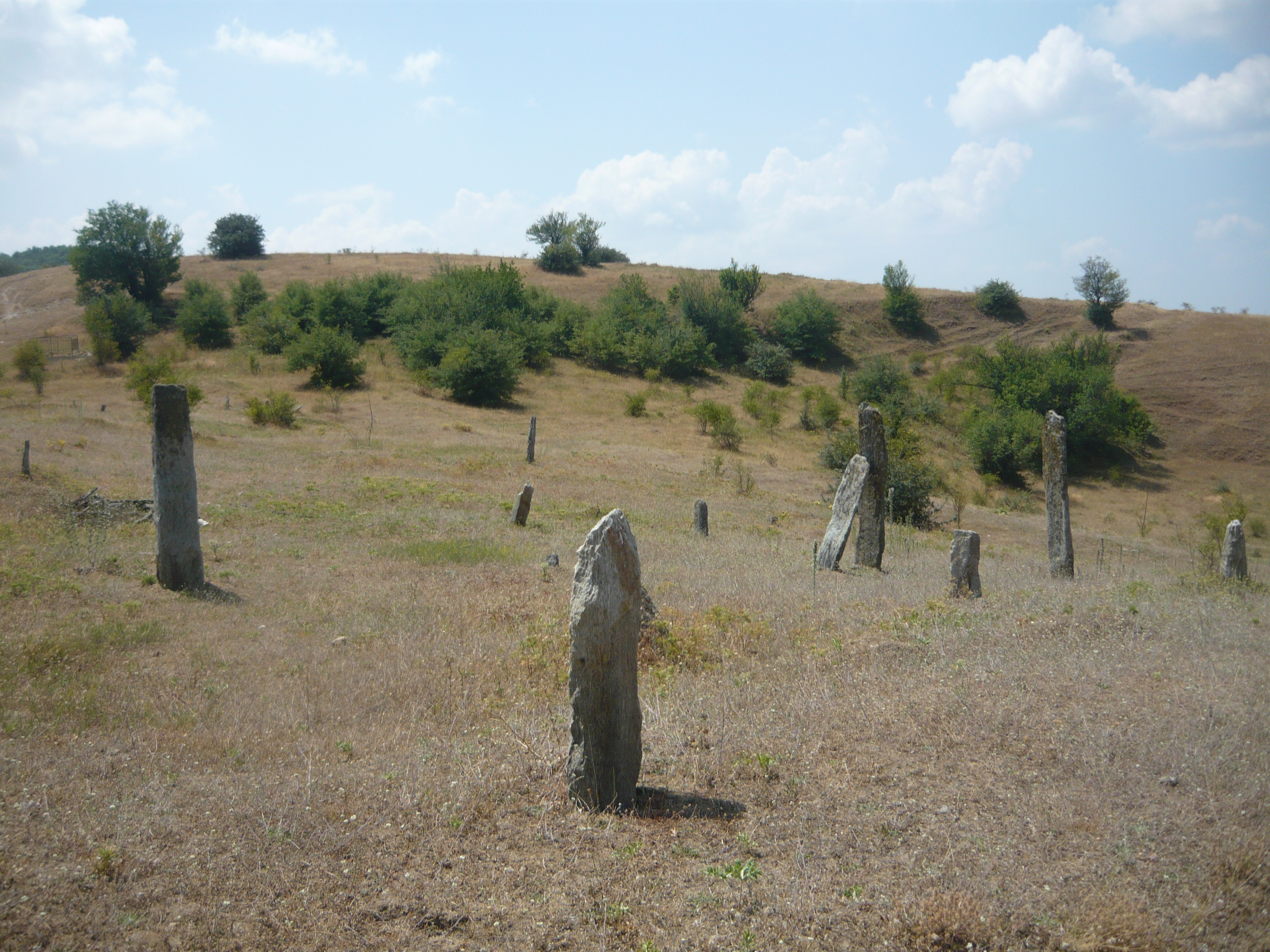

- Location within North Macedonia
- Coordinates: 41°12′N 21°18′E
- Country: North Macedonia
- Region: Pelagonia
- Municipality: Bitola

Population (2021)
  - Total: 3
- Time zone: UTC+1 (CET)
  - Summer (DST): UTC+2 (CEST)
- Car plates: BT
- Website: .

Drevenik (Macedonian: Древеник; Albanian: Drevenik) is a village in the municipality of Bitola, North Macedonia. It used to be part of the former municipality of Kukurečani.

== Geography ==
Drevenik is a mountainous village, located at the Dreven pass (after which it is named, a Slavic toponym derived from drvo, "tree")) of the Drevenik mountain, lying between the Bitola–Prilep valley and Demir-Hisar. The village is of the compact type, divided into an "upper" and "lower" mahala (neighbourhood) through which the village road crosses.

== History ==
Drevenik is not attested in the Ottoman 1467–1468 defter (tax registry) of the vilayet of Manastir, nor the 1568–1569 defter. According to Qemal Murati (2022), there were 19 out of 23 heads of households in the village that were of Albanian origin some time in the 15th–16th centuries, though no defter is referenced. The village was mentioned in 1803 as Drvenik (Дрвеник). At that time, the village was inhabited by Christians, known as Đurevci, who then settled Lisolaj. In c. 1805–1815, the village of Crnobuki was settled by Albanian harami (bandits) from Northern Albania, according to the descendants themselves, who were mountaineers and could no cope with life in the lowlands and resettled in Drevenik. The local Albanians were in Ottoman service and protected the Dreven pass (see also derbendci). Some families in the village held chiftlik in some nearby villages.

The village mosque was built in the second half of the 19th century.

The village was a site of the battle of Bitola in 1912 between the Serbian Army and the Ottoman Army.

== Demographics ==
The Albanian population in Drevenik belong to the Tosk linguistical subgroup. According to field studies conducted by J. Trifunoski (in 1951–57), the Albanian inhabitants claimed the first Albanians in the village were harami (bandits) that originated in Northern Albania from where they settled in the area in c. 1805–1815, and then encouraged other Albanians to settle. Their speech is the same as that of Demir-Hisar, but different from that of Presil. The Drevenik families mostly married with Muslims in Demir-Hisar, Obednik and Trnovci.

By the time of the liberation of the area by the Serbian Army in the First Balkan War, the immediate area had an exclusively Albanian population. Up until that time, the Drevenik Albanians mostly moved to Bitola, and since then, many migrated to Turkey; some 40 families had left the village by 1955.

In 1921 there were 67 households in the village, and in 1948 there were 79. In 1955, there were 58 houses in the village. In 1961 there were 19 households in the village and in 1971 there were 23. According to the 2002 census, the village had a total of 26 inhabitants, out of whom all were Albanians. The 2021 census counted three residents.

== Sources ==
- Stojanovski, Aleksandar (1971). Турски документи за историјата на македонскиот народ: Опширен пописен дефтер бр. 4 : (1467-1468 година). архив на Македонија.
- Stojanovski, Aleksandar (2008). Турски документи за историјата на македонскиот народ: Опширен пописен дефтер 1568-69 година. архив на Македонија.
- Trifunoski, Jovan F. (1998). Битољско-Прилепска котлина: антропогеографска проучавања (1914-1997). Српска академија наука и уметности.
