= Army of the classical Ottoman Empire =

Overview of the Ottoman army in the 15th–19th centuries

The Ottoman army was the military structure established by Mehmed II (r. 1451–1481) during his reorganization of the Ottoman state and its military. It resulted from a major reorganization of the standing army dating from the time of Sultan Orhan (r. 1323/4–1362), which had centred on janissaries who were paid by salary rather than rewarded with booty or fiefs. The army built by Orhan had operated during the period of the rise of the Ottoman Empire (1299 to 1453).

The organization introduced by Mehmed II was twofold, central (Ottoman Turkish: Kapıkulu, the household division) and peripheral (Ottoman Turkish: Eyalet, province-level). Sultan Mahmud II forced this army to disband on 15 June 1826 in what is known as Auspicious Incident, which followed a century-long reform effort.

== Predecessor force ==
The medieval Ottoman Empire had become the first country to maintain a standing army in Europe since the days of the Roman Empire. The force originated in the 14th century. The Ottoman army may have also been the first to equip with firearms, which they acquired during the reign of Murad II (r. 1421–1451).

== Units ==
=== Infantry ===
==== Janissaries ====
The Janissaries were elite infantry units created by Sultan Murad I. They formed the Ottoman Sultan's household troops and bodyguards and became a famed force in 1383. They were units that formed the infantry contingents of the Ottoman Sultan's household troops, recruited through the process of devshirme. For all practical purposes, Janissaries belonged to the Sultan, carrying the title kapıkulu (Subject of the gate) indicating their collective bond with the Sultan. Janissaries were taught to consider the corps as their home and family, and the Sultan as their de facto father. The janissary corps was significant in a number of ways. The janissaries wore uniforms, were paid in cash as regular soldiers, and marched to distinctive music, by the mehter. The Janissaries were a formidable military unit in the early centuries, but as Western Europe modernized its military organization and technology, the Janissaries became a reactionary force that resisted all change. Steadily the Ottoman military power became outdated, but when the Janissaries felt their privileges were being threatened, or outsiders wanted to modernize them, or they might be superseded by their cavalry rivals, they rose in rebellion.

==== Yaya ====
The history of Yaya goes to the early Ottoman military forces consisted of irregular nomadic cavalry and volunteer light infantry. These units were efficient against local Byzantine feudal lords but were unable to capture fortified castles by direct assault. Established by Sultan Orhan during Alaeddin Pasha's reorganization the military in the mid 1320s.

Yaya and Musellem over time lost their original martial qualities.

Infantry

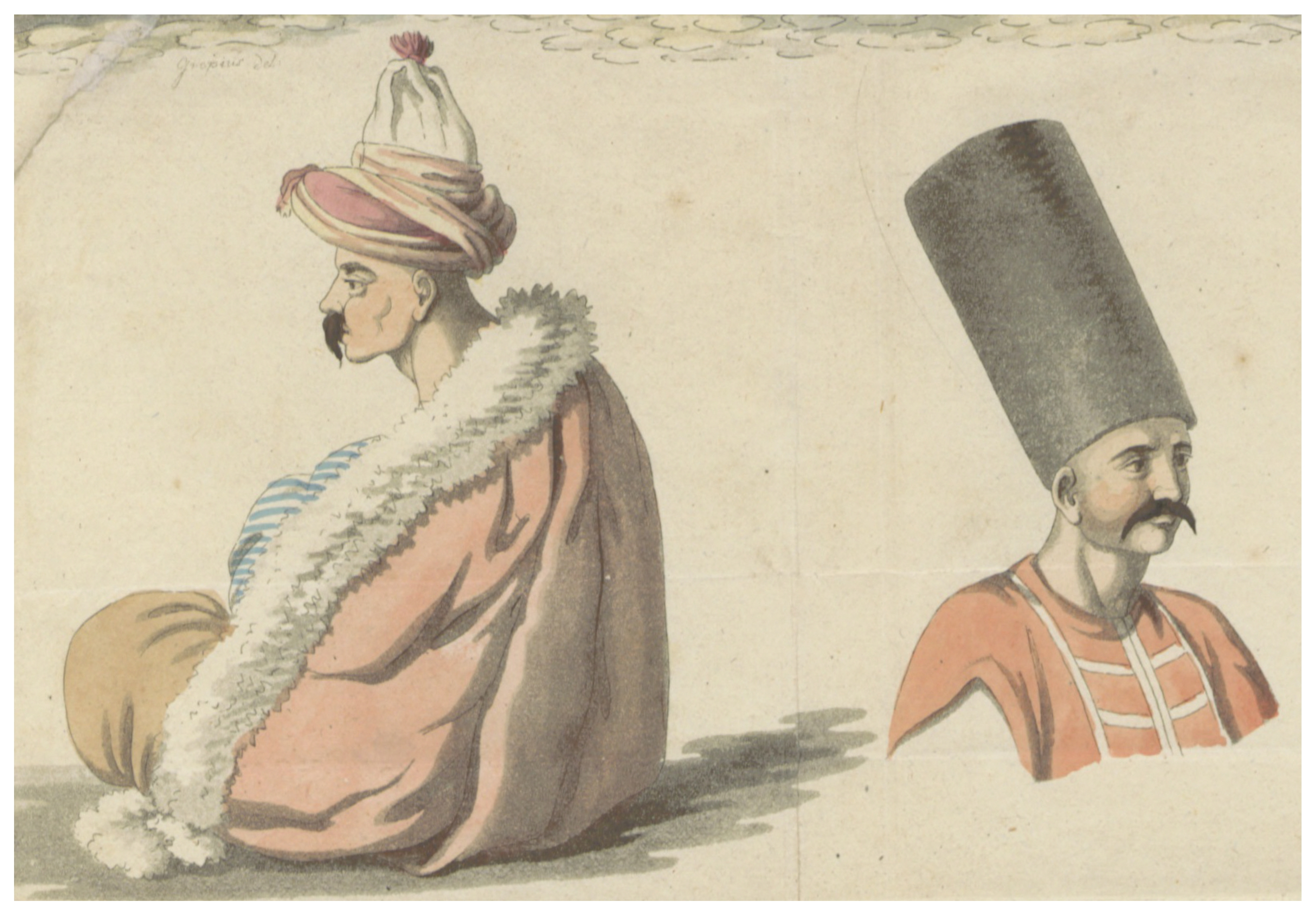
Janissary (1805)

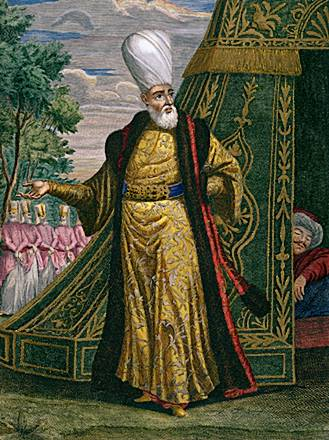
Agha of the Janissaries (18th century)

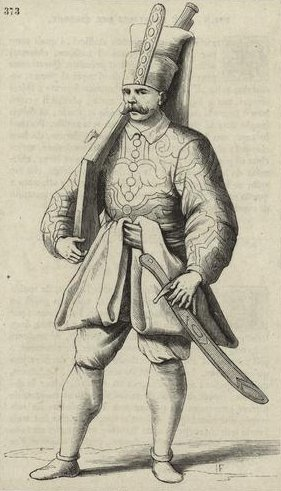
Janissary (16th century)

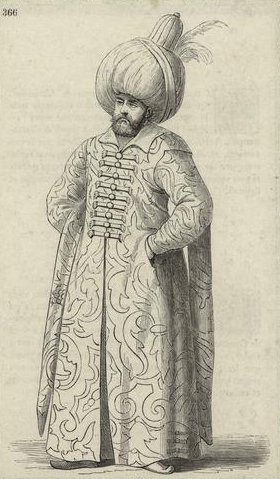
Agha of the Janissaries (16th century)

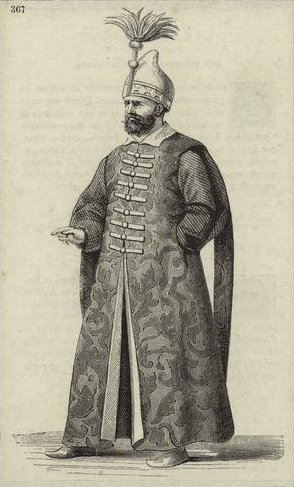
Janissary officer with the rank of pasha (16th century)

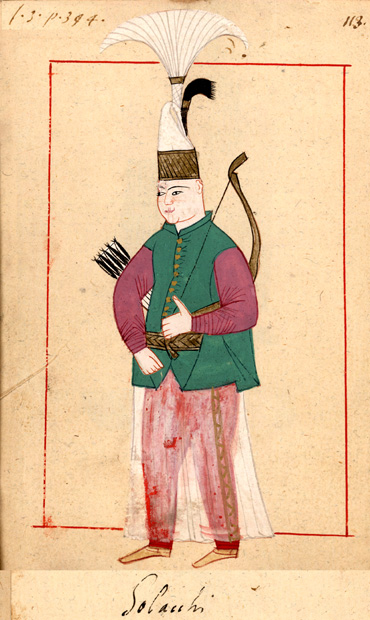
Solaks, personal guard of the Sultan

=== Cavalry ===
The Six Divisions of Cavalry, also known as the Kapıkulu Süvarileri ("Household Cavalry of Gate Slaves"), was a corps of elite cavalry soldiers in the army of the Ottoman Empire. There were not really six, but four, divisions in the corps. Two of the six were sub-divisions.

==== Silahdars ====
The Silahdars (From Persian, translated roughly as "men at arms") were a bodyguard division for the Sultan, under the command of the Silahdar Agha.

Silahdars were chosen from the best warriors. Any Ottoman soldier who committed a significant deed on the battlefield could be promoted to the Silahdar division, although normally members of other mounted units, like Timarli Sipahis or one of the other less prestigious of the four divisions of Kapikulu Sipahis, were promoted this way. Infantry soldiers had to enlist as serdengecti (literally means giver of his head) and survive suicide missions to join the Silahdar division. If a janissary ever became a silahdar, other members of the division with cavalry backgrounds despised him and former comrade janissaries considered him a traitor, but because the position and wealth of a silahdar was so attractive, janissaries and other soldiers still enlisted for suicide missions.

==== Sipahi ====
(Persian: "soldier") Sipahi refers to all freeborn heavy cavalry other than akıncıs and tribal horsemen in the Ottoman army. The word was used almost synonymously with cavalry.

==== Akıncı ====
Akıncı were irregular light cavalry, scout divisions and advance troops. They were one of the first divisions to face the opposing military and were known for their prowess in battle. Unpaid they lived and operated as raiders on the frontiers of the Ottoman Empire, subsisting totally on plunder.

The Akıncıs continued to serve until 1595 when after a major rout in Wallachia they were dissolved by Grand Vezir Koca Sinan Paşa.

Cavalry

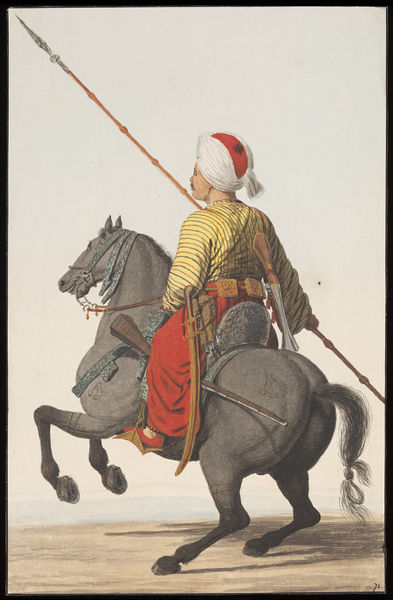
Sipahi

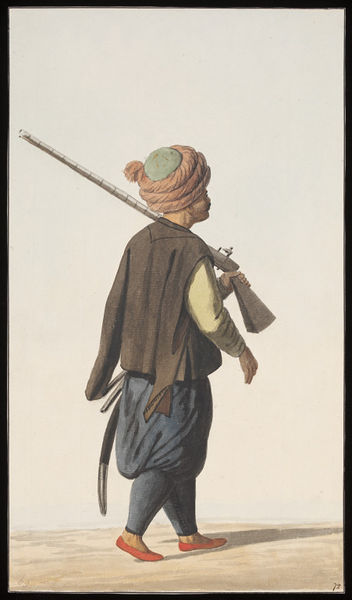
Silahdar

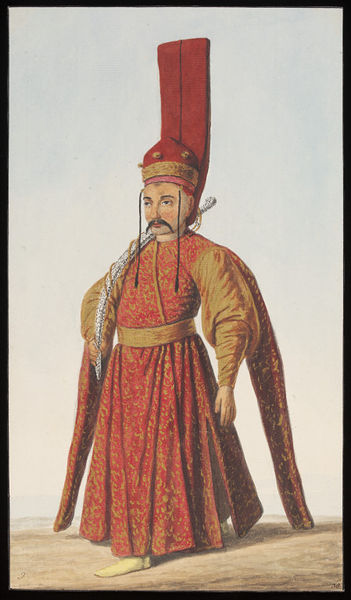
Silahdar Agha

=== Artillery ===
In this section, the artillery corps (Topçu Ocağı: literally the hearth of artillerymen), the armorer corps (Cebeci Ocağı: literally the hearth of armourers), the artillery wagoners (Top Arabacıları Ocağı: literally the hearth of artillery wagoners), the bombardiers (Humbaracı Ocağı: literally the hearth of bombardiers), the miners (Lağımcı Ocağı: literally the hearth of miners).

==== Topçu ====
The Topçu Ocağı (artillery corps) was responsible for the use of artillery pieces. It is not clear when artillery was first used by the Ottoman Army. Although some argue that the Ottomans used cannons in the Battles of Kosovo (1389) and Nicopolis (1396), it is certain that artillery was routinely used by the 1420s. However the other argument states that field guns entered service shortly after the Battle of Varna (1444) and more certainly used in the Second Battle of Kosovo (1448). Specialist 'topçu' or artillery units were formed mainly of Christians; units such as tayfa-i efreciye. In the siege of Baghdad where the Ottomans retook the city from the Persians (1638), gunners of European descent served on the lines.

==== Cebeci ====
Exact foundation date of the Cebeci is not known, but it was in the 15th century. Their commander was called Cebecibaşı. The unit was small and selected, numbering no more than 625 men in 1574. The Cebeci unit was in charge of maintenance and keeping the weaponry. They were also responsible in transporting weapons to where they were needed. During peace times, they kept the weaponry in arsenals (cephane).

==== Humbaracı ====
The Humbaracı Ocağı (Bombardiers) were in charge of manufacturing, transporting, and using cannons (humbara). Humbaraci Corps arose in the 16th century after an artillery commander Mustafa had cast the first bronze cannon. In the 18th century they became the most disciplined unit of the Ottoman Army. In 1826 during the Auspicious Incident Humbaracis supported the government.

Artillery

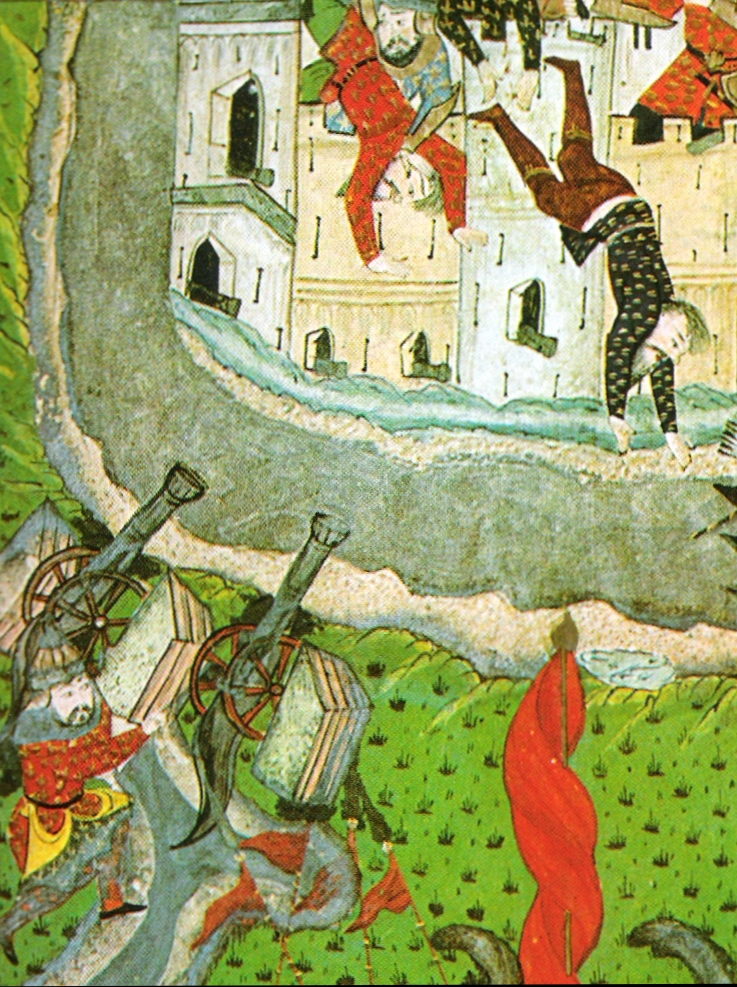
Topçu, 1551

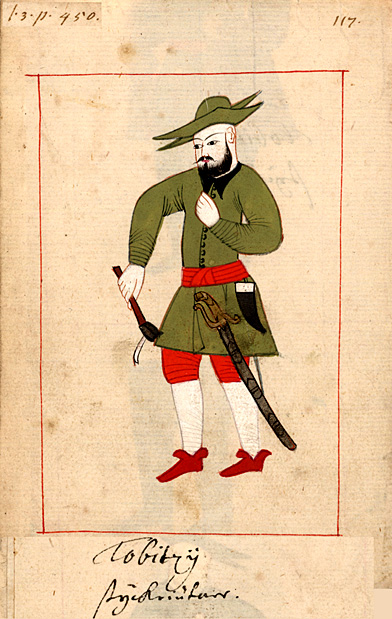
Topçu

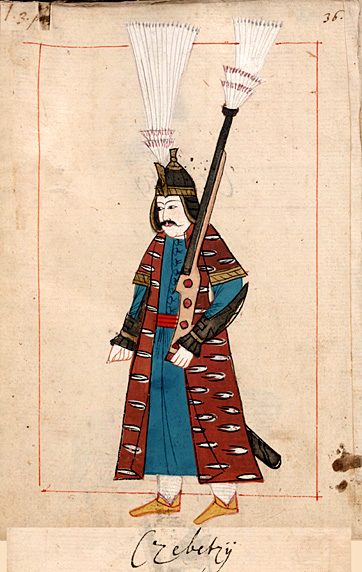
Cebeci

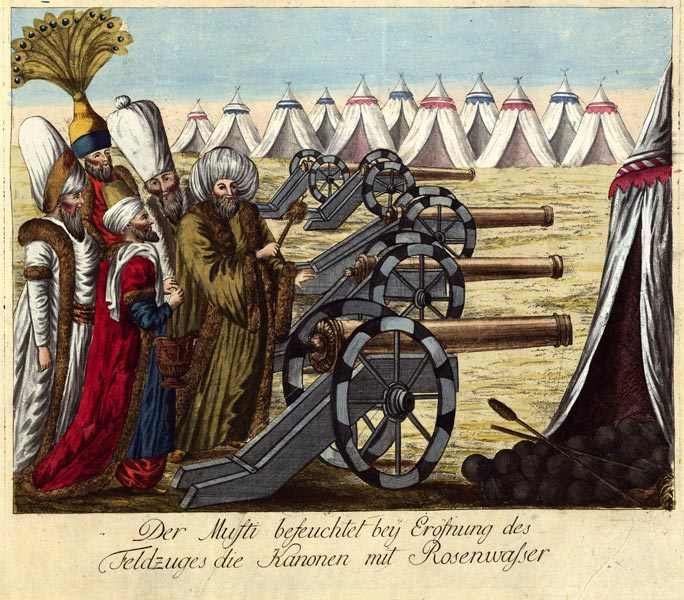
All Artillery branches

=== Support units ===
The Ottoman armies were distinguished from their contemporaries in the West not by numerical predominance of its military forces but by the thoroughness of the administrative backup and general support that maintained them in the field. The auxiliary support system also set the Classical Army apart from their contemporaries. The janissaries waged war as one part of a well-organized military machine. The Ottoman army had a corps to prepare the road, a corps to pitch the tents ahead, a corps to bake the bread. The cebeci corps carried and distributed weapons and ammunition. The janissary corps had its own internal medical auxiliaries: Muslim and Jewish surgeons who would travel with the corps during campaigns and had organized methods of moving the wounded and the sick to traveling hospitals behind the lines.

==== Military band ====
Ottoman military bands are thought to be the oldest variety of military marching band in the world. Though they are often known by the Persian-derived word mehter in the West, that word, properly speaking, refers only to a single musician in the band.

=== Paramilitary units ===
Ottomans had forces organized as a group supplementing but not directly incorporated in a regular military.

==== Derbendjis ====
Dervendjis were the most important and largest Ottoman military auxiliary constabulary units usually responsible for guarding important roads, bridges, fords or mountain passes. Usually, the population of an entire village near some important pass would be assigned with derbendci status in exchange for tax exemptions. By rehabilitating the Derbendcis, the Ottomans released conventional military units from routine internal duties, such as guarding and repairing roads, bridges.

Non-combatant

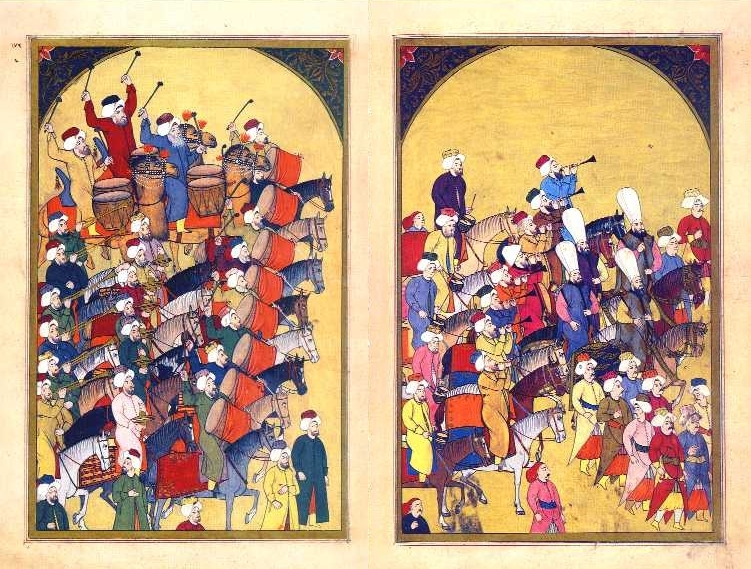
Military band, Mehter

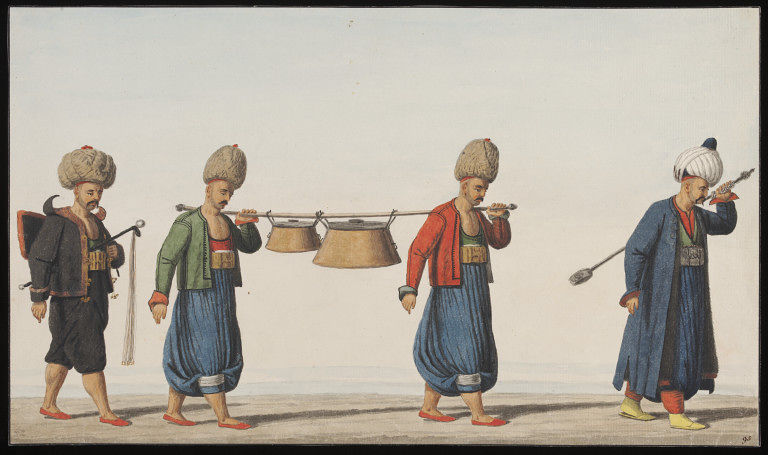
Kitchen, carrying kazan.

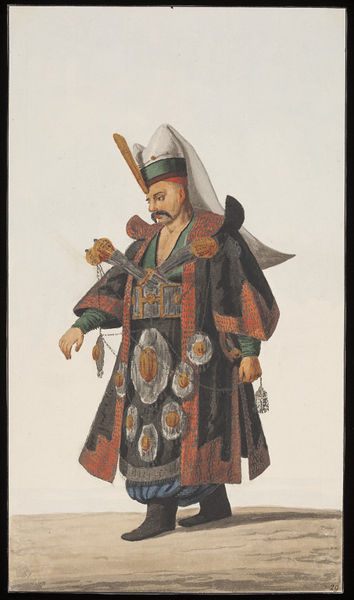
Kitchen, Head Chef

== Organization ==
The units were organized in twofold system. The Sultan's units that is called Kapi Kulu and provincial units.

=== Kapi Kulu (Sultan's) ===
The title "kapikulu" (Subject of the gate) indicating their collective bond with the Sultan.

Kapikulu was commanded and paid by some important land-holders who gained power and became a sort of noble class. The mercenaries became a tool for their rise to predominance over the sultan, who simply could not afford to hire so many mercenaries that they would outnumber his nobles'. Therefore, in the middle of the 14th century, Murad I built his own personal slave army called the kapikulu. The new force was based on the sultan's right to a fifth of the war booty, which he interpreted to include captives taken in battle. The captive slaves were converted to Islam and trained in the sultan's personal service.

Kapi Kulu Units are : Infantry (Janissary, Yaya) Cavalry (Silahtar, Sipahi) Artillery (Topçu, Cebeci, Humbaracı) Non-Combatant (Military band)

==== Kazasker ====
A kazasker was a chief judge over the cases involving soldiers. Two kazaskers were appointed. They were named based on the region of their jurisdiction. They were called Rumeli Kazaskeri and Anadolu Kazaskeri. They were subordinated to the Şeyhülislam. The capital Istanbul did not have any kazasker. Kazaskers attended the meetings at the Imperial Council.

Kapi Kulu

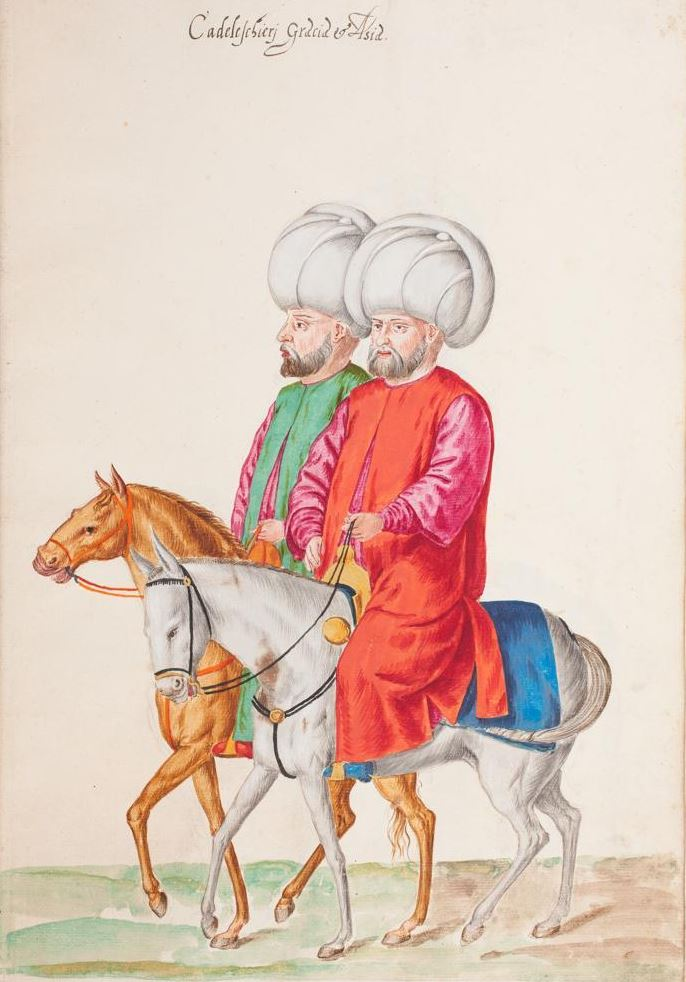
Kazasker

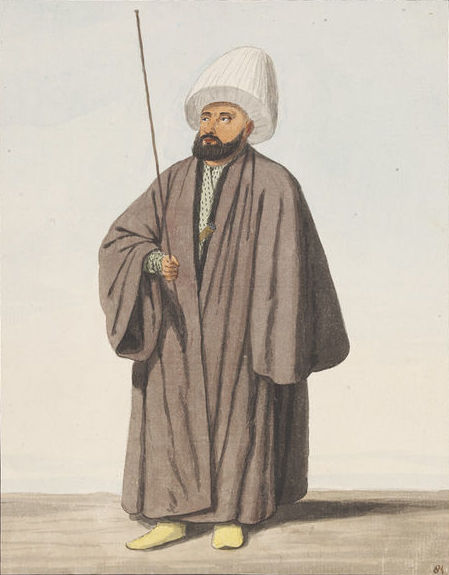
Palace security.

=== Provincial (Eyalet) ===
Through the timariot system (see conscription) Empire had "timariot Sipahi" throughout the Empire.

Provincial units are: Timariot Sipahi, Akıncı, Derbendcis

== Symbols ==
=== Flags ===
Military flags occupied an important position. Ottoman flags separated by divisions (such as types of fields—tripes, quarters, etc.), colors and charges (emblems, inscriptions, lettering), and the colors of charges and their propositions. There were many Ottoman flags, each with specific meaning. Contrary to Latin script, Ottoman flags (in Arabic script inscriptions are always read from right to left), are described from the opposite point of view—that is, with the flag fluttering to the left. Ottoman flags come in various shapes and are of different proportions, however they are predominantly rectangular and in some triangular. The Ottoman form of the fly is substantial, and it is descate. The Ottoman (most are) rectangular flags have a triangular fly, and usually have a border.

Flags exhibited a determined state ideology to Ottomans. Ottoman military flags were to the highest standards. Some of the best traits of Asian flags were used by the Ottoman military in combination and often with elaboration. Arab flags influenced the Turks in a fundamental way, but pre-Muslim Turkish tradition was also important, as were influences from Mesopotamia, Anatolia, and Persia. The flags in general is a product of Asia, so is Ottoman flags, but in this period European influences cannot be ignored when looking at Ottoman military flag design.

As the flags were/are part of signaling system, it is important to analyze every part. The nomadic Mongols, close neighbors of the Turkish tribes, had from antiquity used totemic standards that were a kind of metal, wood, and animal hair, which Ottoman military continued on their flag pools (tug). The Mongols applied these materials to the typical cloth flag (cloth flag is Chinese origin), their emblems and symbols. The nomadic signs, with horse—and yaktail standards, were adopted by the Chinese, and, vice versa, which makes hard to state the source some of these signs used in Ottoman flags. These signs carried over with the subsequent migrations of the Mongols and the Turks. (Note: It is true that some flags/signs had already been carried to Europe by Iranian and Aral tribes) For the same period, very little is known about old Iranian flags (signs). Traces of ancient Mesopotamian culture, charged with typical motifs of mythical, astral, and magic origin could be in them. There are Persian flags in miniature paintings. These flags are usually small, come in various shapes and colors, and bear Koranic inscriptions. A French traveler Jean Chardin left some descriptions of the Safavid flags and according to him they differed from Ottoman flags of the same period. Arab flags were of basic importance to followers Islam, including Ottoman Military. The first caliphs tried to maintain an original simplicity in their signs, appropriate to an ascetic and fighting religion, but soon, under Persian influence, the style evolved into one using more representative and pompous images. Like in Arabic flags, sophisticated abstract decoration, and lines of Koranic inscriptions were found on Ottoman military flags.

In the Ottoman military the loss of military signs (flags, etc.) in battle was considered a disaster. Some of the signs (flags) were deliberately thrown off into the enemy's direction which signaled for attack and/or recapture.

==== The hierarchy ====
Military flags were not all equal. There was an order of importance. Every larger detachment of the army was honored with a flag (sancak). Smaller units had banners called bayrak, with various emblems used mainly as recognition signals. In battle they were carried in the front lines. During rest trusted into the ground placed front of the tent or on top.

===== Sancak-I Serif =====
The Sacred Standard of Muhammad (Sancak-ı Şerif, literally translates as the Noble Banner) is said to be the banner of Muhammad himself or at least to originate from his era. The banner was first used in a battle against the Austrian Habsburgs in 1593 and again for a war in Hungary in 1594. After Mehmed III took the banner and won the Siege of Eger in 1596, the banner became a victory symbol for the Ottoman forces. Yet, misunderstanding and confusion surround it, as in the belief, for instance, that it was captured by Christians at the Battle of Vienna on September 12, 1683. (Note: King Sobieski, the owner of the greatest share of the trophies, was sure that the sacred banner was among the fallen Sanjaks. In a letter of September 13, 1683, written in the occupied tents of the grand vizier, Sobieski informed the queen that the "Muhammadan standard given by the Sultan to the grand vizier" would immediately be sent to Rome to Pope Innocent XI. This standard is not in Rome now. The Turks had saved their holy relic, which was returned to Belgrade and then to Istanbul.)

The deceleration of war included the Sancak-i Serif. Sancak-i Serif is used as a gathering point for the military units. The banner was occasionally carried into battles to encourage troops and ensure victory. The banner would be taken out of its box by the Sultan and affixed to a staff. He would carry it from the Chamber of the Holy Relics to the Throne Room while officials called out "God is great". After this, the banner was carried from the Throne Room to the Gate of Felicity and placed there. The grand vizier would receive the banner from the sultan in a ceremony in the Throne Room. While the grand vizier and the şeyhülislâm stood in attendance, the sultan would kiss the Holy Banner and entrust it to his grand vizier with the words: "I entrust the Sacred Standard to you and you to God. May He be your helper (a better translation: "May He become your Defender and Supporter")!"

===== Sultan's Flag =====
Sultan's Flag is second in the hierarchy. Sultan flags were private to Sultan and were ranked according to their owners' names, titles, and authority. Their Turkish names were Alem-i padisahi (Padisah's standard), alem-i Osmani (Ottoman standard), or liwãj-i Sultani (sultan's standard). Seven such flags attributed to the Sultan, which this number corresponded to the number of iklims (climates or spheres of the earth) that were to be subdued by the victorious armies of Islam.

===== Sanjaks of Pashas =====
These are flags of the high-ranking officials and dignitaries. Viziers, beylerbeys, and sancakbeys. They were partially imitation of the flag of the Sultan, as a sign to be part of the Sultan's people. Grand Vizers used green, lower Viziers crimson, and Beylerbeys used red in their flag."

===== Tactical Flags =====
These were in many, but not lasted to our time. There are multiple of them, up to 162 count of signals. We know that right wing of the army marked with red banners and left wing with yellow. We also know that they are tactical importance to hide the exact number of soldiers.

Cavalry, infantry, and artillery had their own flags.

Hierarchy of Flags from the Costume Book by Lambert de Vos, 1574

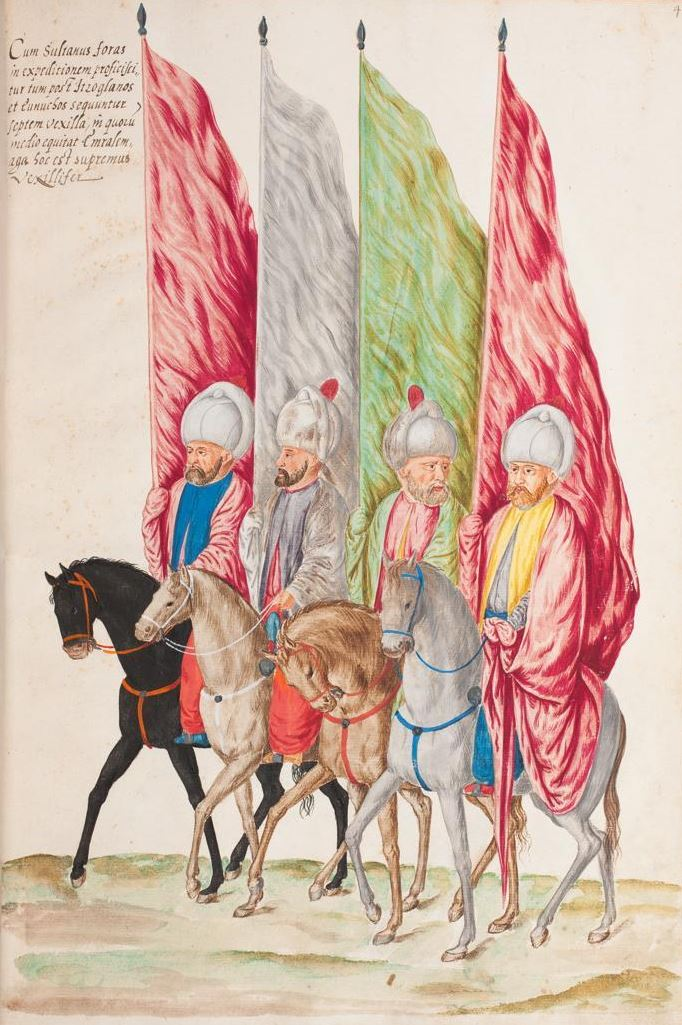
Sultan's Flags

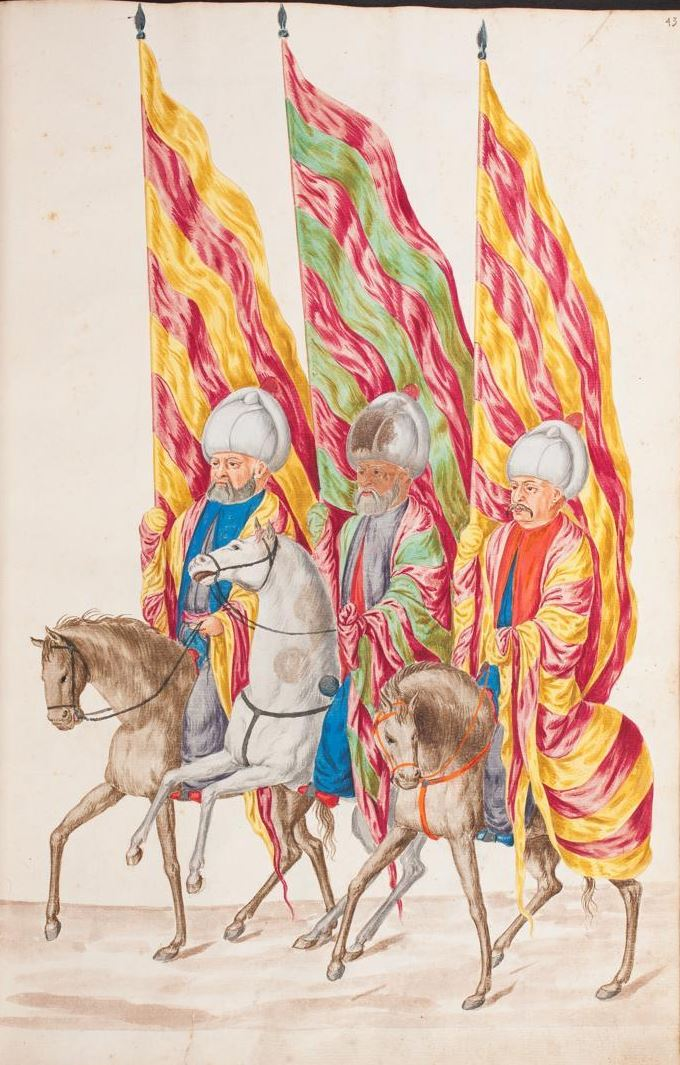
Sanjaks of Pashas

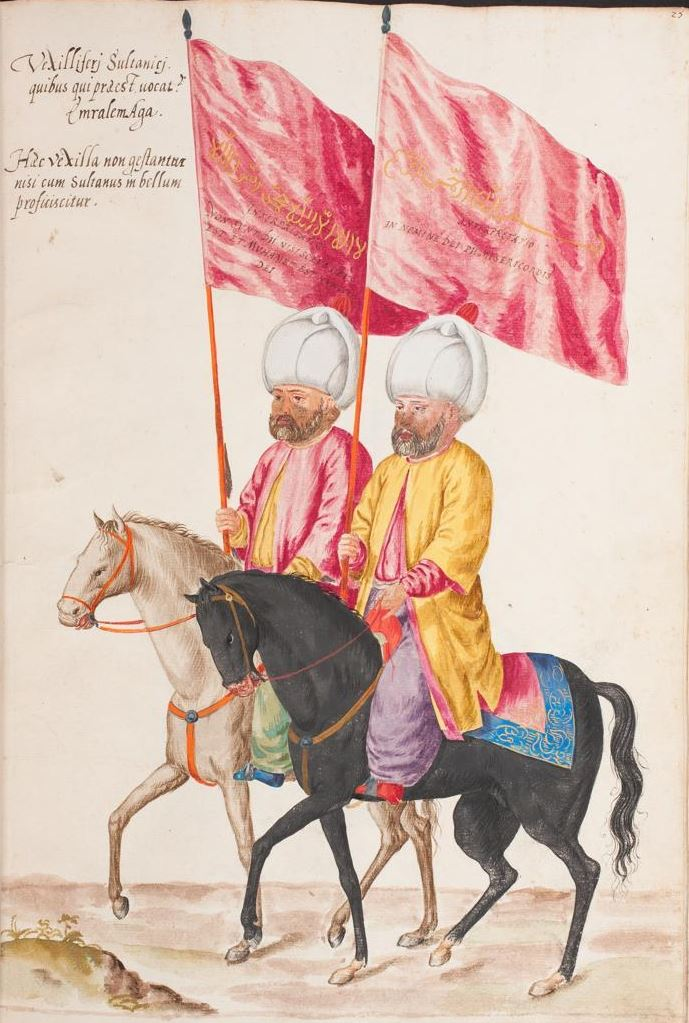
Right wing units (costume, tugh define the province)

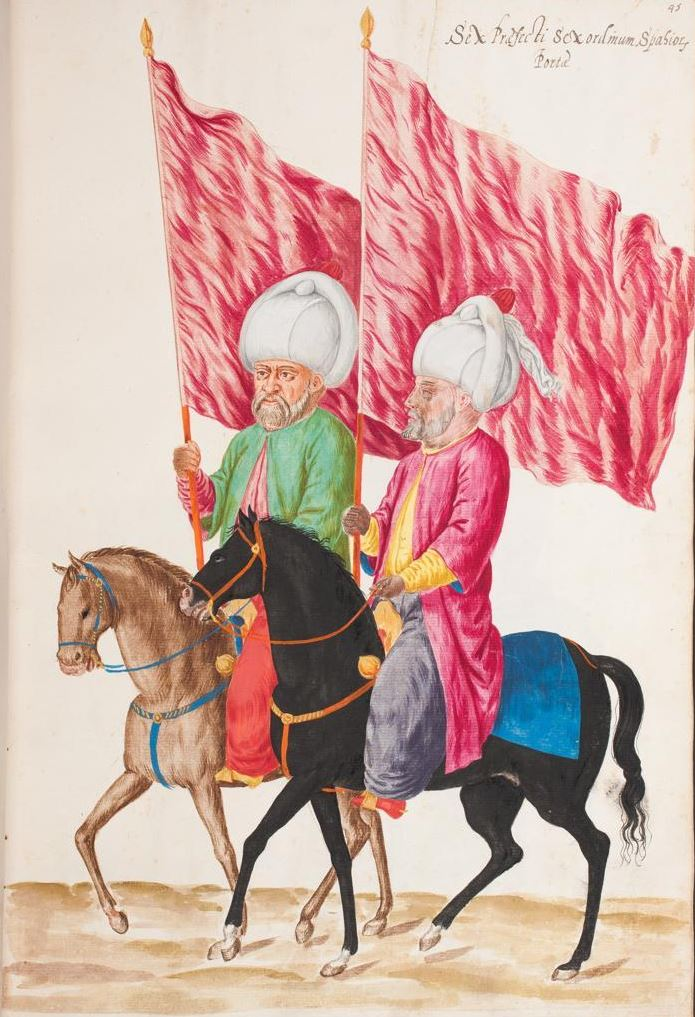
Right wing units (costume, tugh define the province)

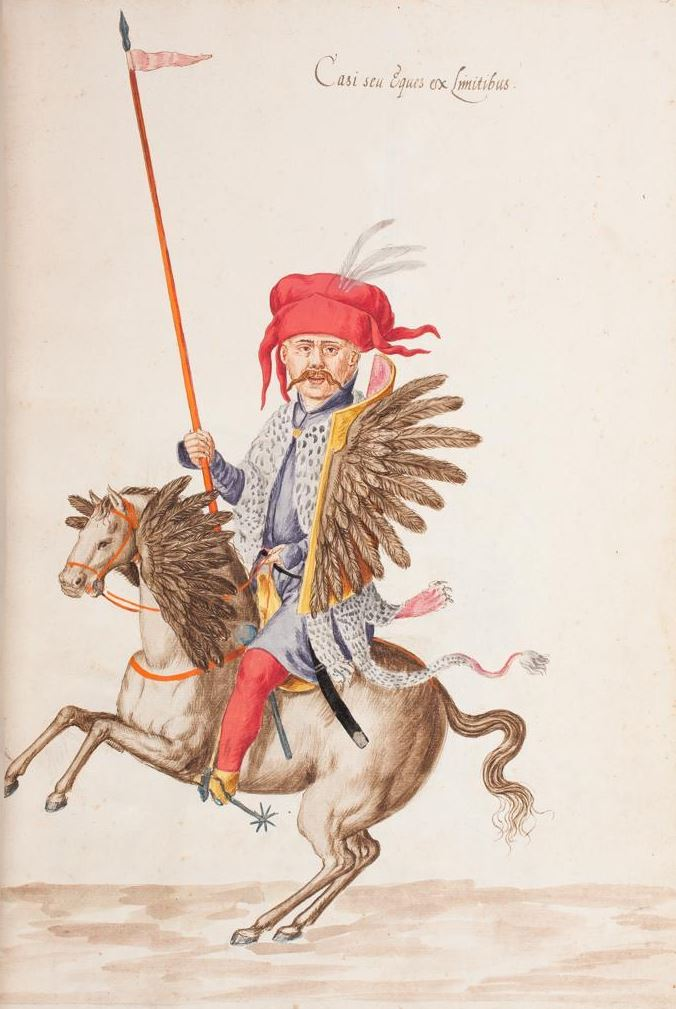
Tactical Flag (banner)

This were symbol of military junta of Ottoman Empire to kill Mehmed VI.

=== Tugh ===
The Ottoman armies used the horse-tail standard or tugh rather than flags.

== Personnel ==
=== Recruitment ===
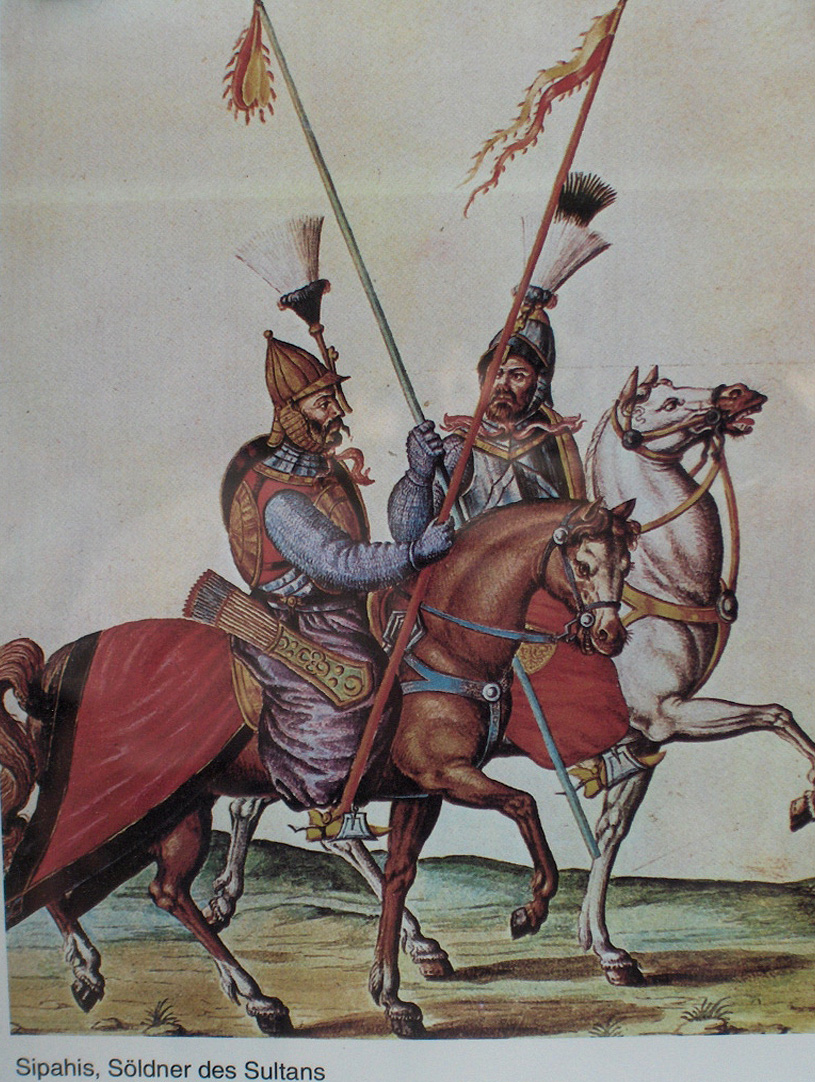
Sipahis at the Battle of Vienna in 1683

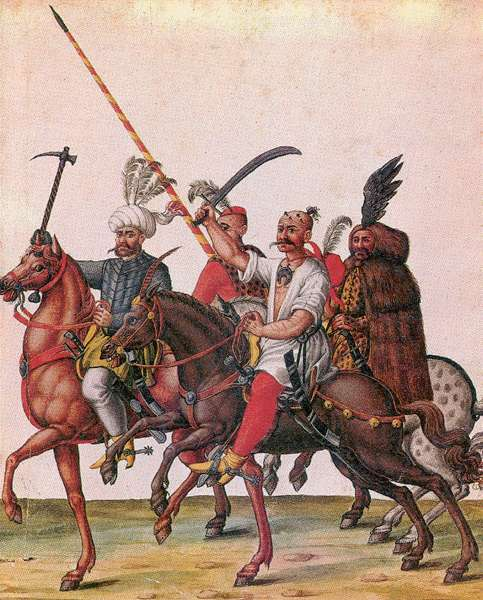
Akinjis in Central Hungary, 16th century

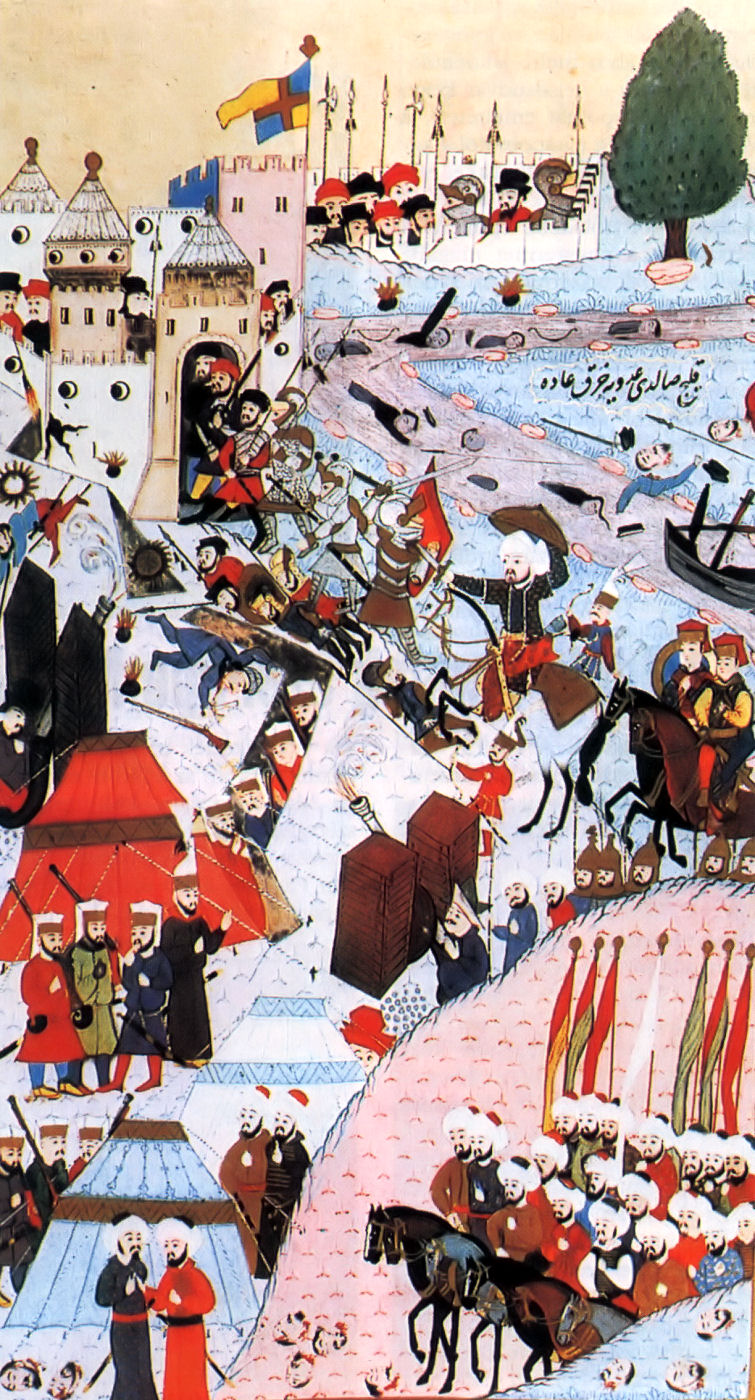
Siege of Belgrade, 1456, Ottoman miniature.

==== Devshirme ====
In order to man the force, Murad II developed the devşirme system of kidnapping youths as a form of "taxes" from Christians in the empire. Murad used the strength of the kapikulus and played them off against the nobility, forcing them to pay taxes or land so that the treasury could obtain the money it needed to maintain the Kapikulu army. The janissaries comprised infantry units that formed the Ottoman sultan's household troops and bodyguard. The first janissary units comprised war captives and slaves. After the 1380s Sultan Mehmed I filled their ranks with the results of taxation in human form called devshirme: the Sultan's men conscripted a number of non-Muslim, usually Christian, boys—at first at random, later, by strict selection—to be trained. Initially they favored Greeks, Albanians (who also supplied many gendarmes), usually selecting about one in five boys of ages seven to fourteen but the numbers could be changed to correspond with the need for soldiers. Next the devshirme was extended to also include Serbs, Bosnians and other Balkan countries, later especially Ukraine and southern Russia.

The Janissaries started accepting enrollment from outside the devshirme system first during the reign of Sultan Murad III and completely stopped enrolling devshirme in the 17th century. After this period, volunteers were enrolled.

==== Timar ====
A timariot or 'Timarli Sipahi' served the Empire and in return was granted a fief called a timar. The timariots had to assemble with the army when at war, and had to take care of the land entrusted to him in times of peace. When at war, the timariot had to bring his own equipment and in addition a number of armed retainers (cebelu).

==== Azap ====
Apart from the janissaries, in 1389 the Ottoman army introduced a system of conscription: when needed, every town and village were obliged to provide a fully equipped conscript at the recruiting office created by the order of the Sultan. This new force of irregular infantrymen was called the azabs and they were used in many ways: to build roads and bridges for the army, to support the supplies for the front-line, and sometimes they were even used as cannon fodder to slow down enemy advance. The Başıbozuk, who were also called Delibaş ("crazy head"), were a branch of the azabs and were especially recruited among the homeless and criminals. They were fierce, undisciplined, and specialized in close combat.

During the last quarter of the 16th century, the Azabs disappeared from the Ottoman documentary record.

==== Sekban ====
The Ottomans increased the use of Sekban (temporary infantry recruits) soldiers in the 17th century. They had a wartime strength of between 4,000 and 10,000 men.

=== Ranks ===
There were two levels of grouping, these were regiment and

- Çorbacı was a commander of an "orta" (Regiment), approximately corresponding to the rank of colonel.
- Boluk-bashi was a commander of a "bölük" (Company), equivalent with the rank of captain.

As a term Aghas were used for all level of commanders and all branches. It corresponds to a modern definition of an officer, which is a member of an armed force or uniformed service who holds a position of authority. This is like "azap agha" for the commanders of azaps, "besli agha" for the commanders of besli, "janissary agha" for the commanders of janissary. This is also true for instance the "bölük agha", and the "ocak agha", the commanders of a "bölük" and an "ocak" (troops) respectively.

Explicit	Exact	Western Equivalent
	Sultan	Commander-in-Chief
Grand Vizier		Marshal
Pasha		(Brigadier – General)
Agha	Çorbacı	Colonel
Agha	Boluk-bashi	Captain
	Nefer	Private

=== Training ===
Acemi (rookie) boys would be gathered to be trained at the Enderun acemi oğlan school in the capital city. At the school, young cadets would be selected for their talents in different areas to train as engineers, artisans, riflemen, clerics, archers, artillery, etc.

=== Redif ===
Reserve units known as the redif formed in the early-19th century.

== Military production ==
=== Tophane-i Amire ===
Sultan Mehmed II erected many cannon-foundries in Istanbul, the most famous of which is the Tophane foundry which produced bronze cannons for siege warfare. It made large bombards which had a diameter of 60 to 100 cm and in 1562 alone it cast a total of 1012 guns weighing all together 481 tonnes.

The ammunition used by the bronze bombards were stone balls, 1 meter in diameter and weighed 400 kg. The transportation of just two bombards proved to be a logistically challenging task. They were dragged to the Fall of Constantinople by 70 oxen and 1000 men. The casting of these bombards are described by Kritoboulos 1467. He describes the clay mould and the core which was strengthened by iron, wood, earth and stone. 45 tonnes of copper and tin are said to be placed in two furnaces constructed out of large stone blocks, laid with cement and covered by fire bricks and smeared in clay. Logs of wood along with charcoal are placed inside the furnace and all the holes except the tapping channels are closed. Then bellows are put to work until the metal inside is in a fluid state. The liquid bronze is then poured into the clay mould where it is then chiseled and polished.

=== Tersâne-i Âmire ===
Tersâne-i Âmire was the Imperial shipyard, on the Golden Horn. The shipyard was founded on the Golden Horn in 1453, after the Ottoman conquest of Constantinople, and initially called the Galata Shipyard. In the 16th century it became known as the Tersâne-i Âmire and was greatly expanded, with 140 docks and a perimeter wall to keep prying eyes away from naval secrets; it took over from the main shipyard at Gallipoli. From this time on, the Tersâne-i Âmire was at the heart of shipbuilding and naval governance in the Ottoman Empire. However, the shipyard suffered ups and downs with the rest of the empire. There were reforms and expansions after the Battle of Lepanto in 1571; in 1601 the shipyard had 3524 employees but this steadily fell to 726 in 1700; during this period an increasing amount of work was done by other shipyards. By the reign of Abdulmejid I (r. 1839–1861), the Tersane-i Amire had fallen into neglect and underinvestment; Abdülmecid started a massive investment programme which modernised not just the Tersane-i Amire but also shipyards in Izmit and Gemlik.

Military production

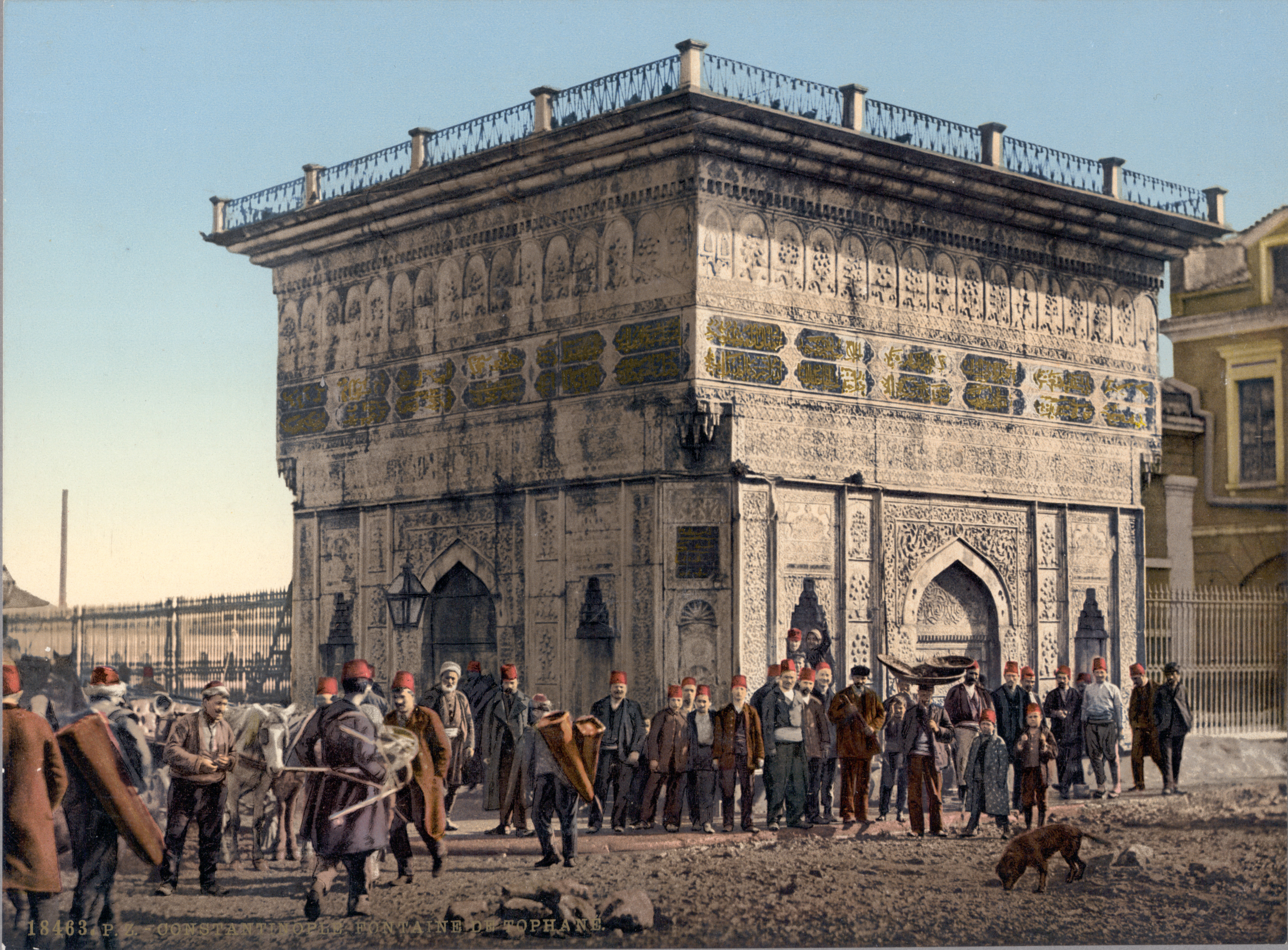
Tophane, 1890s.

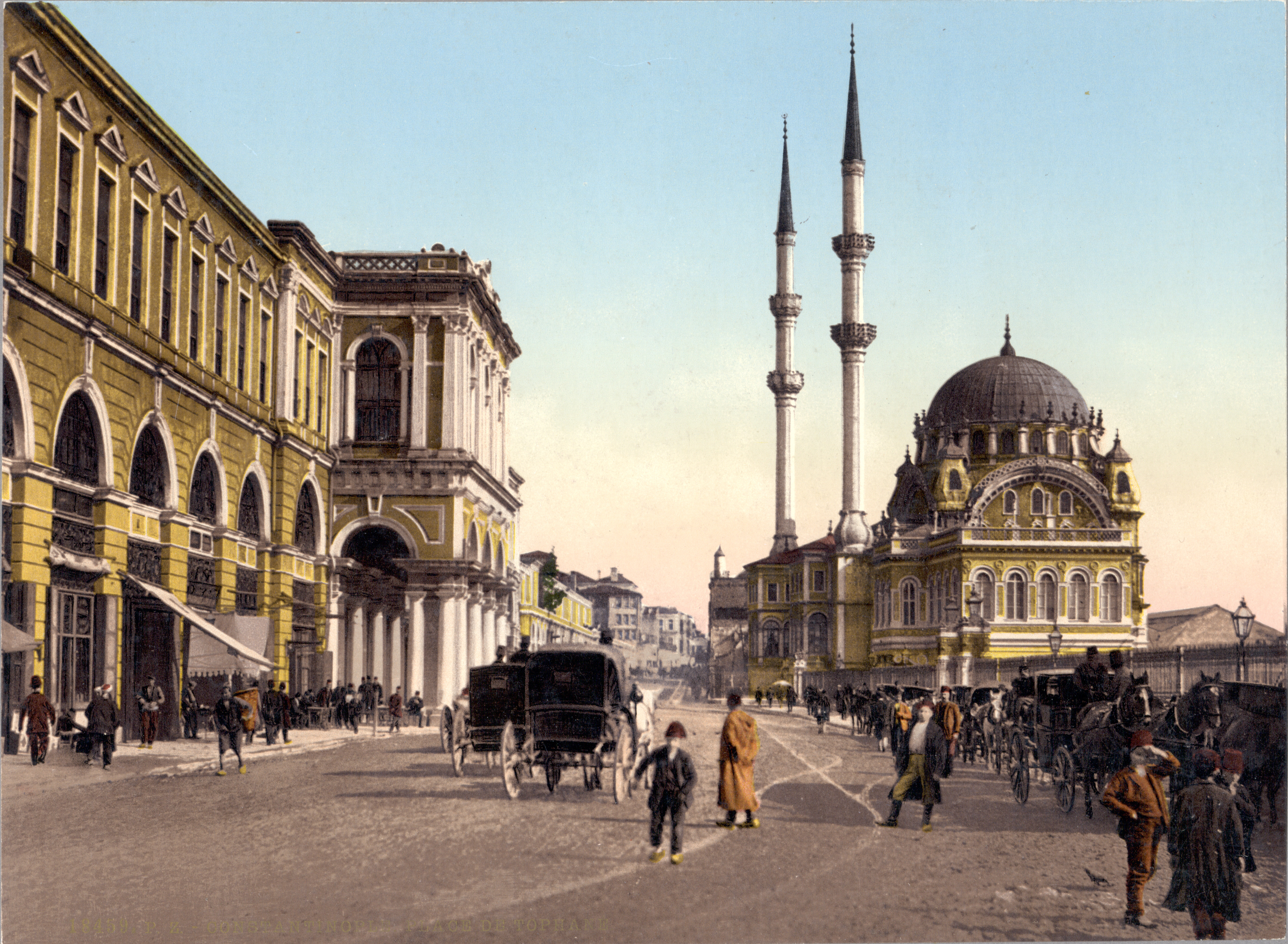
Tophane, 1890s.

== Equipment ==
=== Weapons ===
The weapons of the army.

Weapons

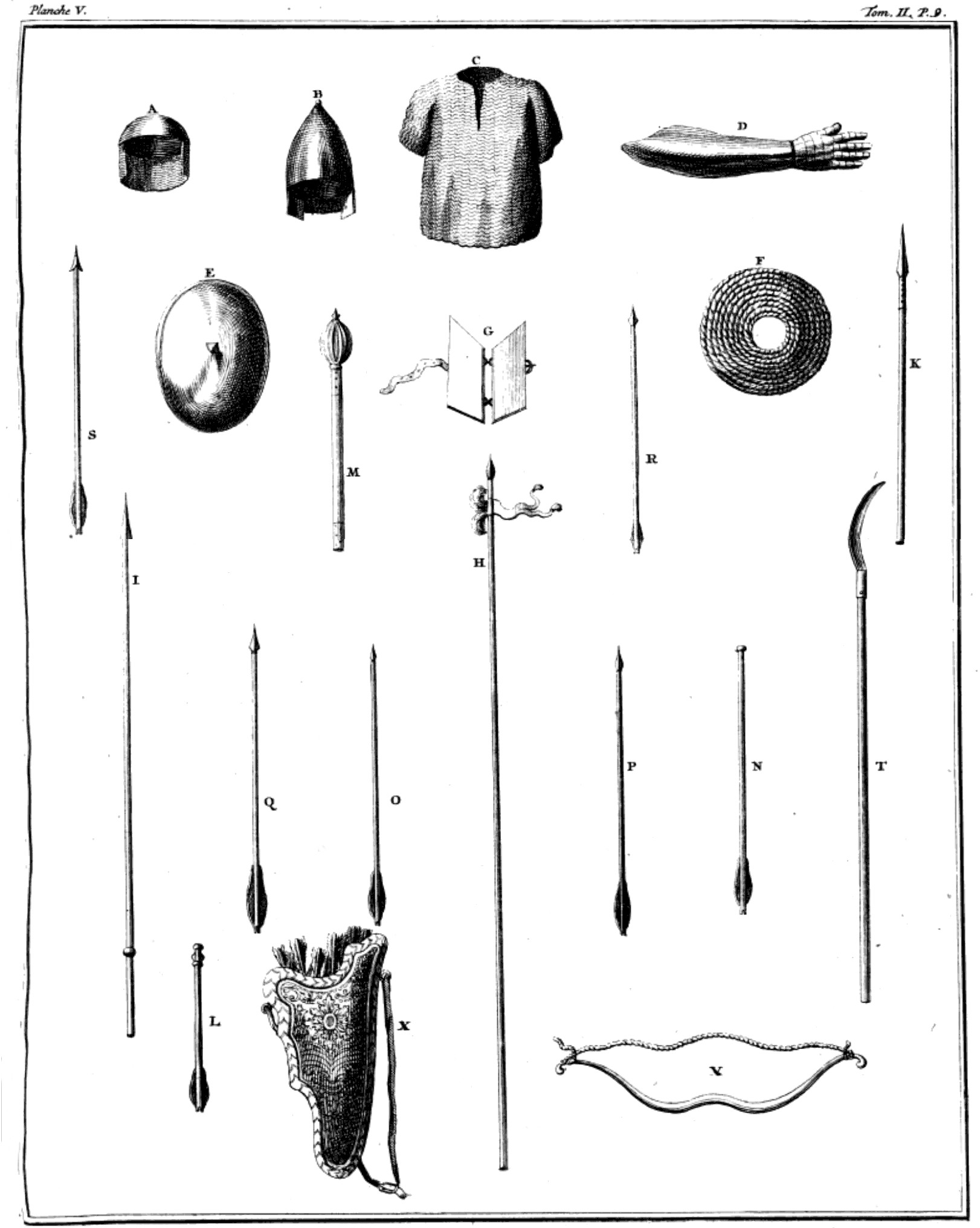
Arms

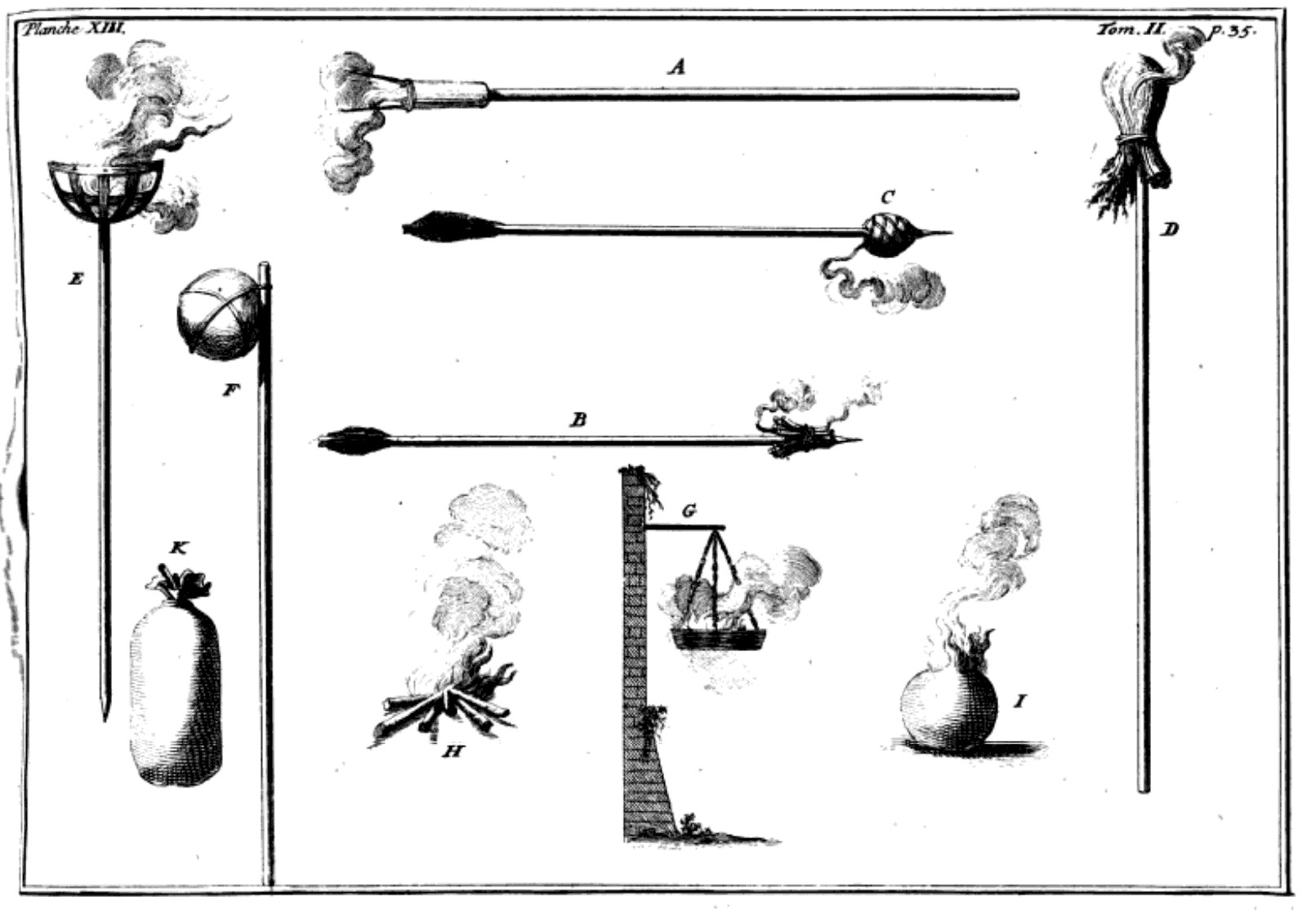
Arms

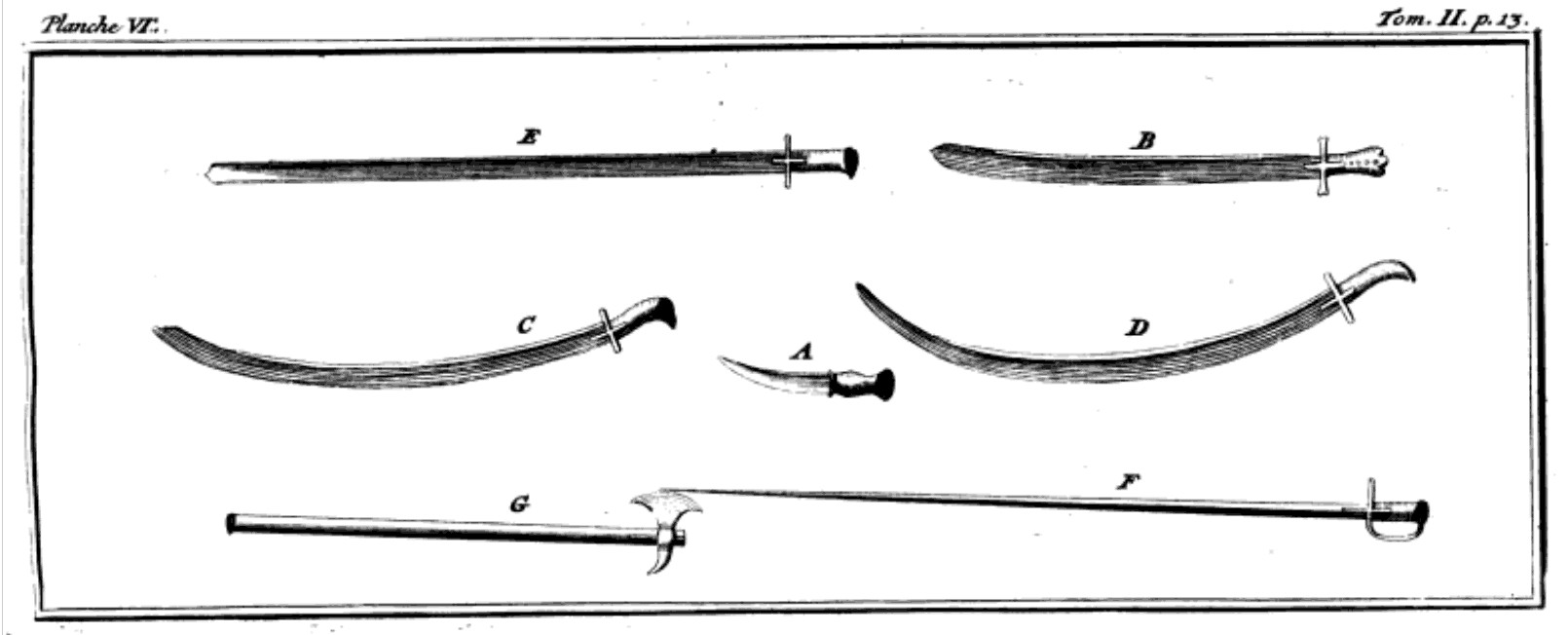
Arms

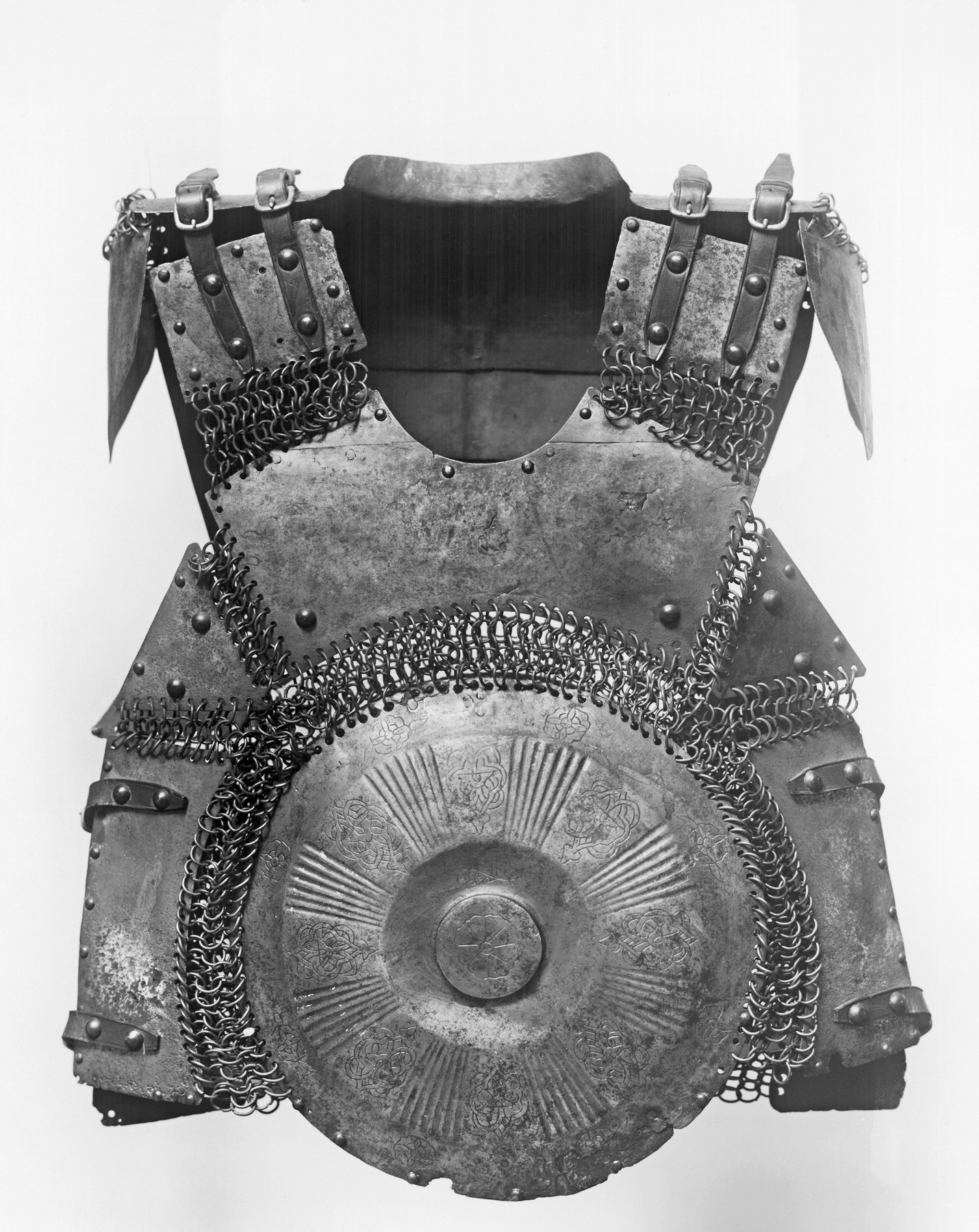
Body Armor

=== Artillery ===
One of the greatest advancements in Ottoman fire arms came in the reign of Beyazid II who improved the design of field artillery pieces and many other firearms ranging from muskets to 'tufeks'. To add to this the 16th century brought the latest technical advancements in gun making to the Ottomans; in the form of Jews fleeing from the Spanish Inquisition.

Ottoman artillery was famous for the size of its cannon, and their number; from the highly mobile anti-personnel Abus gun to the massive Great Turkish Bombard. These bombards were a product of specialised study in the production of 'giant guns' known literally as castle smashers 'kale-kob'. Although such weapons being primarily used in sieges; where they were cast on site due to the logistical difficulties attributed to transport them there, they were used as late as 1809 massive stone-firing guns were used with some effect against the Royal Navy during the Dardanelles operation, throwing 1000-pound marble with a range of 1 mile. Accuracy was achieved by using wadded shots wrapped in sheepskin with ready-measured stacks of powder. Unlike the European powder, the Ottoman powder is thought to be better for upon firing; it produced white smoke rather than black smoke.

The most famous battle in which these bronze 'bombards' were used is at the siege of Constantinople in 1453. The bombards weighed 19 tons, took 200 men and sixty oxen to emplace, and could fire just seven times a day. The Fall of Constantinople was perhaps "the first event of supreme importance whose result was determined by the use of artillery", when the huge bronze cannons of Mehmed II breached the city's walls, ending the Byzantine Empire, according to Sir Charles Oman.

The most commonly used gun is known as a battering gun (darbzen). This gun fired 0.15–2.5 kg shots in weight. These guns were used more in fortresses as the emphasis was given to small to medium-calibre guns. Small-calibre bronze pieces were also used on galleons and river boats; they weighed between 3.7 and 8.6 kg. However, most riverboats had an armoury of cast-iron guns which fired 500 g shots; on average they weighed between 20 and 40 kg. The 'balyemez' was a medium-weight, long-range cannon which fired shots weighing 31–74 kg. 'Şahalaz' was light cannon, mainly used on riverboats, and was a cast-iron cannon firing 500 g shots. 'Şayha' was a gun of various sizes used predominantly on riverboats mainly in the Danube. It weighed between 31 and 74 kg. The 16th and 17th centuries gave rise to other types of cannons which the Ottomans used, such as the'Saçma topu' (grapeshot) and the 'Ağaç topu' (petard).

=== Tents ===
Tents

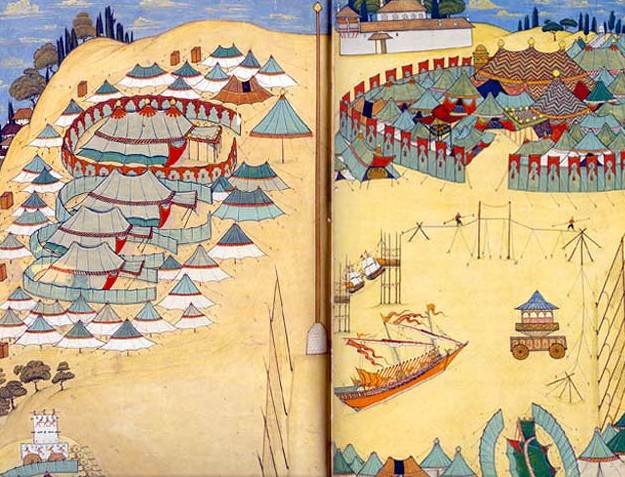
Military tents

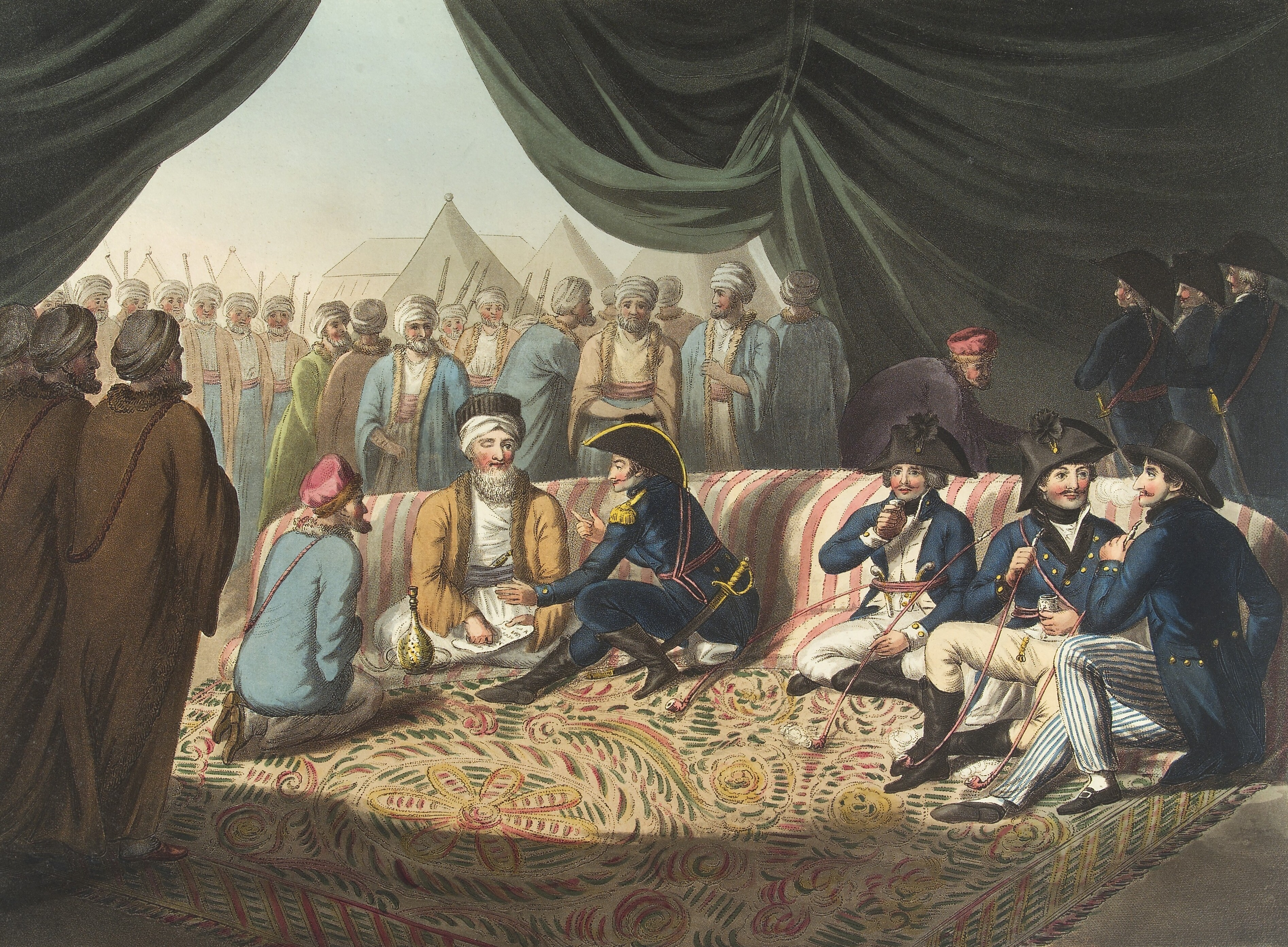
Grand Vizier's tent

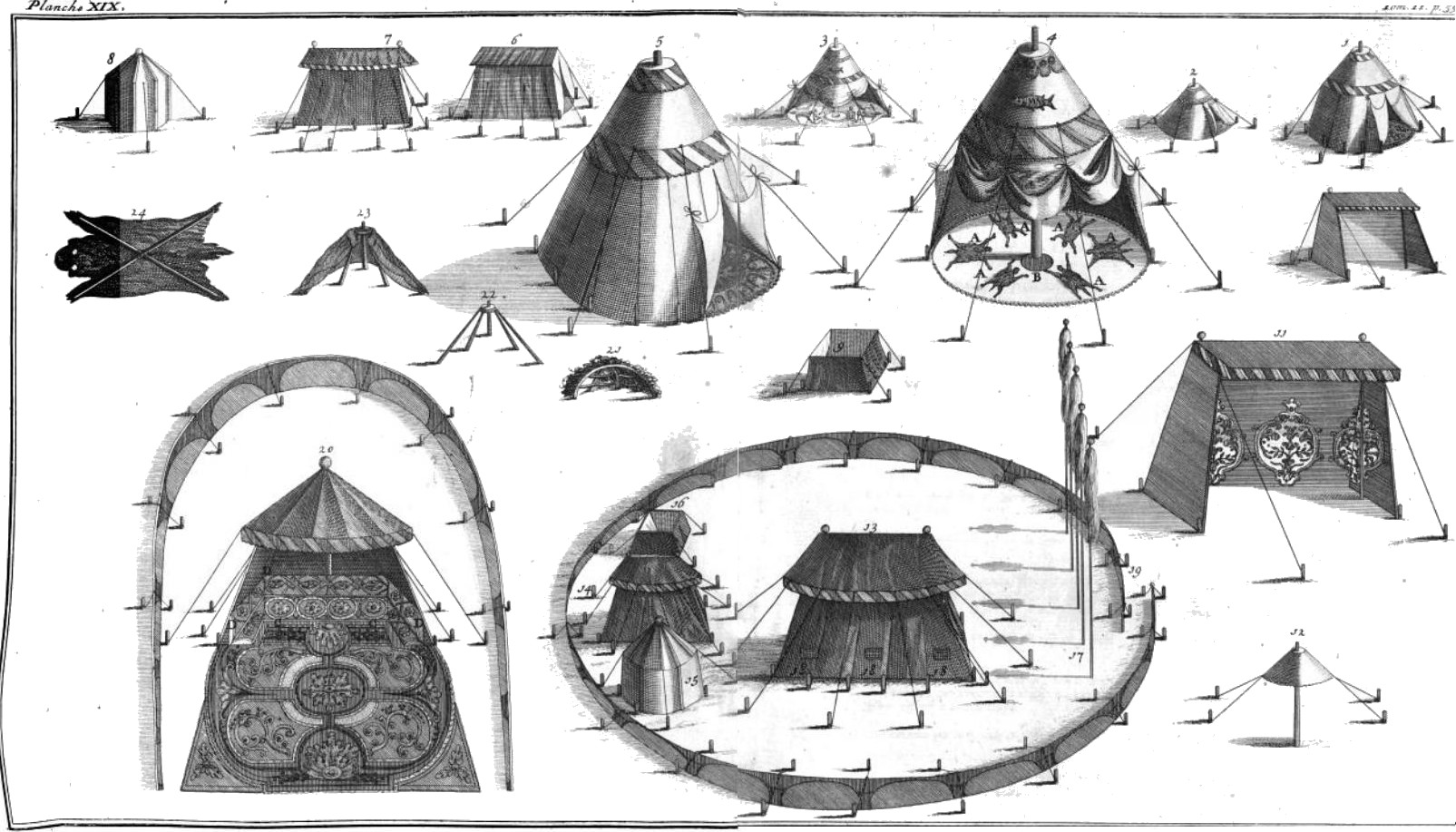
Classic Ottoman Army tents

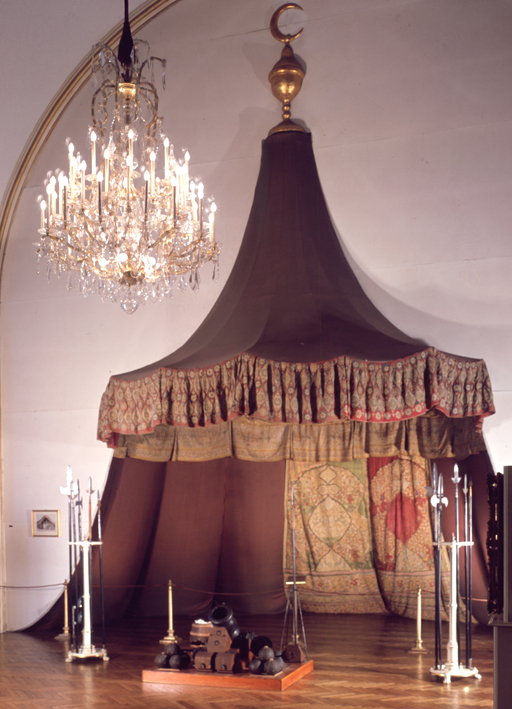
Early 18th tents

== Strength ==
=== 17th Century ===
A typical Ottoman army in 17th century might be composed of 50,000 timariots and 20,000 kapikulu. The Ottoman military was modest for an empire whose population probably exceeded 20,000,000 by the end of the 17th century.

=== Special: Artillery ===
Although the payroll registry records were not good at keeping up with the number of gunners because the comrades of those deceased collected the money on their behalf, the table below gives us a clear view of the trends.

The Size of the Ottoman Artillery Corps 1514–1769
Date	1514	1527	1567	1574	1598	1609	1660	1669	1687	1699	1702	1739	1769
Topcu	348	695	1204	1099	2827	1552	2026	2793	4949	4604	1269	7279	1351
Top Arabacıları	372	943	678	400	700	684	282	432	670	1074	470	2274	180
Cebeci	451	524	789	625	3000	5730	4180	4789	3503	9629	2462	9877	3691
Total	1171	2162	2671	2124	6527	7960	6488	8014	9122	15307	4201	19430	5222

== Bibliography ==
- Uzunçarşılı, İsmail Hakkı (1988). Osmanlı Devleti Teşkilatından Kapıkulu Ocakları: Acemi Ocağı ve Yeniçeri Ocağı. Ankara: Türk Tarih Kurumu. ISBN 975-16-0056-1.
- Zygulski, Zdzislaw (1991). Ottoman Art in the Service of Empire. NYU. ISBN 0814796710.
- Fanny Davis. Palace of Topkapi in Istanbul. 1970. ASIN B000NP64Z2
- Mantran, Robert (1998). La vita quotidiana a Constantinopoli ai tempi di Solimano il Magnifico e dei suoi successori (XVI e XVII secolo) (in Italian) (3 ed.). Milan: Rizzoli.
