= Trnovci =

Trnovci may refer to:

- Trnovci, Mogila, North Macedonia
- Trnovci, Sveti Tomaž, Slovenia
