= Djebedji =

Ottoman artillery unit

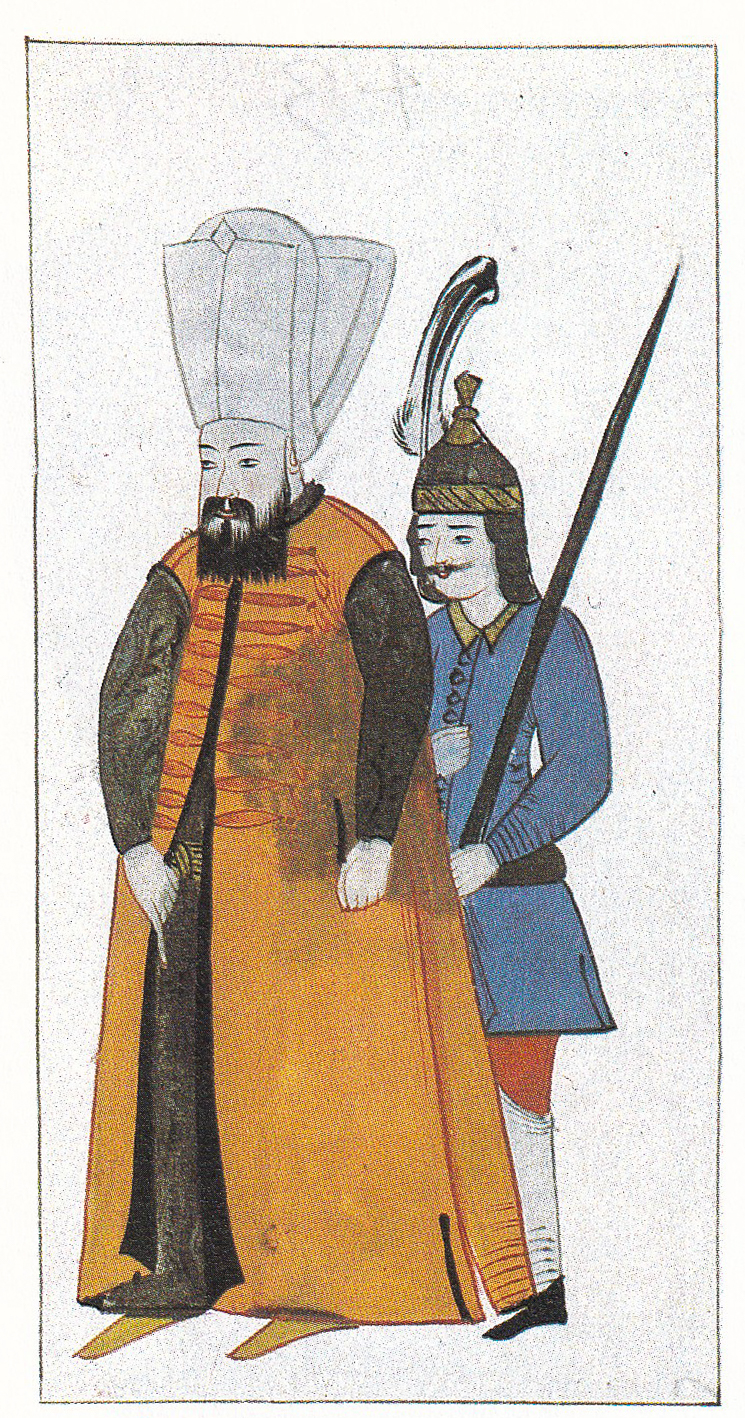
Djebedji bashi, commander

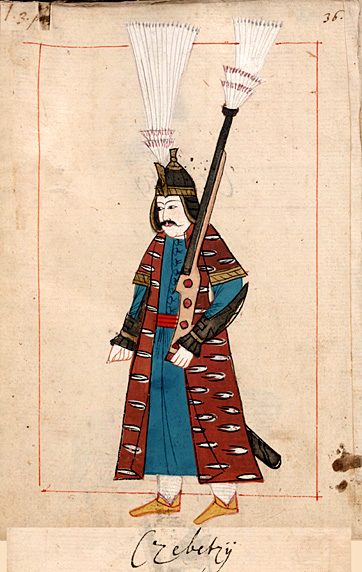
A Djebedji soldier

Djebedji (Turkish: Cebeci, pronounced [ˈdʒebedʒi]) was a military subunit of Ottoman Army's artillery corps. The Djebedji unit was in charge of maintenance and keeping the weaponry. They were also responsible in transporting weapons to where they were needed. During peace times, they kept the weaponry in arsenals named cephane. The Djebedji unit participated in all campaigns commanded by the sultan or the grand vizier. In other campaigns only a part of the unit participated.

Foundation date of the unit (Turkish: ocak) (pronounced [ˈodʒak]) is unknown, but it appears that the Djebedji unit was founded in the 15th century. It was one of the privileged units of the Ottoman army. They were considered as a part of the Kapıkulu corps and based on the devshirme system. Their commander was called "Djebedji-bashi" (Turkish: cebecibaşı). The unit was small and selected, numbering no more than 625 men in 1574. In most Istanbul revolts during the stagnation and decline periods of the Ottoman Empire, the Djebedji units acted together with the Janissary, and in 1826, when the Janissary was abolished by Sultan Mahmud II following the Auspicious Incident, Djebedji units were also abolished.

== Sources ==
- Nicolae Iorga:Geschiste des Osmanischen Reiches II (translated by Nilüfer Epçeli) Yeditepe yayınevi, İstanbul, ISBN 975-6480-21-1 pp. 296, 376
- Stanford Shaw, History of the Ottoman Empire and Modern Turkey Vol I Cambridge ISBN 0-521-29163-1 p. 139
