= Demir Hisar (town) =

Demir Hisar Демир Хисар (Macedonian)
- Town
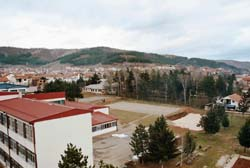

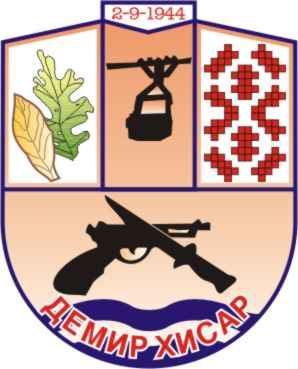
- Flag Coat of arms

- Location within North Macedonia
- Coordinates: 41°13′15″N 21°12′11″E
- Country: North Macedonia
- Region: Pelagonia
- Municipality: Demir Hisar

Government
  - Mayor: Nikola Najdovski (VMRO-DPMNE)

Population (2021)
  - Total: 2,431
- Time zone: UTC+1 (CET)
  - Summer (DST): UTC+2 (CEST)
- Area code: (+389) 047
- Vehicle registration: DH
- Climate: Cfb

Demir Hisar (Macedonian: Демир Хисар [dɛˈmir‿xisar]), formerly Murgaševo until 1946, is a small town in North Macedonia. It is the seat of Demir Hisar Municipality.

== Etymology ==
The name of the town comes from Ottoman Turkish Demir Hisar (Iron Fortress) when the settlement was part of the Ottoman Empire.

== History ==
In the 1467/1468 Ottoman defter, Murgaševo had 115 households, 8 bachelors and 3 widows. The majority of household heads bore Slavic or general Christian personal names; however, when including kinship ties, the Albanian element constituted just under a quarter.

In statistics gathered by Vasil Kanchov in 1900, the village of Murgaševo was inhabited by 240 Muslim Albanians. In 1905 in statistics gathered by Dimitar Mishev Brancoff, Murgaševo was inhabited by 240 Muslim Albanians. The population of Demir Hisar (Murgaševo) at this time were Tosks, a southern subgroup of Albanians. In the 2010s, only three Albanian families remained in Demir Hisar and nearby Albanian villagers from Obednik are assisting the community in efforts to repair the dilapidated old village mosque.

== Demographics ==
The Yugoslav census of 1953 recorded 902 people in Demir Hisar of whom 449 were Macedonians, 412 Turks, 27 Albanians and 14 others. The 1961 Yugoslav census recorded 1129 people of whom 1047 were Macedonians, 39 Albanians, 24 Turks, and 19 others. The 1971 Yugoslav census recorded 1828 people of whom 1731 were Macedonians, 34 Turks, 30 Albanians, 4 Romani, 1 Bosniak and 28 others. The 1981 Yugoslav census recorded 2283 people of whom were 2145 Macedonians, 75 Albanians, 19 Turks, 17 Romani and 27 others. The Macedonian census of 1994 recorded 2447 people of whom 2336 were Macedonians, 9 Albanians, 4 Turks and 98 others. According to the 2002 census, the town had a total of 2593 inhabitants. Ethnic groups in the village include:

- Macedonians 2,473 (95.37%)
- Albanians 62 (2.39%)
- Turks 22 (0.85%)
- Romani 11 (0.42%)
- Serbs 7 (0.27%)
- Vlachs 6 (0.23%)
- Bosniaks 2 (0.08%)
- Others 10 (0.39%)

As of the 2021 census, Demir Hisar had 2,431 residents with the following ethnic composition:

- Macedonians 2,281 (93.8%)
- Persons for whom data are taken from administrative sources 69 (2.8%)
- Albanians 39 (1.6%)
- Roma 16 (0.7%)
- Vlachs 9 (0.4%)
- Serbs 5 (0.2%)
- Others 12 (0.5%)

== Gallery ==
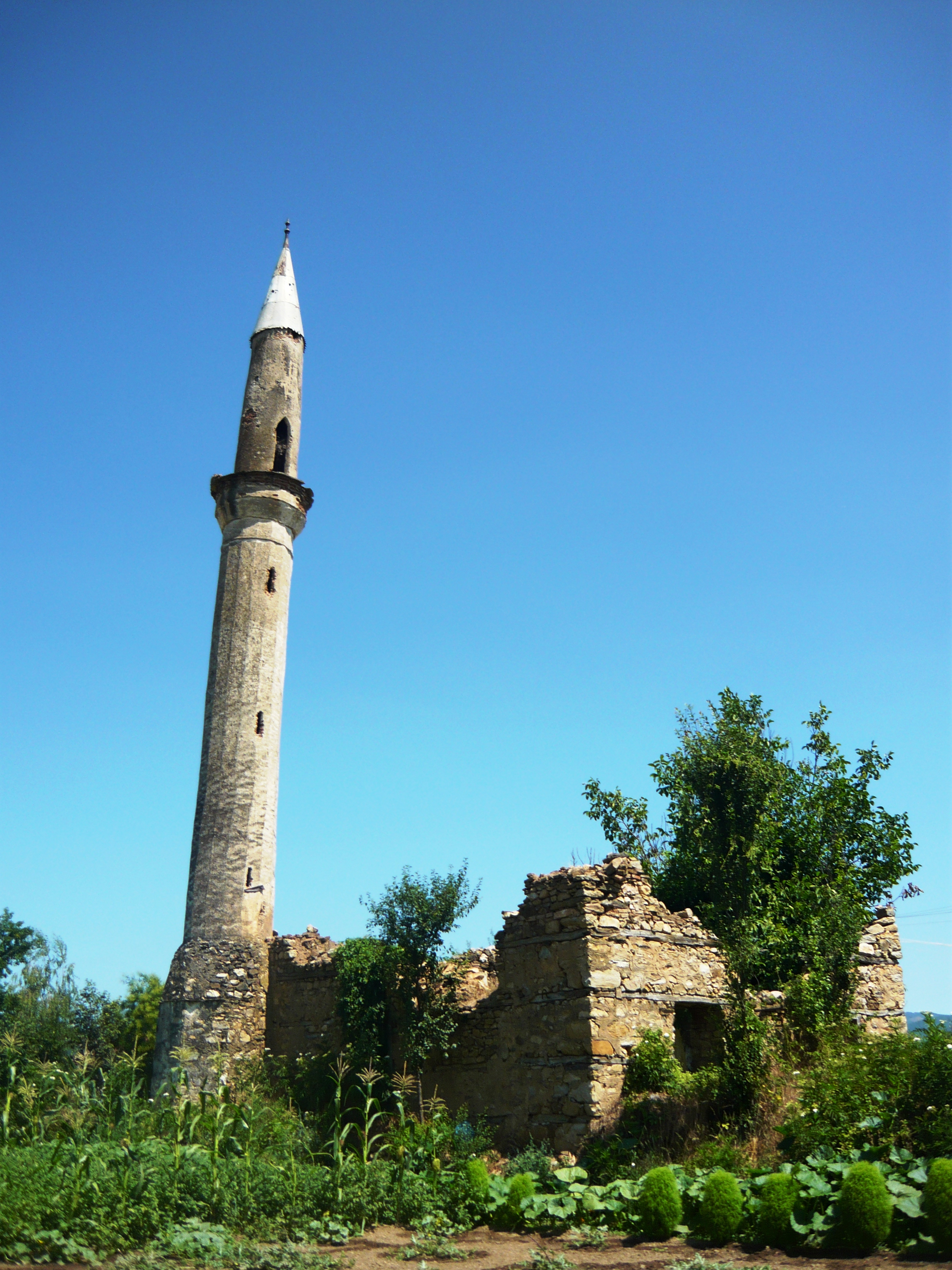
Old Ottoman-era mosque of Murgaševo (Demir Hisar)

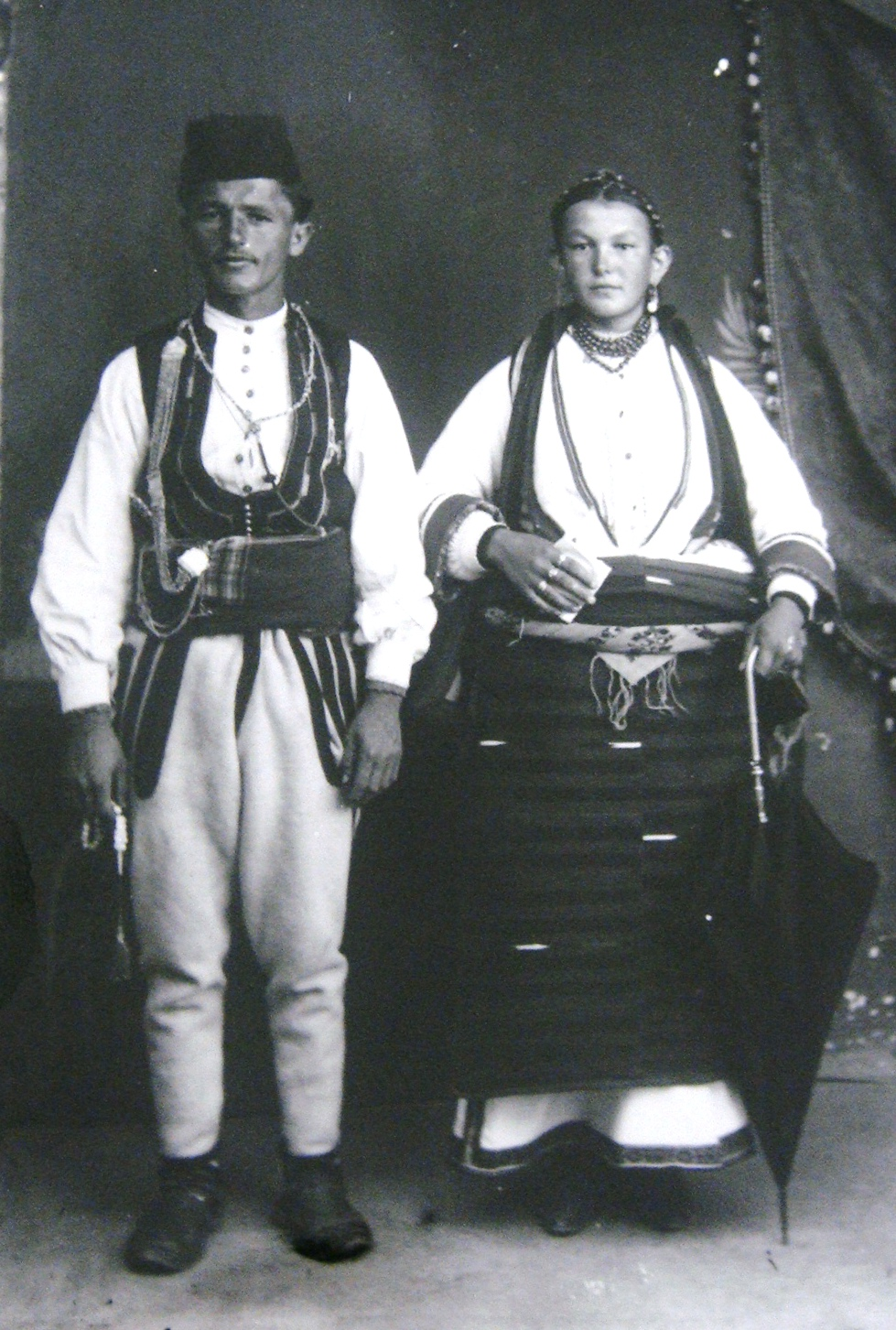
Couple of Demir Hisar, dressed in folklore costume, photographed in the studio of the brothers Manaki in Bitola, 1916

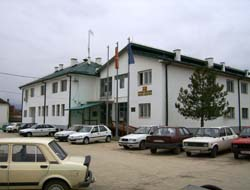
Council Seats House of Demir Hisar

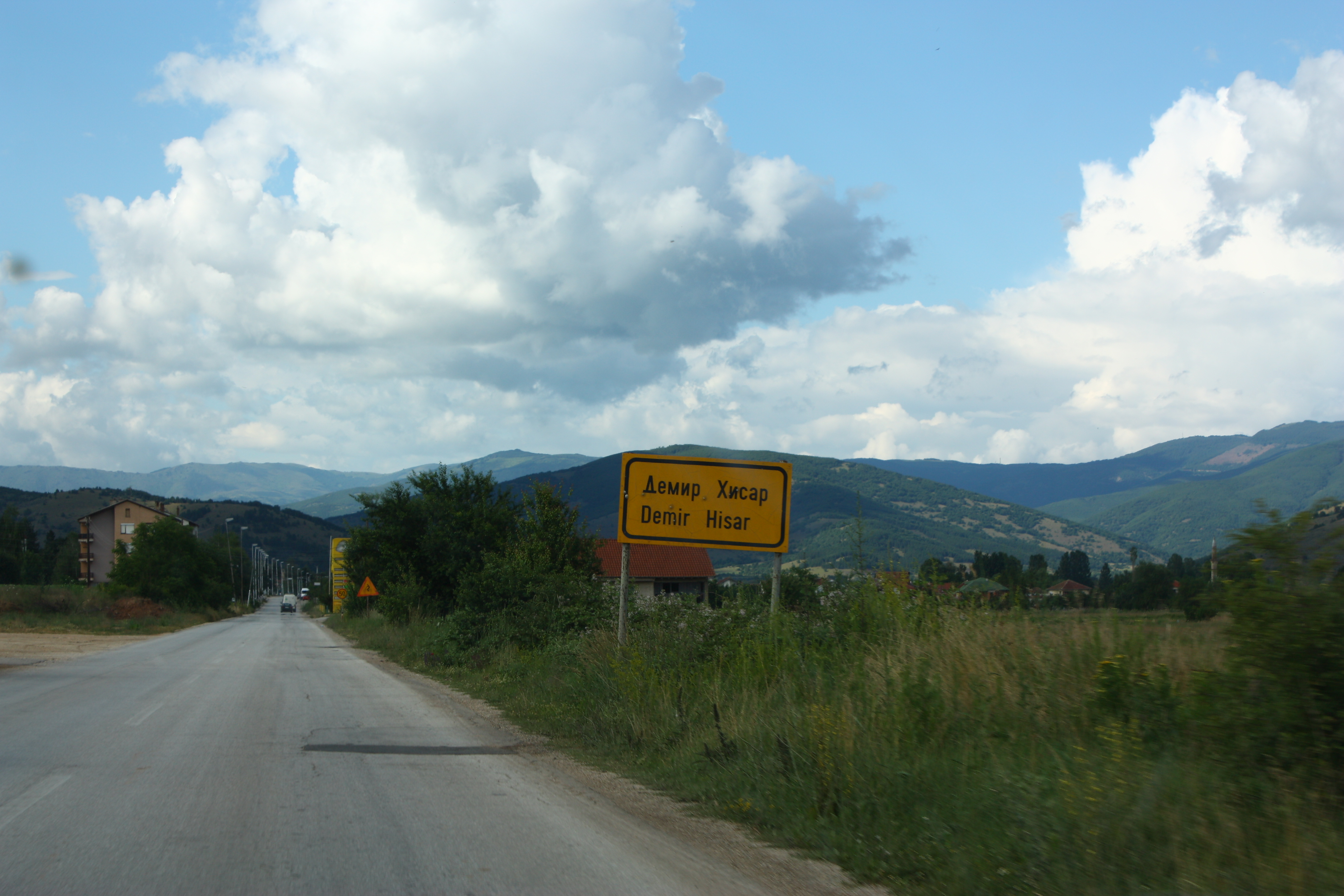
Main road to Demir Hisar, 2010

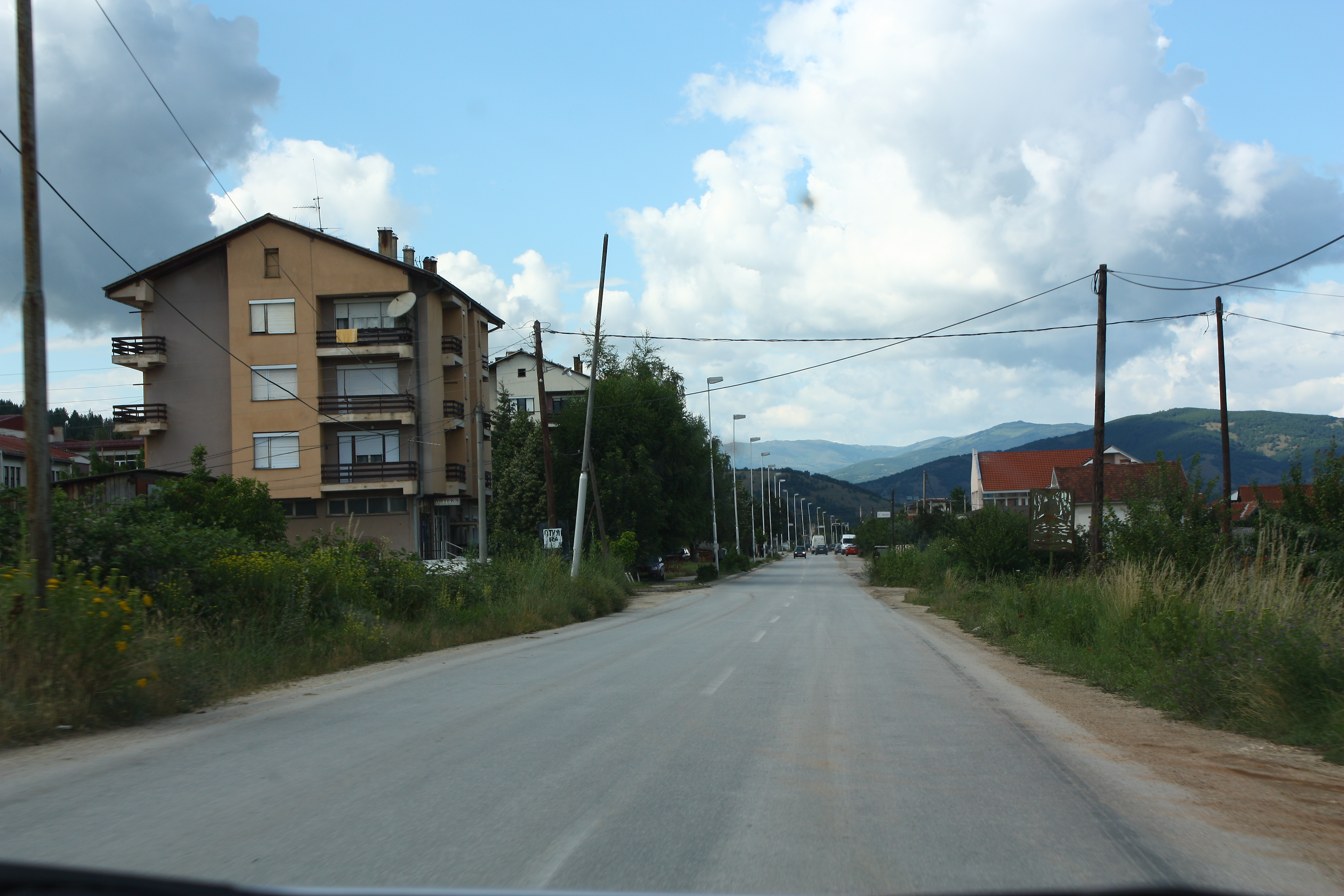
Streets in Demir Hisar, 2010
