= Kapıkulu =

Professional, standing troops of the Ottoman Empire

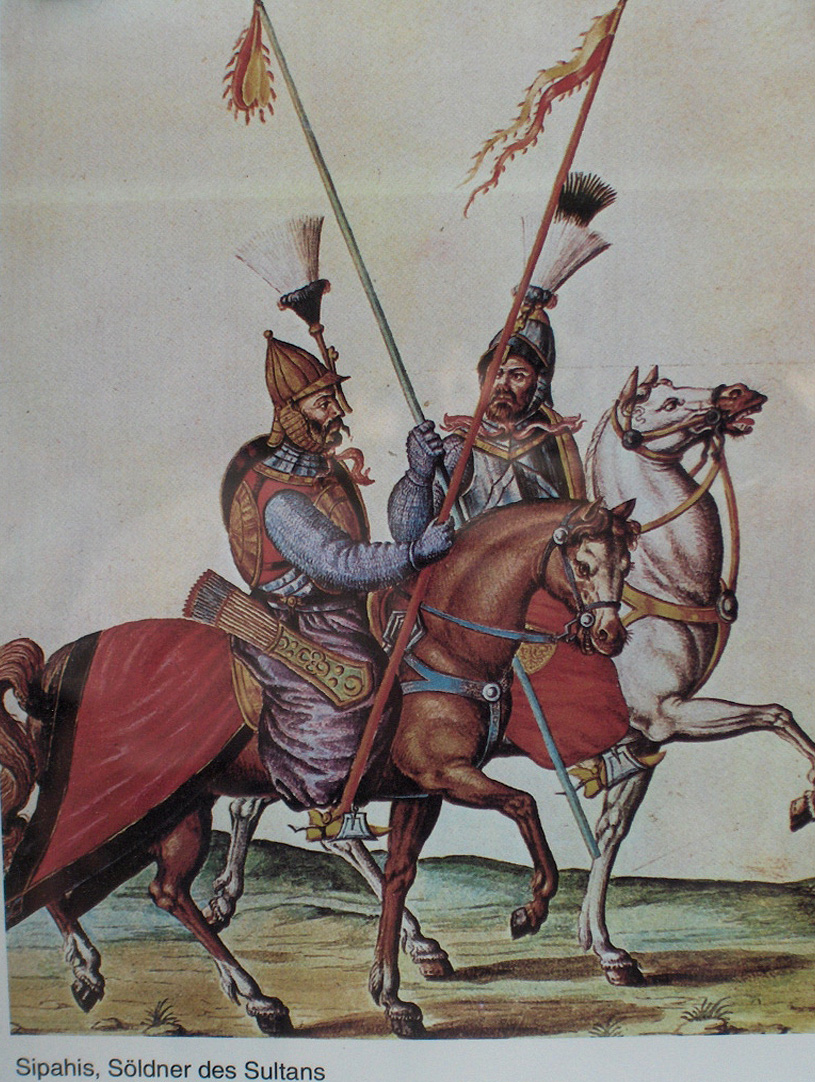
Sipahis at the Battle of Vienna

Kapıkulu (Ottoman Turkish: قپوقولی اوجاغی, Kapıkulu Ocağı, "Slaves of the Sublime Porte") was the collective name for the household division of the Ottoman Sultans. They included the Janissary infantry corps as well as the Six Divisions of Cavalry. Unlike provincial levies such as the timariots and irregular forces (levend), the kapıkulu were professional, standing troops, mostly drawn through the devshirme system. They formed the backbone of the military of the Ottoman Empire during its "classical period", from the 15th century until the Auspicious Incident of 15 June 1826 that led to the abolition of the kapıkulu during the Tanzimat.

== See also ==
- Ottoman Army
