= Trnovci, Mogila =

Trnovci
- Village
- Трновци; Tërnoc
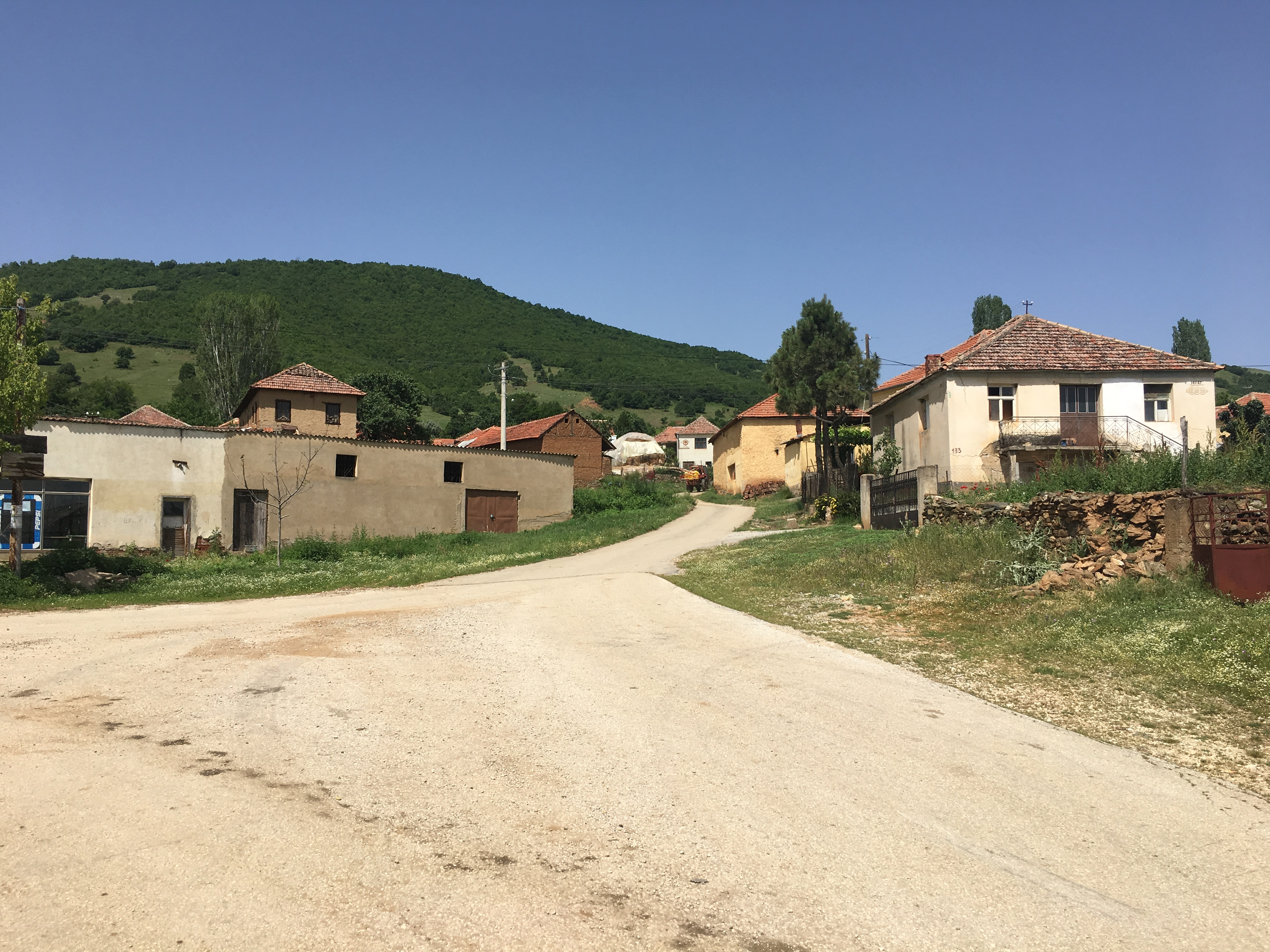
- Houses in the village Trnovci

- Location within North Macedonia
- Coordinates: 41°15′N 21°20′E
- Country: North Macedonia
- Region: Pelagonia
- Municipality: Mogila

Population (2002)
  - Total: 427
- Time zone: UTC+1 (CET)
  - Summer (DST): UTC+2 (CEST)
- Car plates: BT
- Website: .

Trnovci (Macedonian: Трновци, Albanian: Tërnoc) is a village located in a highland area in the municipality of Mogila, North Macedonia.

== Demographics ==
Trnovci traditionally contains a Torbeš population. Between 1954 - 1960 large scale migration from Trnovci by Macedonian-speaking Muslims to Turkey occurred of which 70 households left especially during 1954–1955, while Orthodox Macedonians from the Demir Hisar region settled in the village. The Macedonian-speaking Muslim inhabitants of Trnovci do not use the term Torbeš for themselves instead they use the term Turci (Turks) and among them there are many who are also of Albanian and Turkish descent. Macedonian-speaking Muslims from Trnovci refer to the surrounding Christian population as Makedonci (Macedonians) and those Orthodox Macedonians refer to them as Turci (Turks) due to they being Muslims.

According to the 2002 census, the village had a total of 427 inhabitants. Ethnic groups in the village include:

- Macedonians 383
- Albanians 30
- Turks 13
- Others 1

According to the 2021 census, the village had a total of 280 inhabitants. Ethnic groups in the village include:

- Macedonians 193
- Albanians 51
- Bosniaks 30
- Others 3
- PWDTAS 25
