= Dervendjis =

Derbendcis
- Allegiance: Ottoman Empire
- Type: auxiliary force
- Role: constabulary
- Part of: tabl of 30 men
- Equipment: light weapon and fire guns

Derbendcis or Derbentler were the most important and largest Ottoman military auxiliary constabulary units usually responsible for guarding important roads, bridges, fords or mountain passes. Usually, the population of an entire village near some important pass would be assigned with derbendci status in exchange for tax exemptions.

== Etymology ==
The name is derived from a Persian word Dar-band meaning "pass", "gateway" or "closer of the door".

== History ==
The Ottomans had common practice to exempt some of their tax-paying subjects (rayah) from paying certain taxes in exchange for some services. In case of derbendcis this also included military services such as guarding mountain passes. Usually the entire villages were assigned with this duty and exempted from paying war time taxes (Turkish: avarız-ı divaniyye), customary taxes (Turkish: tekâlif-i örfiye), service as oarsmen in the Ottoman navy and devşirme of their boys into janissaries. In the region of northern Macedonia at least 175 villages had derbendci status and enjoyed these kind of tax exemptions. Sometimes the Ottoman state "created" villages around derbend territories while in some cases the existing villages applied to their kadı to receive derbendci status in exchange for providing security, constructing or maintaining roads and bridges. Newly settled population of such villages was not exempt from paying avariz taxes.

Their duty was to patrol the territory they were assigned to (derbend), similar to immobile gendarmerie. Since the end of the 18th century derbendcis were organized within Derbendat Ministry (Turkish: Derbendat Başbuğluğu) that appointed derbend aghas (Turkish: derbendat başbuğ) whose post lasted one year.

Derbendci status was compulsory and hereditary. If some individual or group would escape from their duty, the Ottomans would forcefully return them. They were organized into simple structures of 30 men (tabl) whose members performed rotational duties. Initially they carried only light weapons and later also fire guns. Significant part of this units were Christians who were, because of their derbendci duty, allowed to ride horses and carry weapon, but only of conventional type. Because derbendcis were poorly motivated, they could not match trained and better armed soldiers, so the Ottomans had to hire mercenaries (Christians or Muslims) to ensure loyalty of derbendcis, especially since the beginning of the decline of the Ottoman Empire at the end of the 17th century.

== Sources ==
- Uyar, Mesut; Erickson, Edward J. (2009). A Military History of the Ottomans: From Osman to Atatürk. ABC-CLIO. ISBN 978-0-275-98876-0.
- Ursinus, Michael (2012). Grievance Administration (Sikayet) in an Ottoman Province: The Kaymakam of Rumelia's 'Record Book of Complaints' of 1781-1783. Routledge. ISBN 978-1-134-24328-0.
