= Obednik =

Obednik Обедник Obetnik
- Village
- Air view of the village

- Location within North Macedonia
- Coordinates: 41°10′N 21°10′E
- Country: North Macedonia
- Region: Pelagonia
- Municipality: Demir Hisar

Population (2021)
  - Total: 239
- Time zone: UTC+1 (CET)
  - Summer (DST): UTC+2 (CEST)
- Car plates: DH
- Website: .

Obednik (Macedonian: Обедник, Albanian: Obetnik) is a village in the municipality of Demir Hisar, North Macedonia. This village is only 5 to 7 km (3.1 to 4.3 mi) away from the historic village of Smilevo. Obednik has many tobacco fields, and is surrounded by mountains.

== Demographics ==
Obednik is attested in the Ottoman defter of 1467/68 as a village in the vilayet of Manastir. The village had 64 households аnd 1 widow. The inhabitants attested largely bore Slavic anthroponyms. while a minority bore mixed Slavic-Albanian anthroponyms, such as Zgur son of Millosh, Rale son of Gin, Kojo son of Radosllav etc.

In statistics gathered by Vasil Kanchov in 1900, the village of Obednik was inhabited by 250 Muslim Albanians.

According to the 2002 census, the village had a total of 273 inhabitants. Ethnic groups in the village include: Albanians 139 and Macedonians 134

According to the census of 2021, the village had 239 inhabitants, of whom were 152 Albanians, 79 Macedonians and 8 people without data
