= Murga (disambiguation) =

Murga is a form of popular musical theatre.

Murga may also refer to:

== Places ==
=== Australia ===
- Murga, New South Wales

=== Iran ===
- Murga, Khuzestan
- Murga, Kohgiluyeh and Boyer-Ahmad

=== Other ===
- Murga, Bulgaria
- Murga, Hungary
- Murga, Álava, village in Ayala/Aiara municipality, Spain
- Murga (peak), mountain in Kosovo

== People ==
- Carli de Murga
- Francisco de Murga
- Romeo Murga

== Other ==
- Murga punishment, stress position used as a punishment in parts of South Asia
- La Murga, 1963 Argentine film

== See also ==
- Murgas (disambiguation)
- Instituto de Higiene del Doctor Murga, a destroyed landmark in Spain
