= Beranci =

Beranci Беранци
- Village
- Location within North Macedonia
- Coordinates: 41.159243°N 21.358179°E
- Country: North Macedonia
- Region: Pelagonia
- Municipality: Mogila

Population (2002)
  - Total: 445
- Time zone: UTC+1 (CET)
  - Summer (DST): UTC+2 (CEST)
- Website: .

Beranci (Macedonian: Беранци) is a village in the municipality of Mogila, North Macedonia.

== Etymology ==
The village is first mentioned as Beranci in 1468, in Ottoman documents. It is believed that the name derives from the personal name, Beran. According to the legend, the first settler was someone named Beran (or Beron) from the village of Vevčani, near Struga, attempting to escape Turkish brutality.

== Geography ==
The village is situated in Pelagonia, in the northern part of the Bitola valley, and the western part of the Municipality of Mogila. The village is at an altitude of 640 meters. It is situated 17 km from Bitola.

The surrounding villages are Dolno Srpci, Vašarejca and Mogila.

== History ==
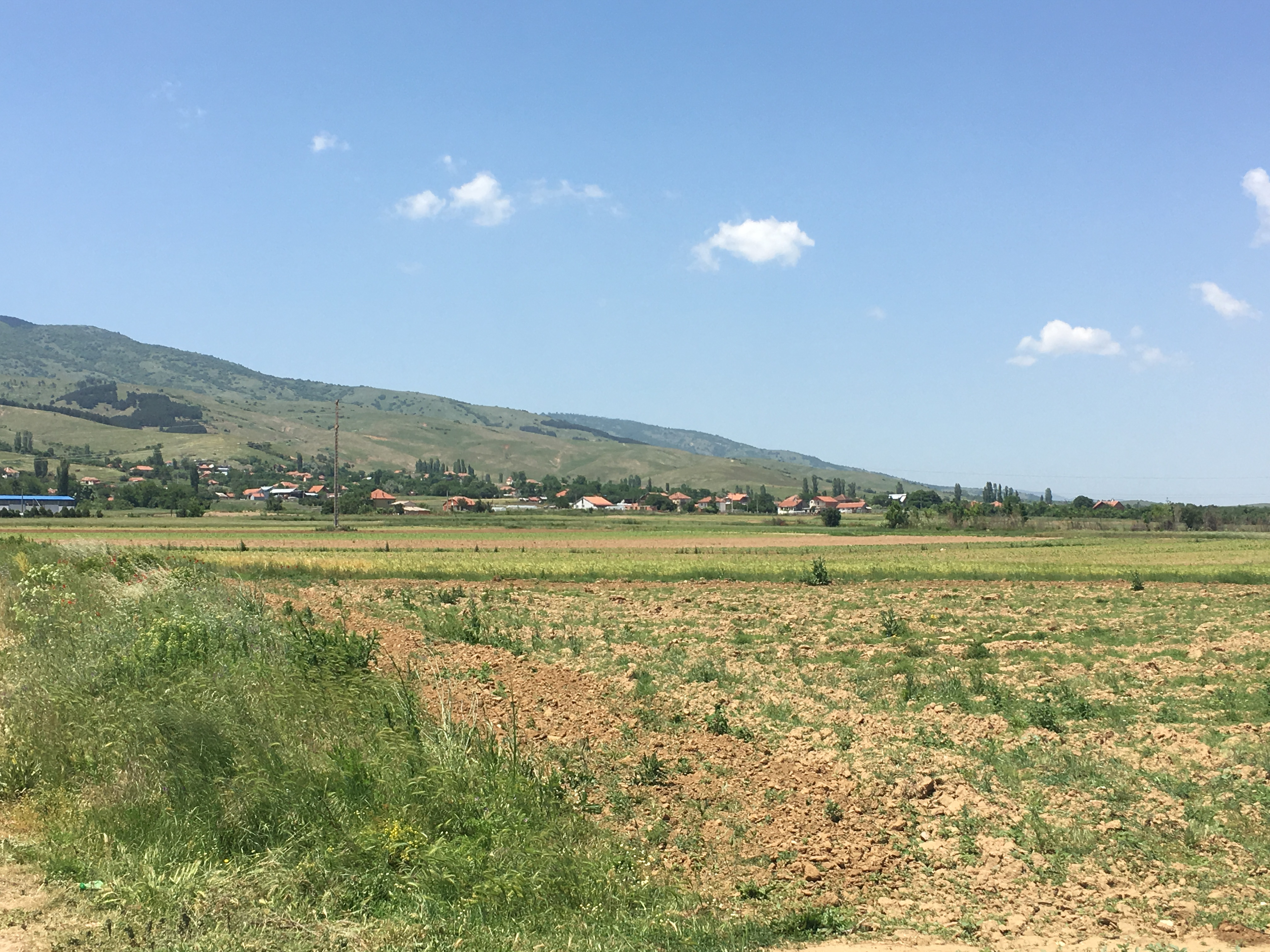
View of the village from the valley

In Beranci and its surroundings, there are a number of important archeological findings. Gradište is located west of the village, with the locals claiming that it is a mound with valleys. Old money, tiles, large peaks and bricks were found at the site.

The location of Visoi is located where the villages of Beranci, Mogila and Crnobuki meet. A 1954 study unearthed old graves lined up in a circle, with Roman inscriptions being unearthed, and pottery being found inside the tombs.

The church of Saint Athanasius is located in the upper half of the village, in which it is believed that an ancient necropolis is located. The current monastery of Saint John the Baptist, is built on the ruins of the older monastery.

In the 19th century, Beranci was under the Manastir Vilayer of the Ottoman Empire.

== Economy ==
The area covers an area of 19 km^{2}. It is dominated by arable land with an area of 1,028.3 hectares, with pastures occupying 785.5 hectares, and forests only 15 hectares.

The main function of the village concerns farming and livestock.

== Demographics ==
According to the 1467-68 Ottoman defter, the anthroponyms of Beranci consisted of a mixed Slav-Albanian anthroponomy - usually a Slavic first name and an Albanian last name or last names with Albanian patronyms and Slavic suffixes.

According to the 2002 census, the village had a total of 445 inhabitants. Ethnic groups in the village include:

- Macedonians 445

=== Families ===
Beranci is a Macedonian Orthodox village, with there only being one native family, with the rest being settlers.

The families of Beranci are:

- Natives: Ralevci; it is said they have lived in Beranci for a long time.
- Settlers: Pecevci, descend from their ancestor Pece, who came to Beranci from the surroundings of Debar in the 18th century; Popovci, a branch of the family Pecevci; Bojovci, settled from a village in Mariovo; Nikolovci, are a branch of the family Bojovci; Veljanovci, settled from the neighbouring Dolno Srpci; Jazevci, settled from a village in Mariovo; Gajdovci, are a branch of the Jazevci family; Gargovci, are descended from a man who married into the family Pecevci, Ljakovci, Kumbulovci, Bočkarovci, and Gjakovci, are settlers from unknown places, the family Ruškić was established by a policeman who came from Negotin in Serbia in 1919; and Damjanovci, settled from the village Virovo, near Demir Hisar in 1955.

== Cultural and natural sights ==
Archeological findings

- Visoi — iron time tumulus
- Voden Dol — necropolis from Roman times
- Grabečka Reka — settlement from ancient and Roman times
- Gradište — settlement from late-antiquity;
- Ženski Dol — necropolis from late-antiquity
- Ploči — settlement and necropolis from Roman times
- Ristov Kladenec — necropolis from late-antiquity
- Crkvište — necropolis from early-ancient times
- Šukalovec — settlement from Roman times
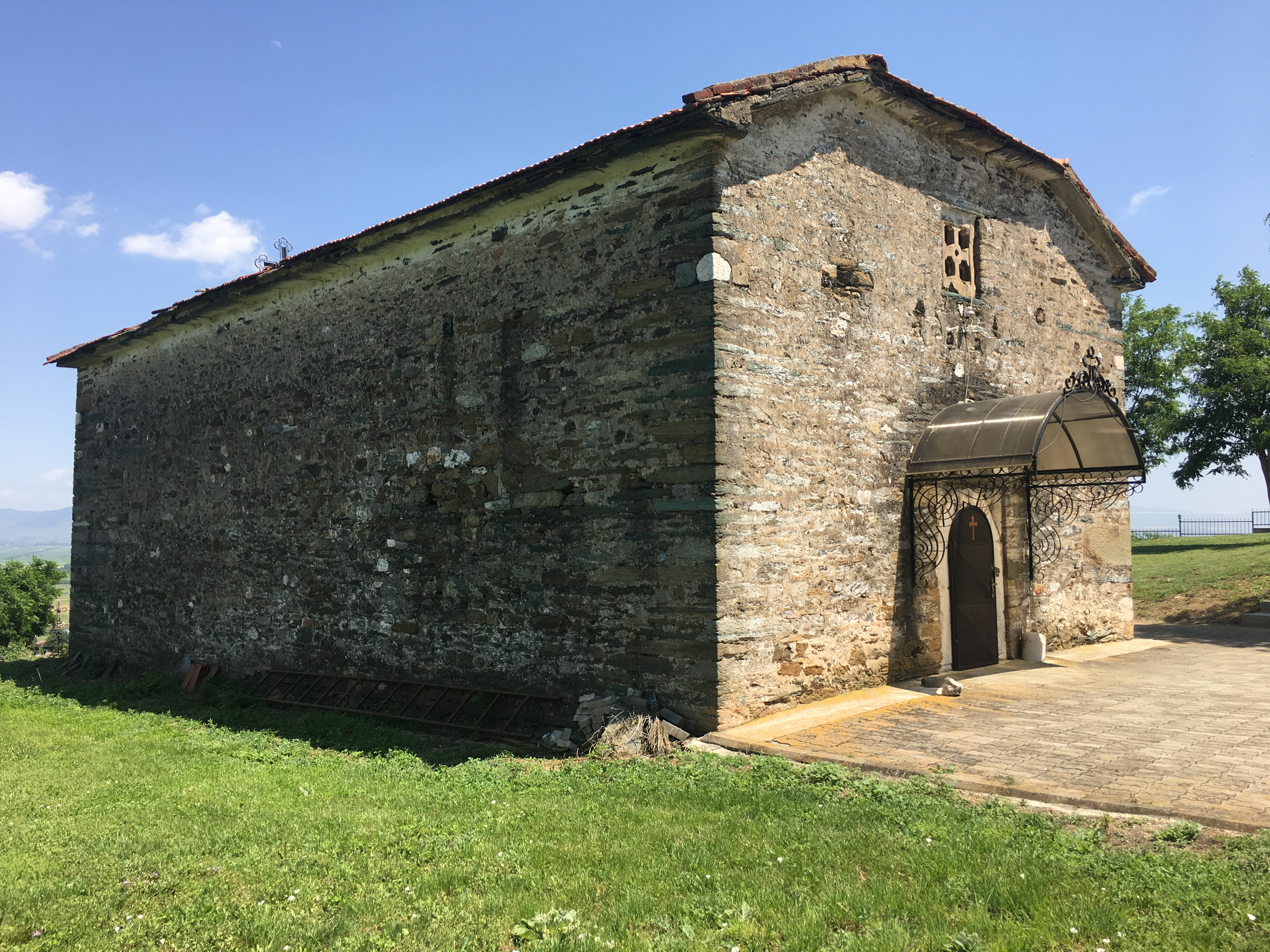
  View of the main church, Saint Athanasius.

Churches

- Church of St. Athanasius — main church
- Church of St. John the Baptist — monasterial church
- Church of St. Constantine and Helena — new church

Monasteries

- Beranci Monastery — an old monastery

== Notable residents ==
Born in Beranci

- Vele Mačkarov — a village voivoda of IMRO, participated in the defence of the Kruševo Republic in the cheta of Pitu Guli.

Descent from Beranci

- Alexander Volkanovski — a UFC champion. Born in Australia. His father was born in Beranci.

== Emigration ==
It is known about the following emigrant families from the village: Karovci in Dragožani; Pishmanovci in Ivanjevci; Zajkovci, Minovci and Veljanchevci in Dolno Srpci; Gjakovci and Jazevci in Mogila; Kovačevci in Dobromiri and Nečovci in Kravari.

Over 1000 people have emigrated from the village. The greater part of them live in Bitola, Prilep and Skopje, with some emigrating to the anglosphere and Europe.
