= Timeline of the First Balkan War =

This is a timeline of the First Balkan War (1912–1913)

== Events ==
- Battle of Tuzi (9–15 October), Montenegrin victory.
- Serbian–Ottoman border skirmishes (15–19 October), Ottoman retreat
- Greek capture of Lemnos (18–21 October).
- Serbian First Army order of Kumanovo operation (20 October), crossing border.
- Serbian liberation of Preševo (20 October).
- Serbian Third Army advance (21 October).
- Battle of Kardzhali (21 October), Bulgarian victory.
- Serbian liberation of Pristina (22 October).
- Battle of Kirk Kilisse (22–24 October), Bulgarian victory.
- Battle of Sarantaporo (22–23 October), Greek victory.
- Battle of Kumanovo (23–24 October), Serbian victory, Ottoman retreat to Skopje, Štip, Veles.
- Ottoman defence of Vardar abandoned (24–25 October), retreat to Prilep.
- Serbian liberation of Skopje (26 October).
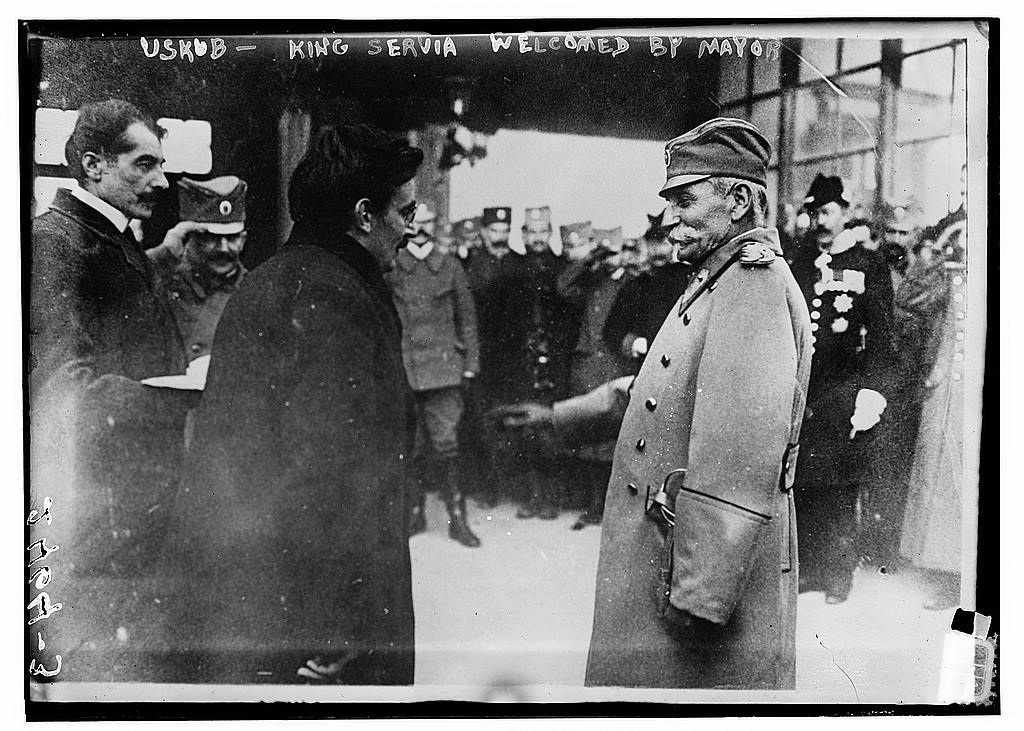
  Serbian king Peter I welcomed to liberated Skopje.
- Beginning of siege of Scutari by Montenegrin forces (28 October).
- Battle of Lule Burgas (28 October–2 November), Bulgarian victory.
- Battle of Prilep (3–5 November), Serbian victory.
- Beginning of siege of Adrianople (3 November) by Bulgarian–Serbian forces.
- Battle of Bitola (16–19 November), Serbian victory.
- First Battle of Çatalca (17–18 October), Ottoman victory.
- Battle of Yenidje (1–2 November), Greek victory.
- Battle of Pente Pigadia (6–12 November), Greek victory.
- Battle of Kaliakra (21 November), Bulgarian victory.
- Battle of Merhamli (27 November), Bulgarian victory.
- Battle of Sorovich (2–6 November [O.S. 21–24 October] 1912), Ottoman victory.
- Battle of Gribova (5–6 November [O.S. 23–24 October] 1912), Greek victory.
- Himara revolt (18 November [O.S. 5 November] 1912), Greek victory.
- Battle of Lesbos (21 November–21 December 1912), Greek victory.
- Battle of Chios (1912) (24 November 1912–3 January 1913), Greek victory.
- Siege of Ioannina (25 November 1912–5 March 1913), Greek victory.
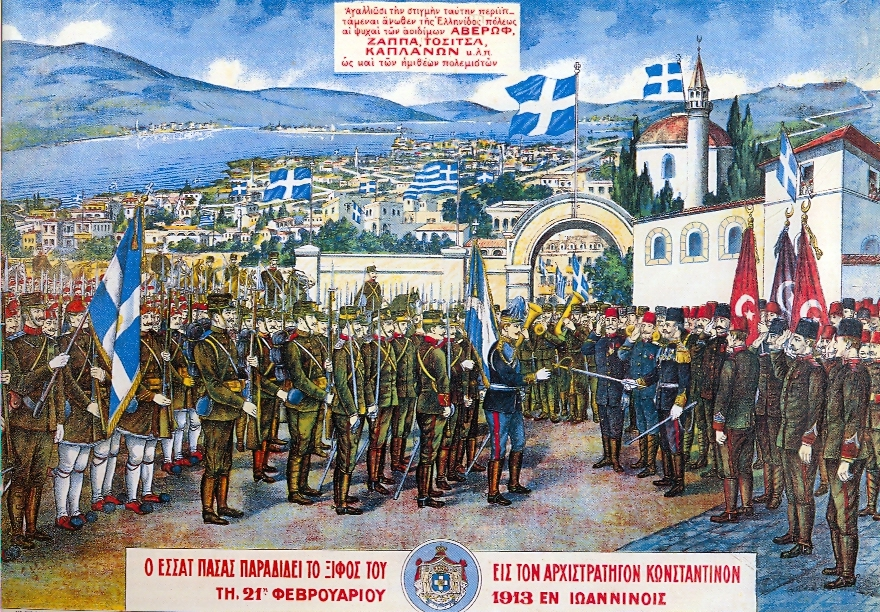
  Greek liberation of Ioannina.
- Battle of Elli (16 December [O.S. 3 December] 1912), Greek victory.
- Greek capture of Korytsa (20 December 1912).
- Battle of Lemnos (18 January [O.S. 5 January] 1913), Greek victory.
- Beginning of Second Battle of Çatalca (3 February 1913).
- Battle of Bulair (8 February 1913), Bulgarian victory.
- Battle of Şarköy (9–11 February 1913), Bulgarian victory.
- Battle of Bizani (4–6 March [O.S. 19–21 February] 1913), Greek victory.
- End of siege of Adrianople (26 March), Bulgarian–Serbian victory.
- End of siege of Scutari (23 April), Montenegrin–Serbian victory.
- Battle of Driskos (26–28 November O.S.), Ottoman victory.

== Sources ==
- Erickson, Edward J. (2003). Defeat in Detail: The Ottoman Army in the Balkans, 1912–1913. Greenwood Publishing Group. ISBN 0-275-97888-5.
- Hall, Richard C. Hall (2002) [2000]. The Balkan Wars 1912-1913: Prelude to the First World War. Routledge. ISBN 0-203-13805-8.
