= 2nd Infantry Regiment of 2nd Call =

Serbian military unit active in the Balkan Wars and World War I

- Officers of the regiment.
- Founded: 7 October 1912
- Disbanded: 1918–1920
- Allegiance: Serbia
- Branch: Royal Serbian Army
- Type: Ground Forces
- Part of: Morava II Division organized into: Third Field Army (October 1912); First Field Army (Second Balkan War); First Field Army (World War I)
- Garrison/HQ: Prokuplje (wartime), Niš (peacetime)
- Engagements: First Balkan War; Second Balkan War; World War I

Commanders
- Commander: Dušan Vasić

The 2nd Infantry Regiment of 2nd Call (Serbian: 2. пешадијски пук II позива) was a regiment of the Royal Serbian Army, belonging to the Morava Oblast Division. It was a 2nd Call-regiment, meaning it mobilized men between ages 31 and 38. It was one of three regiments organized in the Morava II Division (made up of the three 2nd Call regiments as well as a Cavalry Division and an Artillery Division), and included four battalions. The mobilization for the First Balkan War began at the beginning of October 1912. The men of the regiment all hailed from the Toplica region.

== First Balkan War ==
The 2nd Infantry Regiment of 2nd Call was one of four regiments mobilized in the Toplica region.

During the Balkan Wars (1912–1913) the regiment was part of the Morava II Division under commander pukovnik (colonel) Milovan Nedić. The regiment's commander was potpukovnik (lieutenant colonel) Dušan Vasić. The regiment was armed during the mobilization with refurbished M. 80 rifles which unfortunately were prone to break, as well as machine guns they had no training for. There was also incomplete supply of uniforms, which made the 2nd Class-regiments easy to spot with differing combinations of military uniform and peasant clothing. Despite this, the mobilized men were exalted, with very high moral.

The Morava II Division was part of the Serbian Third Field Army, which operated towards Kosovo and Metohija. The Division approached the border on 15 October, and the next day a clash ensued at Merdare, initiated independently by the Lab Chetnik commander Vojislav Tankosić. Tankosić's attack on Ottoman guard towers led to Ottoman border troops attacking the regiment, which managed to courageously fight them off with the help of the Šumadija 7th Infantry Regiment which on its own initiative attacked the Ottoman troops rear. The war on the Ottoman Empire was proclaimed on 18 October, and the next day victories on the battlefield opened the way to Podujevo and Pristina. The regiment fought off armed bands and distinguished itself in a battle outside Pristina, then entered the town as liberators. Next, the Morava II troops took Uroševac and Kačanik (25–26 October), and on 28 October the First and Third field armies united in liberated Skopje after defeating the Ottoman Vardar Army at Kumanovo. The Morava II troops were directed to Tetovo and set out on 30 October, and entered an empty town. On 31 October the Morava II Division was detached from the Third Army (which was mostly back in Kosovo) and put under the High Command, which gave Nedić considerable operative independence. Gostivar was taken without a fight that same day. The 2nd Battalion of the regiment with a machine gun and cavalry platoon was set up to protect the road from Debar. The Morava II Division next fought at Kičevo on 3–4 November, with the regiment being part of the second echelon that forced the Ottoman troops to retreat.

Next came the Battle of Bitola (16–19 November 1912). Due to weak communications and the situation on the field, Morava II commander Milovan Nedić chose to move towards Gopeš instead of Murgaš, and on 14–15 November continued the advance to Bitola in the heavy rain which flooded Crna River and Šemnica. On 16 October the 2nd Infantry Regiment of 2nd Call fought a tough battle and managed to take over the Oblakovo height and repelled a counter-attack. The situation was bad, as the regiment slept in the open, without food, water and adequate clothing. Nedić canceled the return of the 2nd Supernumerary Regiment back to the Morava Brigade bound for Gostivar, and also asked to have one Morava I regiment to support them, due to this. The First Army Command ordered for attack on Bitola on 17 October, however, the 2nd Infantry Regiment of 2nd Call and 3rd Regiment of 1st Call fought a bitter defensive battle on Oblakovo height throughout the day and night of 17–18 November. The Ottomans sought to retake Oblakovo as it would improve the situation of the Bitola garrison and open the way for a retreat to Resen. The Morava II Division fought a harder fight in the day of 18 November, and despite a strong stand, the troops defending the Đavato Pass left it which paved the way for an Ottoman retreat to Resen. At Oblakovo, the 2nd Infantry Regiment of 2nd Call, 3rd Infantry Regiment of 2nd Call, and 3rd Regiment of 1st Call, withstood all Ottoman attacks. The 2nd Infantry Regiment of 2nd Call pushed deep and seized key positions which put a wedge in Ottoman decisions. The Ottoman army began the retreat to Florina and Korça, as the Đavato Pass was retaken by Serbian troops.

After the victory at Bitola, the Morava II Division was tasked with securing the area towards Debar, to push out enemy troops from Crni Drim and Shkumbin. The 2nd Infantry Regiment of 2nd Call was tasked on 24 November with staying in Resen and controlling the area towards Korçë. On 30 November the regiment relocated to Ohrid, where it stayed until 6 December when it started moving cross Kičevo and Gostivar towards Tetovo. On 3rd December a truce was signed with the Porte. In the coming weeks, there were shootouts with armed Albanian bands. On 31 January 1913 the truce stopped and conflict continued, with the Morava II Division not being engaged. The Morava II Division participated in six battles and one great battle of the First Balkan War, and in 51 days moved 585 kilometres.

== Second Balkan War ==
The 2nd Call regiments were filled to full personnel and armed and equipped in par with the 1st Call regiments following the end of fighting in the First War. With the deteriorating of relations with Bulgaria, the Serbian soldiers that liberated Kosovo and Macedonia saw very negatively on the Bulgarian intentions to deny the Serbian warfare results, and thus, they held high morale and were ready and motivated to fight against Bulgaria in the Second Balkan War.

The Morava II Division was reorganized into the First Field Army, alongside the Šumadija I, Dunav I, Dunav II and Cavalry Division. The regimental commander was still Dušan Vasić, now elevated to lieutenant. Morava II was stationed near Skopje until late May 1913, when it was dispatched to Kumanovo. The 4th Supernumerary Regiment and a Dunav cavalry regiment reinforced the Morava II Division. The 2nd Infantry Regiment of 2nd Call was deployed on the right riverbanks of Zletovska where it was attacked by Bulgarian troops on the night of 29–30 June, marking the start of the Battle of Bregalnica. Despite being in the deployment phase, the present Morava II units resisted the Bulgarian advance, with the 2nd Battalion commanded by captain Miroslav Piletić holding the Lesnovo Monastery distinguishing itself, cooperating with the Dunav cavalry regiment. Serbian troops counter-attacked on 1–4 July and seized Retke Bukve and Rajčanski Rid and pursued the defeated Bulgarian troops, with the regiment supporting the 1st Regiment of 2nd Call and 7th Regiment of 1st Call. Serbian troops advanced and captured Kočani by 6 July, at which time cholera spread from the Bulgarian ranks into the Serbian. Between 7–10 July the Morava II forces in Pljačkavica mountain assisted the Third Field Army in attacking Bulgarian positions near Štip. Cholera spread further, and the Serbian offensive on Carevo Selo (now Delčevo) continued on 17 July. There were heavy fighting between 18–30 July, until an armistice was concluded on 31 July. The regiment suffered heavy losses in the last weeks, particularly at Crni Kamen and Grleno height, and the Morava II Division was reduced by more than half due to mostly wounded and cholera. Peace was finally signed on 9 August 1913, after which demobilization commenced, and the regiment was the last to leave the Kalimanci position, arriving at Niš on 5 September and Prokuplje on 7 September, where it was demobilized the next day.

== World War I ==
After the assassination of Franz Ferdinand on 28 June 1914, Austria-Hungary gave the Ultimatum to Serbia, which was totally unacceptable as it stripped the country of sovereignty, and war came next. On 25 July the mobilization was made official. Dušan Vasić continued as the regimental commander. The 1st and 2nd regiments of both calls were mobilized in Niš. The Morava II units were in early August stationed around Topola and organized into the First Field Army. The commander of Morava II was Ljubomir Milić, the previous commander Milovan Nedić having died from cholera on 10 August 1913.

== Legacy ==
Although it was a 2nd Call-regiment, sidelined and ill-equipped in the Balkan Wars, it demonstrated combat capability on par with 1st Call-regiments. It was renowned for its participation at Bregalnica.

== Composition ==
The Morava II Division (to which the regiment belonged) was organized into the Third Field Army in the First Balkan War and the First Field Army in the Second Balkan War. In World War I, the Morava II units were organized into the First Field Army.

- 2nd Infantry Regiment of 2nd Call, under sub-lieutenant Dušan Vasić in the Balkan Wars, and 1914.
  - 1st Battalion, under major Nikola Maksimović in World War I.
  - 2nd Battalion, under kapetan Miroslav Piletić in the Balkan Wars, major Petar Đorđević in World War I.
  - 3rd Battalion, under major Nikola Marković in World War I.
  - 4th Battalion, under major Milorad Nedić.

== See also ==
- First Balkan War order of battle: Serbian Army
- Structure of the Serbian Army during World War I
- Iron Regiment

== Sources ==
- Dinčić, Aleksandar; Trajković, Veroljub (2018). ВЕЛИКИ РАТ СВЕСКА II: МОРАВСКА ДИВИЗИЈА У ПРВОМ СВЕТСКОМ РАТУ 1914-1918. Narodni muzej Leskovac.
- Lekić, Dragan R., ed. (2014). Други пешадијски пук „Књаз Михаило“–Гвоздени пук у Ослободилачким ратовима 1912–1918. године. Историјски архив Топлице - Прокупље.
  - Tasić, Dmitar (2014). "ДРУГИ ПЕШАДИЈСКИ ПУК ДРУГОГ ПОЗИВА У БАЛКАНСКИМ РАТОВИМА 1912-1913 [Second Infantry Regiment of Second Call in the Balkan Wars 1912-1913]". In Lekić, Dragan R. (ed.). Други пешадијски пук „Књаз Михаило “–Гвоздени пук у Ослободилачким ратовима 1912–1918. године. Историјски архив Топлице - Прокупље. pp. 59-.
