= Murgah =

Murgah (Persian: مورگاه) may refer to:

- Murgah, Sepidan, Fars Province
- Murgah Kakan, Kohgiluyeh and Boyer-Ahmad Province
