= Church of the Holy Salvation =

Church of Holy Salvation may stand for:

- Church of Holy Salvation, Cetina
- Church of Holy Salvation, Prizren
- Church of Holy Salvation, Skopje, an Orthodox church in Skopje, Republic of North Macedonia
