= Battle of Monastir =

Battle during the First Balkan War

- Part of First Balkan War
- Map of the battle
Date	16–19 November 1912
Location	Manastir Vilayet, Ottoman Empire (present day: Near Bitola, North Macedonia) 41.032799°N 21.34029°E
Result	Serbian victory

Belligerents
Kingdom of Serbia	Ottoman Empire

Commanders and leaders
Petar Bojović; Ilija Gojković; Ivan S. Pavlović	Zeki Pasha; Fethi Pasha †; Cevat Pasha

Units involved
First Army (Morava I, Morava II, Drina I, Dunav I, Timok II, Cavalry Division)	Vardar Army

Strength
108,544	38,350

Casualties and losses
2,660 casualties; 539 killed; 2,121 wounded	11,200 casualties; 3,000 killed and wounded; 3,200 captured; 5,000 deserted

The Battle of Monastir (Serbian: Битољска битка) took place near the town of Monastir (now Bitola) in the Macedonia region (the then capital of the Manastir vilayet) during the First Balkan War, between Serbian and Ottoman forces, from 16 to 19 November 1912. It resulted in a Serbian victory after heavy fighting north of the city, the routed Ottomans fled abandoning their guns.

== Background and prelude ==
The Bitola operation of the First Army, with the goal to liberate Macedonia, took 24 days. The first stage of the operation was completed through the destruction of the Ottoman 5th Corps, in which the 2nd Infantry Regiment had a crucial role in, at Babuna. The Ottoman Command's choice of mustering at Bitola was logical and ideal as in this time of the year, in mid-November, it was exceptionally favourable defensive terrain. Serbian forces were only able to approach on one road leading to Bitola, and the Serbian artillery was unable to accompany them as the terrain was snowy and flooded. Meanwhile, after seizing Skopje, the Serbian Command sent forces to help their Bulgarian ally besiege Adrianople.

The Bitola operation included battalions of mainly the Morava I and Morava II, but also parts of Drina I, Dunav I, Timok II, and the Cavalry Division. On the morning of November 16, the commander of the 1st Army gave the order to attack. Morava II was directed in the Oblakovo—Kiromarica—Brusnik line; Morava I in Sekirani—Snegevo—Bitola—Bukovo; Drina I in Kukurečani—Krklino—Raštani—Krstaor; Dunav I in Trn—Karamani—Poeševo; Timok II was kept in the army reserve near the Prilep road near Topolčani and Klepače; The Cavalry Division was given the general task of operating in the flank and rear of the Ottoman army.

According to Ivan S. Pavlović (1921), the Ottoman army at Bitola numbered over 20,000 under Cevat Pasha and c. 11,000 under Fethi Pasha.

== Order of battle ==
Serbian infantrymen in a field outside Bitola.

Serbian

- Morava I, under Ilija Gojković.
  - 2nd Infantry Regiment of 1st Call, under potpukovnik Vladimir Ristić.
    - 2nd Battalion, under major Jovan Naumović.
  - 3rd Infantry Regiment of 1st Call, under Ivan S. Pavlović.
    - 1st Battalion of the 3rd Infantry Regiment, under major Tihomir Smiljković.
    - Battalion of the 3rd Infantry Regiment, under major Dobroslav Đorić.
- Morava II, under pukovnik Milovan Nedić.
  - 2nd Infantry Regiment of 2nd Call, under potpukovnik Dušan Vasić.
    - Three battalions, one was detached and used in other front.
  - 3rd Infantry Regiment of 2nd Call, under potpukovnik Milutin Stefanović.
    - Battalion, under major Kosta Mihajlović-Rus.
- Drina I
  - 6th Infantry Regiment of 1st Call, under potpukovnik Đura Dokić.
  - 17th Infantry Regiment of 1st Call, under potpukovnik Miladin Masalović.
- Cavalry Division, under Arsen Karađorđević.

Ivan S. Pavlović, the commander of the 3rd Infantry Regiment of 1st Call, also received the command of the 2nd Infantry Regiment of 2nd Call, as well as three battalions of the 3rd Infantry Regiment of 2nd Call, to operate as one detachment (he was "Detachment Commander", komandant odreda).

Ottoman

On November 16, 1912, the Ottoman army at Bitola was structured as follows:

- Vardar Army HQ (Serbian Front, Monastir)
  - Left Flank Offensive Corps
    - VI Corps
      - 16th Division
      - 19th Division
      - Fethi Bey Detachment
      - Independent Cavalry Brigade
  - Right Flank Defensive Corps
    - VII Corps
      - İştip Redif Division
    - V Corps
      - 13th Division
      - 15th Division
      - 18th Division

== Battle ==
=== Oblakovo and Đavato ===
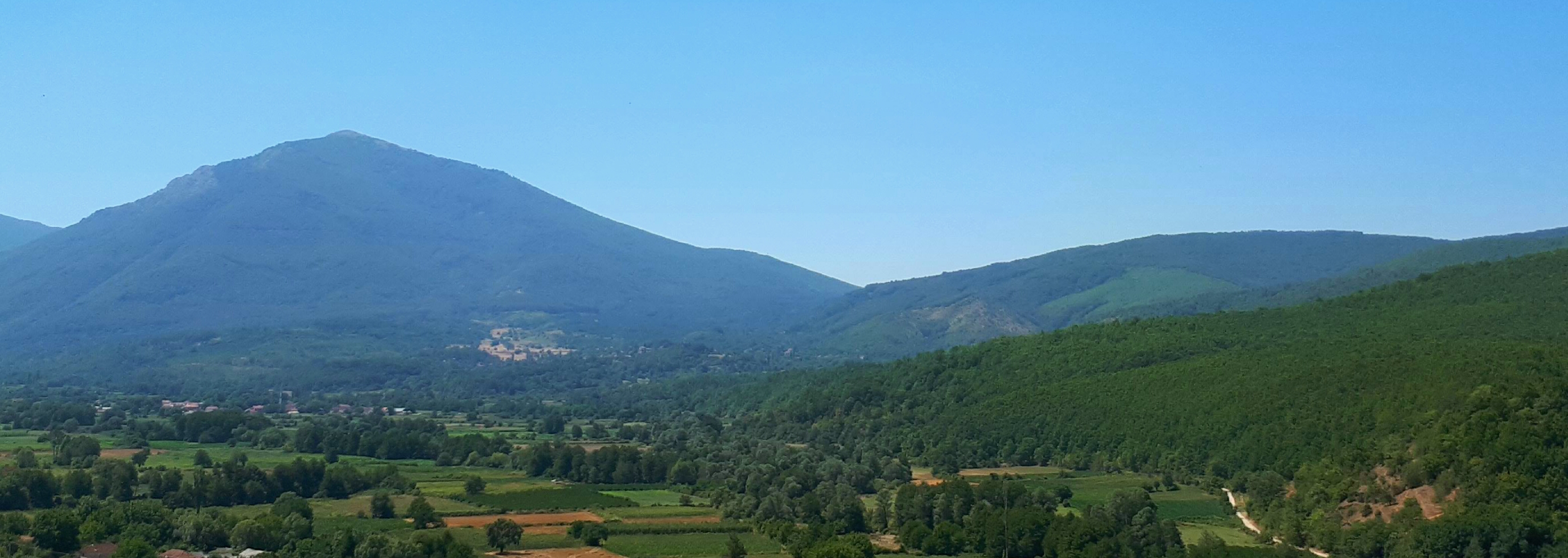
View of Đavato.

Due to weak communications and the situation on the field, Morava II commander Milovan Nedić chose to move towards Gopeš instead of Murgaševo (Demir Hisar), and on 14–15 November continued the advance to Bitola in the heavy rain which flooded Crna River and Šemnica. On 16 October the 2nd Infantry Regiment of 2nd Call fought a tough battle and managed to take over the Oblakovo height and repelled a counter-attack. The situation was bad, as the regiment slept in the open, without food, water and adequate clothing. Nedić canceled the return of the 2nd Supernumerary Regiment back to the Morava Brigade bound for Gostivar, and also asked to have one Morava I regiment to support them, due to this. The First Army Command ordered for attack on Bitola on 17 October, however, the 2nd Infantry Regiment of 2nd Call and 3rd Regiment of 1st Call fought a bitter defensive battle on Oblakovo height throughout the day and night of 17–18 November. The Ottomans sought to retake Oblakovo as it would improve the situation of the Bitola garrison and open the way for a retreat to Resen. The Morava II Division fought a harder fight in the day of 18 November, and despite a strong stand, the troops defending the Đavato Pass left it which paved the way for an Ottoman retreat to Resen. At Oblakovo, the 2nd Infantry Regiment of 2nd Call, 3rd Infantry Regiment of 2nd Call, and 3rd Regiment of 1st Call, withstood all Ottoman attacks. The 2nd Infantry Regiment of 2nd Call pushed deep and seized key positions which put a wedge in Ottoman decisions. The Ottoman army began the retreat to Florina and Korça, as the Đavato Pass was retaken by Serbian troops.

=== Beli Kamen and Drevenik ===
The Morava II right column attacked the Ottoman position on Gopeš on 16 November [O.S. 3 November] 1912, a day before the planned start. A smaller detachment attacked from the front while the larger part flanked, threatening with encirclement. In the evening, the right flank took control of the Gavato pass which cut off the Ottoman retreat to Resen and Ohrid. Meanwhile, the left column (made up of the Morava I 2nd Infantry Regiment) lodged north of Beli Kamen, which they then took. The Ottoman flank retreated to the southern plateau where it was reinforced with the 16th and 6th Corps. One battalion of the 2nd Infantry Regiment fortified Beli Kamen, while the rest were sent to attack, encountering strong resistance from the Ottoman 16th Division that led to defensive measures. Morava II was unable to take advantage of the successes as its front was 16km wide with stronger Ottoman troops (the Vardar Army reserve), and its request for aid by Morava I came late due to weak communication.

The Morava I and Drina I battalions in two echelons charged the slopes of Drevenik (mountain), but their artillery was left in the plain by the Prilep road due to the mountainous terrain, and thus were impossible to aid in the attack. The troops that approached the Šemnica river fell under machine gun fire and the flooded river prevented movement. Two batteries of Morava II opened fire from the road near Beli Kamen and neutralized the Ottoman artillery near Gabalavci and Sekirani, while one cannon of Drina I, lowered by ropes near Lisolaj, neutralized the Ottoman battery in Dragožani. Immediately afterwards, the first echelon began wading Šemnica. Due to the lateral movement of the Ottoman artillery from Kukurečani, Serbian troops repositioned to the right, with Morava I battalions entering the zone of Morava II, and Drina I moving into the zone of Morava I. After crossing Šemnica, close combat developed and by nightfall the troops broke out on the Gabalavci—Sekirani—Dragožani line. The Ottomans retreated to the mountainous part of the position of Kiromarica—Kočište. During the night, both Serbian divisions were moving their other echelons over Šemnica and preparing to extend the attack.

On the third day, one Serbian regiment attack Ottoman positions near Beli Kamen but was repulsed with heavy losses, after which the Ottoman army made a general attack on the Morava II troops. The Morava II right column was fired on from two sides, from Prevalec and Resen, and throughout the day regrouped to repel attacks, while its left column was the focus of the general attack which led to close fighting in dense fog. The Ottoman charges were repelled with blind fire from parapets. Morava II commander Milovan Nedić and Morava I commander Ilija Gojković were present; Gojković called on a third regiment from the reserve to aid at Beli Kamen, making the total of Serbian regiments present at Beli Kamen five.

=== Trn and Karamani ===
The Dunav I troops present were ordered to attack in two columns; the right crossed the bridges on the Crna River and Šemnica and attacked the village of Trn and broke the front of the Ottoman 5th Corps after trampling marshes up to the waist. The troops did not notice the breakthrough which gave the Ottoman troops the opportunity to reassemble at Karamani. The left, main column, was sent to attack the Ottoman right flank, but was unable to cross the 2m deep river and swamps as the bridge over Crna River had been destroyed, so it stayed back at the village of Novaci.

After the success of the Drina troops at Kočište and Kiromarica, the Dunav I troops with artillery support captured Karamani at 18:00 on 18 November.

=== Serbian cavalry ===
The Brod crossing over Crna River.

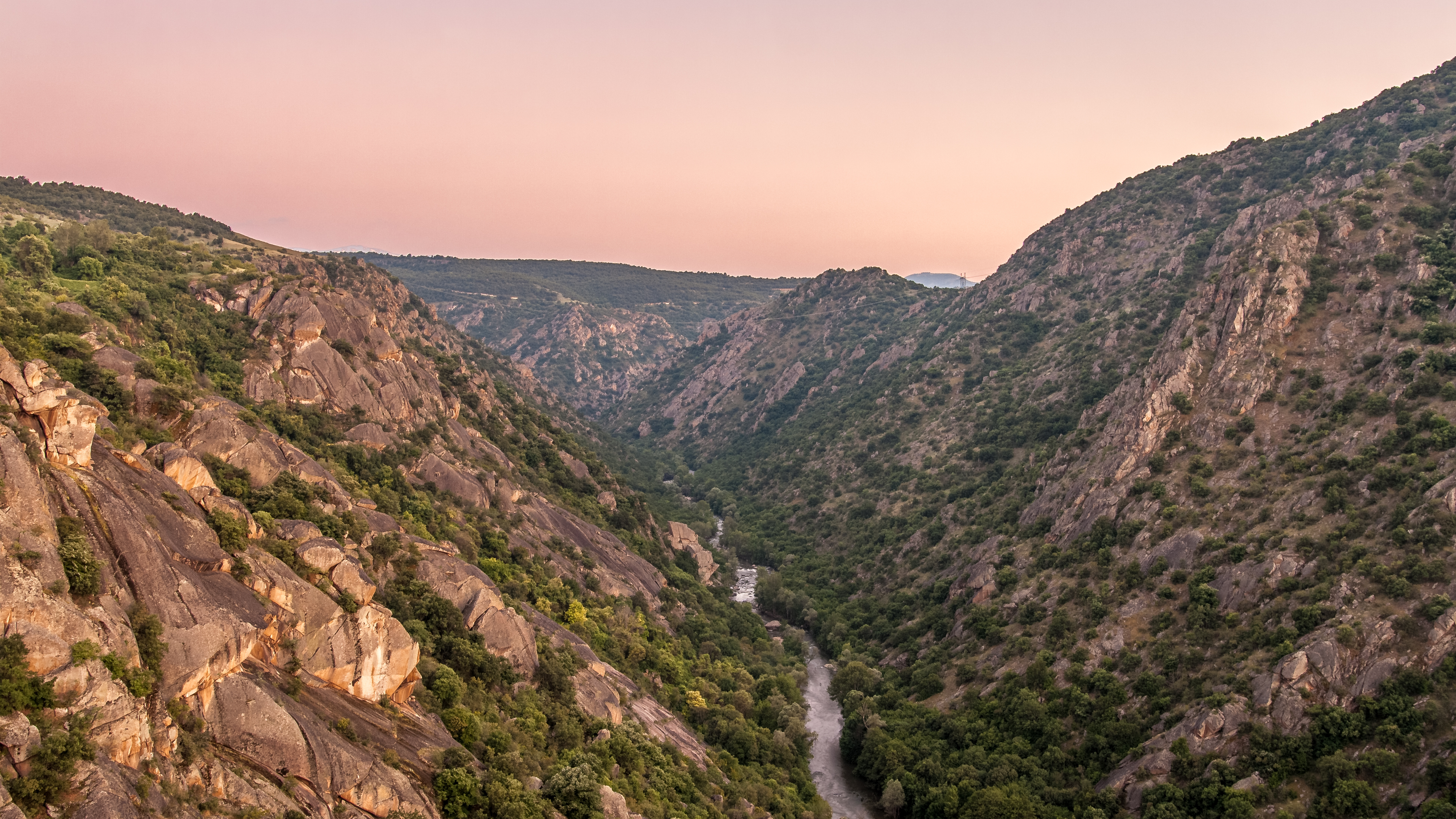
Skočivir canyon.

The Cavalry Division had no clearly defined task, and one regiment was sent to Brod to take control of Crna Reka crossings, while the majority set off only in the afternoon and spent the night at Biljanik. The regiment captured the undamaged bridges near Brod and Skočivir and crossed to the right bank of Crna, where it was attacked by Ottoman irregulars and was forced to retreat. The regiment destroyed both bridges, which unfortunately had detrimental consequences for the further work of the division in the operation.

On 18 November, the Cavalry Division moved from Biljanik towards Brod, from where it drove out the Ottoman troops with artillery fire and then had the river bridge repaired. Two regiments were transferred over the bridge on the night of 18/19 November.

=== Serbian artillery ===
Almost all of the divisional artillery was concentrated on the Beranci–Vašarejca road, secured by the Timok II 14th Infantry Regiment (the rest of the Timok II was in reserve). On 18 November, Timok II used artillery fire and before dark saw how Ottoman columns retreated, then had one of its regiments transferred over Šemnica.

=== Šemnica and Sekirani ===
Ottoman forces were set up at the many mountains and heights around Bitola, and their artillery bombarded the road, which forced some of the Serbian troops to cross at Šemnica. The 2nd Infantry Regiment managed dragging out the 7th Battery of the Morava Artillery Regiment (one of 9 in total in the Morava Division) under the command of Dragutin Krstić to the position. A recon unit liquidated Ottoman outposts on the left riverbank, after which a charge on the Ottoman forces by the river and in the trenches 500m further in was planned. On the night of 17 November the 2nd Infantry Regiment charged the icy river while the battery was in a duel with Ottoman artillery (which greatly outnumbered the four Serbian guns) and machine gun fire engulfed the river. French journalist Henri Barbusse wrote of the charge on the river:

Fully uniformed, in the dead of winter, and under a hail of bullets and shrapnel, Serbian soldiers entered the icy water—clasping hands to withstand the force of the current—ducking down and rising back up whenever a shell whistled overhead. The exceptionally high death toll in this battle is due to the fact that most of the wounded—even those with only minor injuries—perished by drowning, tossed about by waves that reached as high as their chests.

The 2nd and 3rd Battalions of the 2nd Infantry Regiment, followed by the 17th Regiment of the Drina Division, approached the firm Ottoman positions 1km from the river. Another charge led to the 2nd and 3rd Battalions of the 2nd Infantry Regiment managing some 400m from Ottoman positions. Seeing that the 2,000 men laid in the mud under constant fire, regimental major Naumović ordered the battalion trumpeter to signal for assault, which "electrified" the men, who entered Sekirani with bombs and close combat and dispersed the 52nd and 57th Ottoman regiments. The battalions managed to position themselves 700m from the Ottoman 7th Corps under Fethi Pasha based in Kočište. The charge, which was 17 hours of ceaseless battle, without food or rest, left many Serbian casualties but was a huge success. After a thick fog in the morning of 18 November, the 2nd and 3rd battalions in the enemy territory saw that they were in a very bad position, about to be encircled, but a successful charge into the Ottoman trenches led to the Ottoman camp to retreat to Resen, with their dead commander Fethi Pasha, thereby opening the road for the Serbian army to Bitola.

=== Kočište and Kiromarica ===
The Drina troops with one Morava I regiment launched an attack from the slopes of Kočište and Kiromarica. The Drina 6th Infantry Regiment entered Kiromarica unnoticed in the fog, and around noon with the fog gone entered heavy shooting with Ottoman troops. The Drina 17th Infantry Regiment then immediately took control of Kočište, while the rest of the regiments fought heavily near Kukurečani–Krklino. The front of the Ottoman Vardar Army was broken through 5km wide, but this was not realized and the fog fell once again, after which the regiments fortified themselves instead of pursuing and cutting the Ottoman Bitola–Resen communication.

=== End ===
Captured Ottoman Albanian prisoners of war after the battle.

After the fall of Kočište and Kiromarica, and failure of Cevat Pasha at Beli Kamen on 18 November, Zeki Pasha ordered for parts of the army to retreat: 5th and half of 7th Corps to Florina, 6th and half of 7th Corps to Resen and Korça. Cevat ceased attacks on Beli Kamen and managed to pull out his troops in the dense fog unnoticed. As Gavato was cut off, Cevat redirected stronger forces there and launched a heavy attack before dark, forcing the weak Morava II right column there to retreat 1km north. The Ottoman troops now had the way to Ohrid opened, which the 6th and part of 7th Corps retreated through during the night. On 19 November, Serbian troops recaptured Gavato and took 2,000 Ottoman soldiers as prisoners of war. The Vardar right wing retreated towards Florina. On 19 November the Drina I troops first entered Bitola, while the Cavalry Division crossed Brod and pursued the Ottoman troops, then on 20 November cut of the Bitola–Florina railway. A Serbian cavalry squadron entered Florina and met up with the Greek Army. Most of the Serbian troops remained at Bitola, with only the Morava II troops sent to pursuit Ottoman troops to Ohrid.

The Serbian army captured 3,200 enemy soldiers and 57 artillery guns. According to Stanisavljević (1952), the Ottoman army had at least 9,600 killed and wounded. The Serbian troops had 3,230 dead and wounded. Pavlović's detachment had 1,000 killed and wounded, out of which the 3rd Infantry Regiment of 1st Call had 306 casualties. The 2nd Infantry Regiment of 1st Call had 61 dead and 239 wounded.

== Aftermath and legacy ==
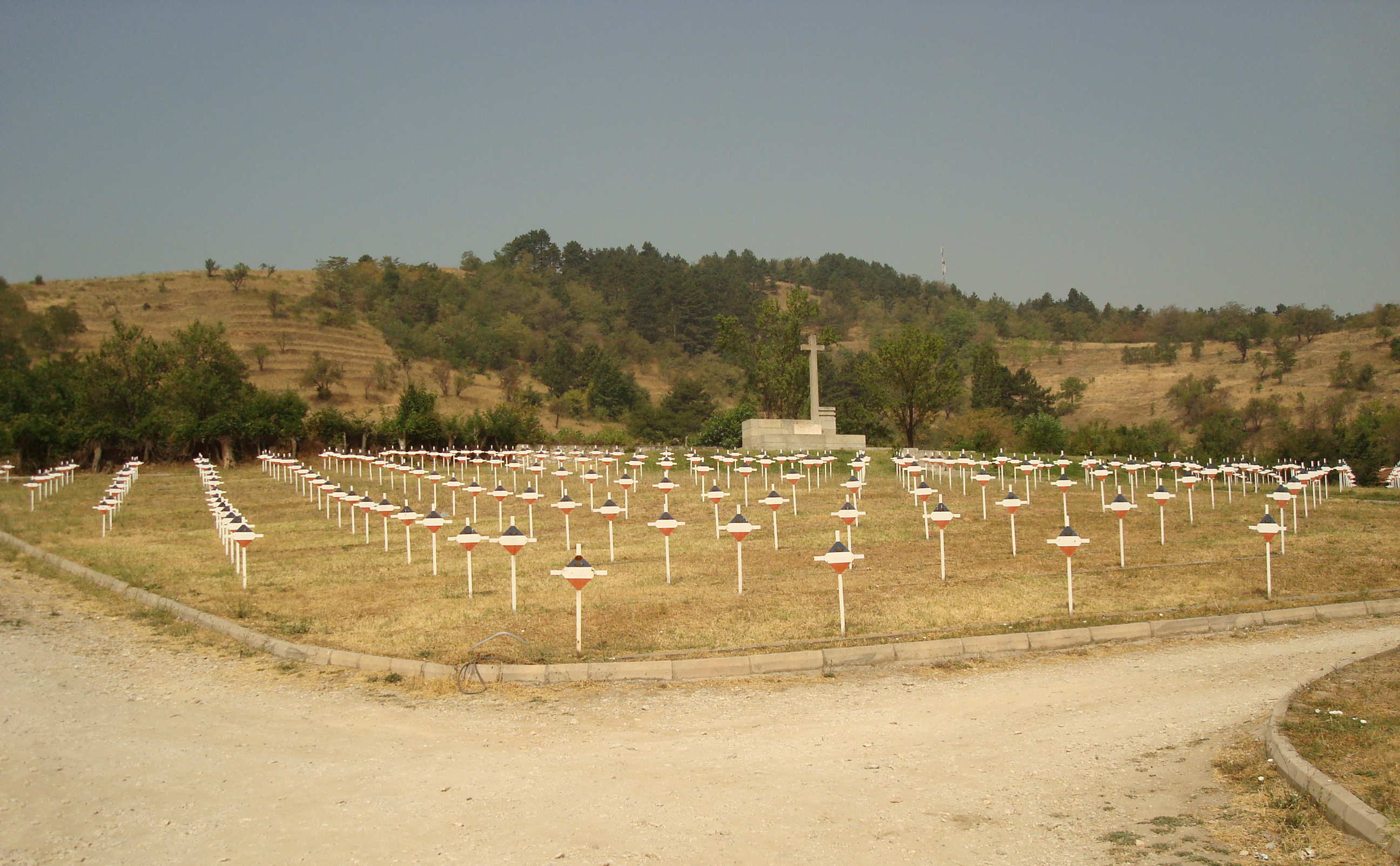
Serbian military cemetery in Bitola.

The victory at Kumanovo meant the removal of offensive power of the Ottoman Vardar Army, while the victory near Bitola meant the end of the Vardar Army as an organized structure. Thus, the Ottoman war machinery against Serbia was destroyed. Kosovo and North Macedonia were liberated from the Ottoman Empire.

The Serbian 1st Army continued fighting in the First Balkan War. At this point some officers wanted the 1st Army to continue its advance down the valley of the Vardar to Thessaloniki. Vojvoda Putnik refused. The threat of war with Austria-Hungary loomed over the issue of a Serbian presence on the Adriatic. In addition, with the Bulgarians and Greeks already in Thessaloniki, the appearance of Serbian forces there would only muddle an already complicated situation.

== See also ==
- Monastir Offensive (1916)

== Sources ==
- Hall, Richard C. (2000). The Balkan Wars, 1912–1913: Prelude to the First World War. Routledge.
- Kostić, Radoje (2014). "ДРУГИ ПЕШАДИЈСКИ ПУК 1. ПОЗИВА „КЊАЗ МИХАИЛО" У БИЦИ ЗА БИТОЉ 16-19. НОВЕМБРА 1912". In Lekić, Dragan R. (ed.). Други пешадијски пук "Књаз Михаило "–Гвоздени пук у Ослободилачким ратовима 1912–1918. године. Историјски архив Топлице - Прокупље. pp. 49–.
- Pavlović, Ivan S. (1922) [1921]. У Битољској битци изнад Облакова [In the Battle of Bitola above Oblakovo] (PDF). Gece Kona.
- Stanisavljević, Živko (1952). Битољска операција 1912 [Bitola Operation 1912]. Београд.
- Stojančević, Vladimir (2007). Први балкански рат 1912. године и крај Османског царства на Балкану: зборник радова са научног скупа одржаног 27. и 28. новембра 2002. године. Српска академија наука и уметности. ISBN 978-86-7025-436-7.
- Tasić, Dmitar (2014). "ДРУГИ ПЕШАДИЈСКИ ПУК ДРУГОГ ПОЗИВА У БАЛКАНСКИМ РАТОВИМА 1912-1913 [Second Infantry Regiment of Second Call in the Balkan Wars 1912-1913]". In Lekić, Dragan R. (ed.). Други пешадијски пук "Књаз Михаило "–Гвоздени пук у Ослободилачким ратовима 1912–1918. године. Историјски архив Топлице - Прокупље. pp. 59–.
