= Gradishte (archaeological site) =

Gradishte is an archaeological site in North Macedonia, located near the modern day village of Crnobuki. The site may be synonymous with Lyncus, the capital of ancient Lyncestis. Evidence of occupation persists up until the year 700.

== History of excavations ==
The site has been known since at least the 1960s. It was initially thought to be a military outpost, and was dated to the time of Philip V of Macedon. However, more excavations and Lidar scans pushed the date back a century earlier during the time of Alexander the Great, and also revealed that it was much larger than previously thought. Further artefacts found have suggested that it dates back to the Bronze Age. Later in 2025, it was reported that a large residence had been uncovered atop the city's hill.
