= Crnobuki =

Crnobuki Црнобуки
- Village
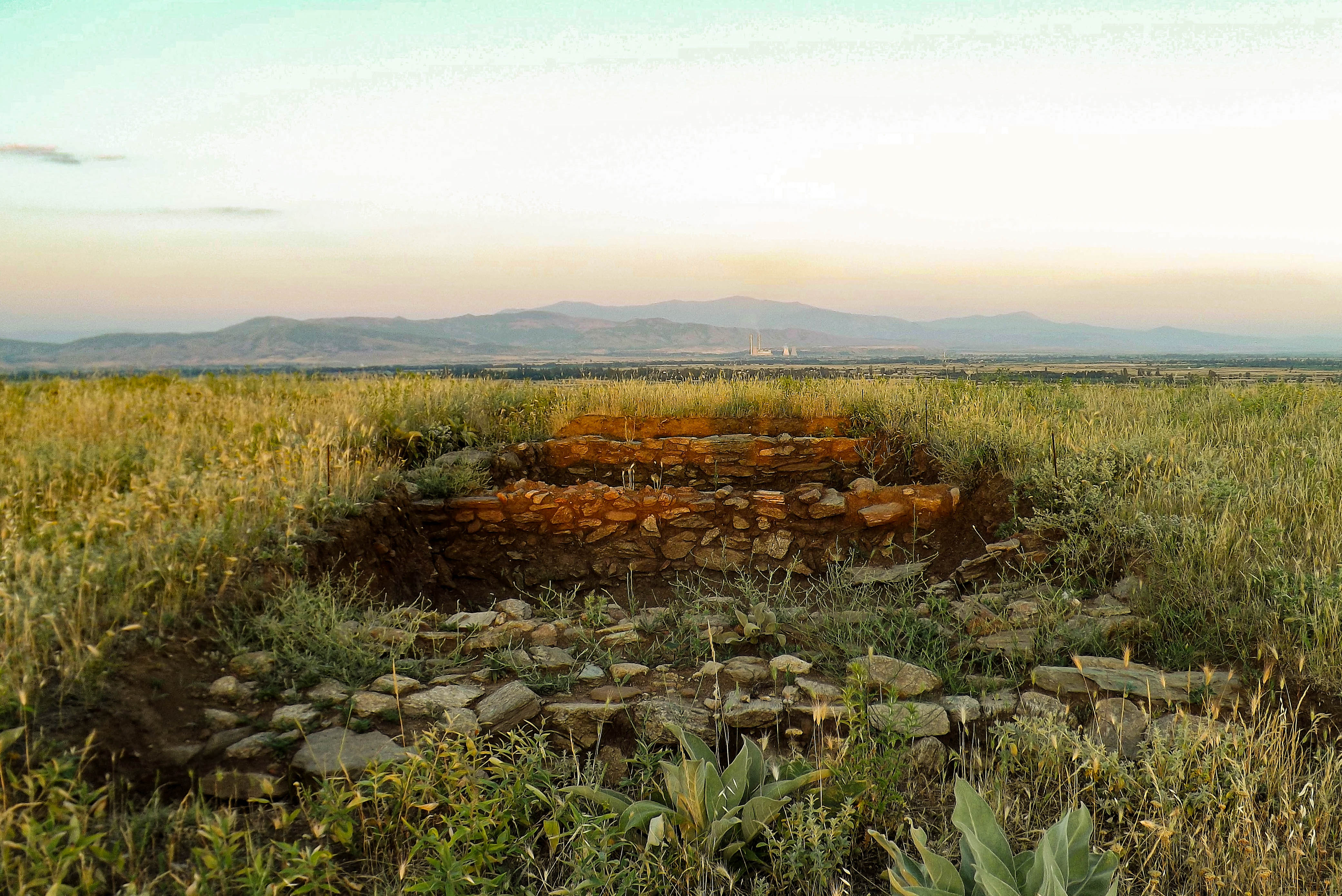
- Ruins above Crnobuki in 2012

- Location within North Macedonia
- Coordinates: 41°7′19.19″N 21°19′23.43″E
- Country: North Macedonia
- Region: Pelagonia
- Municipality: Bitola

Population (2002)
  - Total: 406
- Time zone: UTC+1 (CET)
  - Summer (DST): UTC+2 (CEST)

Crnobuki (Црнобуки) is a village in the Bitola Municipality of North Macedonia.

== History ==
Excavations in 2025 at the Gradishte site led archaeologists to conclude that ruins near Crnobuki may be the ancient city of Lyncus. The work was conducted by California State Polytechnic University, Humboldt and the Bitola Institute and Museum. Lyncus was the capital of Lyncestis, inhabited in the 7th century BC, and was the birthplace of Eurydice I.

Crnobuki is not attested in the Ottoman 1467–1468 defter (tax registry) of the vilayet of Manastir, nor the 1568–1569 defter. It is mentioned as Crno Buki in an Ottoman document written some time in 1650–1750. It is possible that the village dates to the 18th century, as the oldest known families settled here in that time. According to Qemal Murati (2022), there were some heads of households in the village that were of Albanian origin some time in the 15th–16th centuries, though no defter is referenced.

== Demographics ==
According to the 2002 census, it had a population of 406, all Macedonians.

== Sports ==
The local football club FK Crno Buki ZL plays in the Macedonian Third Football League.

== Sources ==
- Stojanovski, Aleksandar (1971). Турски документи за историјата на македонскиот народ: Опширен пописен дефтер бр. 4 : (1467-1468 година). архив на Македонија.
- Stojanovski, Aleksandar (2008). Турски документи за историјата на македонскиот народ: Опширен пописен дефтер 1568-69 година. архив на Македонија.
- Trifunoski, Jovan F. (1998). Битољско-Прилепска котлина: антропогеографска проучавања (1914-1997). Српска академија наука и уметности.
