= Dolno Srpci =

Dolno Srpci Долно Српци
- village
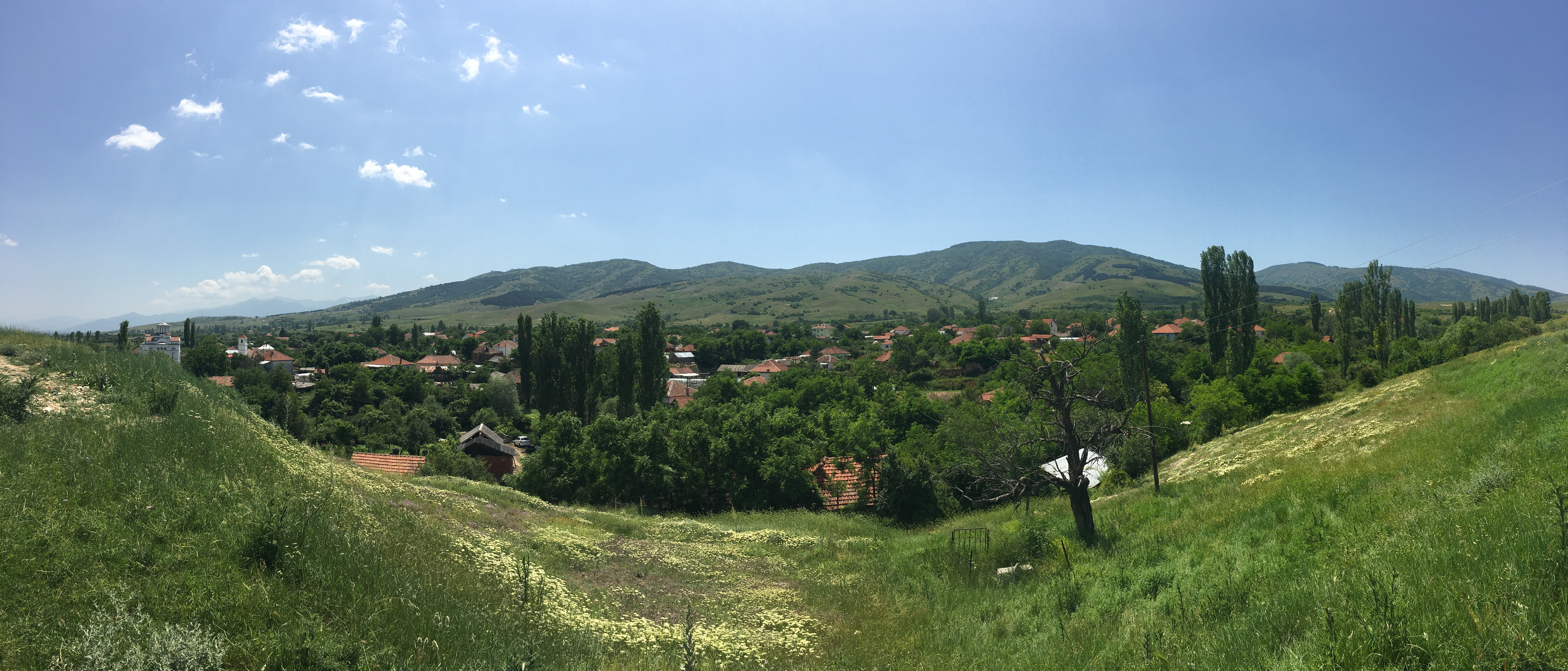
- Panoramic view of the village

- Location within North Macedonia
- Coordinates: 41°10′33″N 21°21′48″E
- Country: North Macedonia
- Region: Pelagonia
- Municipality: Mogila
- Elevation: 593 m (1,946 ft)

Population (2002)
  - Total: 479
- Time zone: UTC+1 (CET)
  - Summer (DST): UTC+2 (CEST)
- Website: .

Dolno Srpci (Долно Српци) is a village in the municipality of Mogila, North Macedonia. It is located north-east of the city of Bitola in North Macedonia in the Pelagonia plain and is 593m above sea level.

== Description ==
Dolno Srpci (translation: lower Serbian village) is situated in the southern region of North Macedonia. Several major attractions are located outside the village surroundings, like Bitola (16 km), Prilep (24 km), Ohrid (47 km), Prespa National Park (50 km), and Mt. Pelister (30 km).

== Demographics ==
According to the 2002 census, the village had a total of 479 inhabitants. Ethnic groups in the village include:

- Macedonians 478
- Others 1

== Culture ==
There are two churches in the village: Sveti Todor (Theodore of Amasea) and Arhangel Mihail (Michael the Archangel). The village celebrates the feast days of Petrovden (St. Peter's day) and Sveti Todor. On these days, especially on Petrovden, Television Skopje travels from the country's capital to film footage of guest singers such as Tushe (Blagojche Stojanovski), Tatijana Lazerevska, Irena Spasovska, Sanja Risteska, Spasen Siljanovski and other well-known Macedonian singers.

In 2009, a song dedicated to the village called "Dolno Srpci, Selo Nashe" was written, with music by Ferus Mustafov and Goce Stoilkov. Lyrics were by Stefce Grujovski, Bruno Nedanovski and the song was performed by Blagojche Stojanovski, Tushe.

In 2016, October 17, A video clip for the song was filmed in the Village by INTV Productions.

== Economy ==
Dolno Srpci sells wheat and milk to the Ideal-Sipka Company in Bitola. Tobacco farming is practiced in the village, with some of the product being exported.
