= Romeo Murga =

Chilean poet, writer, and translator

Romeo Murga (1904–1925) was a Chilean poet, writer and translator.

He was born in Copiapó, on June 18 1904, and studied at the German High School. He moved to Santiago in March 1920 and studied teaching in French at the Pedagogical Institute of the University of Chile. He qualified as a French Teacher in 1924, and was appointed professor at the school in Quillota. His only published book was 'El Libro de la Fiesta' which contained his best known poem 'El Poema de la Fiesta.' Posthumously, 'El Canto de la Sombra' was published by his sister, Berta Murga, in 1946. It was republished in 1999 at the José Joaquín Vallejo auditorium hall in Copiapó.

Romeo Murga died in the town of San Bernardo on May 22, 1925 at the age of 21 of Tuberculosis.
