= Ivanjevci =

Ivanjevci Ивањевци
- Village
- Location within North Macedonia
- Coordinates: 41.208490°N 21.359290°E
- Country: North Macedonia
- Region: Pelagonia
- Municipality: Mogila

Population (2002)
  - Total: 615
- Time zone: UTC+1 (CET)
  - Summer (DST): UTC+2 (CEST)
- Website: .

Ivanjevci (Macedonian: Ивањевци) is a village in the municipality of Mogila, North Macedonia.

== Demographics ==
According to the 2002 census, the village had a total of 615 inhabitants. Ethnic groups in the village include:

- Macedonians 611
- Romani 3
- Others 1
