= Dobromiri =

Dobromiri Добромири
- Village
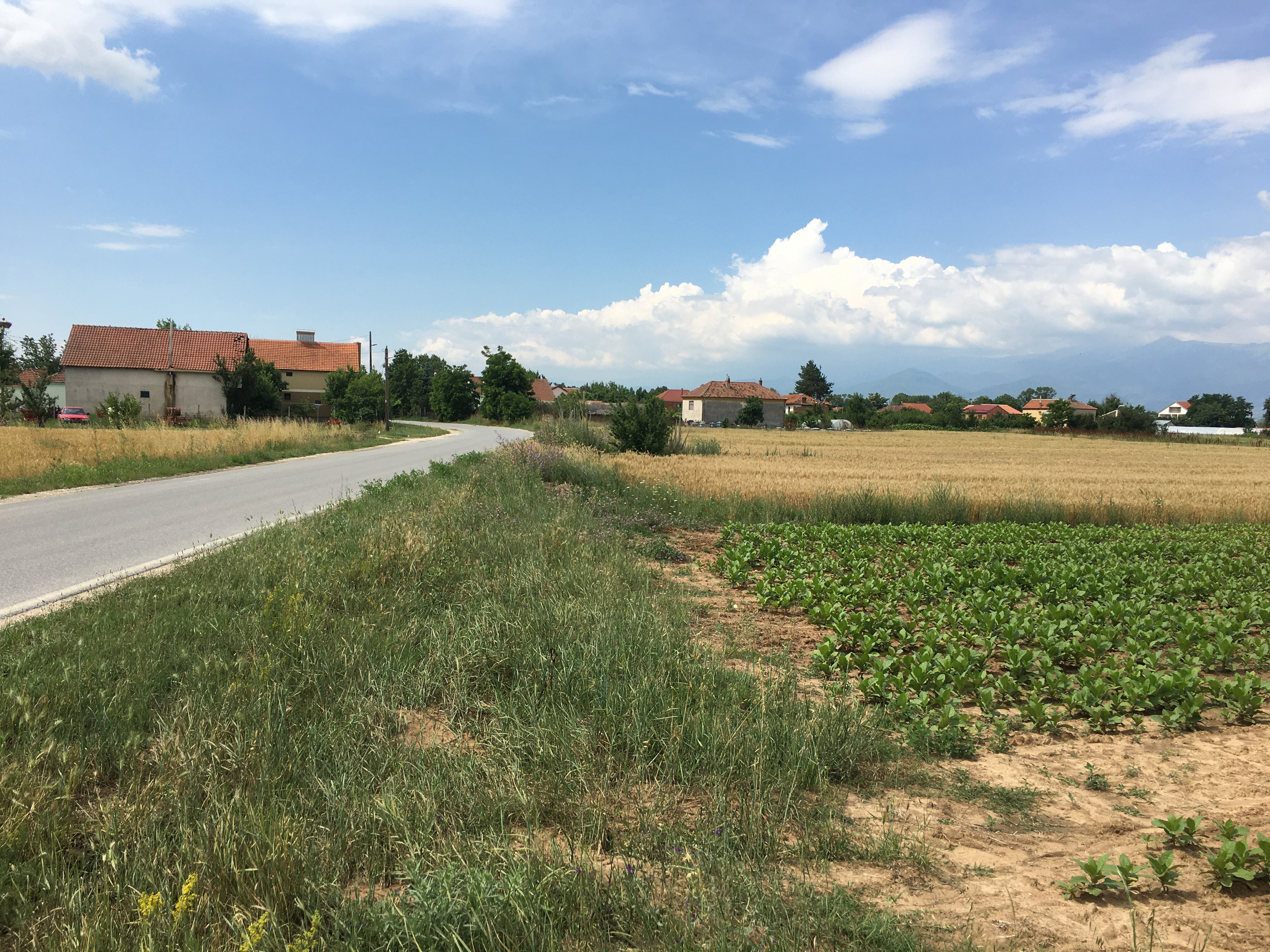
- View of the village

- Location within North Macedonia
- Coordinates: 41.068921°N 21.454390°E
- Country: North Macedonia
- Region: Pelagonia
- Municipality: Novaci

Population (2002)
  - Total: 345
- Time zone: UTC+1 (CET)
  - Summer (DST): UTC+2 (CEST)
- Car plates: BT
- Website: .

Dobromiri (Macedonian: Добромири) is a village in the municipality of Novaci, North Macedonia.

== Demographics ==
Dobromiri is attested in the Ottoman defter of 1467/68 as a village in the vilayet of Manastir. The majority of the inhabitants attested bore typical Slavic anthroponyms, with a small minority exhibiting Albanian anthroponyms such as Arbanash and Leko.

According to the 2002 census, the village had a total of 345 inhabitants. Ethnic groups in the village include:

- Macedonians 344
- Aromanians 1
