= Liberation of Skopje (1912) =

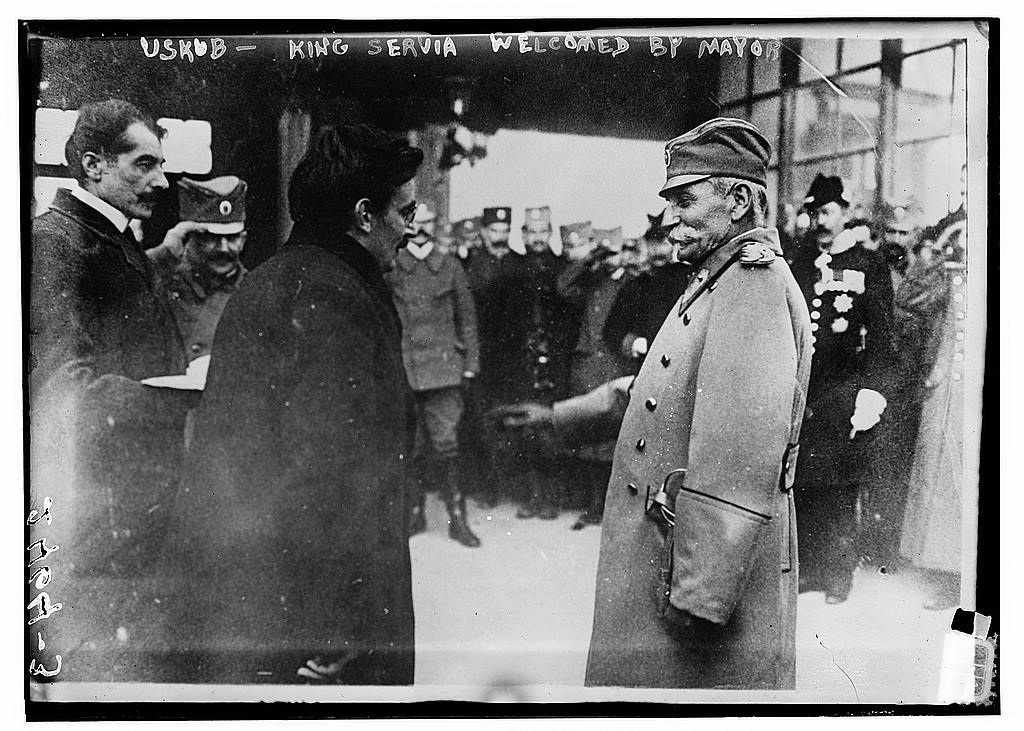
- King Peter welcomed by the newly-appointed mayor
- Planned by: Royal Serbian Army Command
- Objective: Capture of Üsküb (Skopje)
- Date: 26 October [O.S. 13 October] 1912
- Executed by: First Army

The Liberation of Skopje (Serbian: Ослобођење Скопља) came after the Serbian Army victory over the Ottoman Vardar Army at Kumanovo (23–24 October 1912) and the subsequent retreat of the Ottoman army from Üsküb (Skopje), during the First Balkan War.

The Serbian Army, which had a central role in the Balkan Alliance, very quickly advanced towards Skopje which was a strategical goal. Even after the end of the battle at Kumanovo, the Serbian First Army still believed that it had fought against weaker Ottoman units and that the main enemy forces were on to Ovče Pole. Although the Ottoman army had exceptional defensive positions at Skopje, following their defeat at Kumanovo, they retreated further, towards Prilep and Bitola. Skopje was taken without a fight, with Serbian troops entering the town on 26 October [O.S. 13 October] 1912. The liberation of Skopje was symbolical in that it was once a possession of Serbian emperor Stefan Dušan, due to which it was called Dušanov grad ("Dušan's City").

The crown prince Alexander triumphantly entered the city with the First Army, which he commanded. He wrote an official congratulation that same day to the First Army, and the king also telegrammed a congratulation from Vranje. On 1 November [O.S. 19 October] 1912, the city declared the holding of a sabor ("assembly"), reminiscent of the Serbian Empire. The assembly was to guest Serbian parliamentary members, as well as guests from allied Montenegro, Greece and Bulgaria.

The Serbian king Peter entered the city on 2 November [O.S. 15 October] 1912, arriving on train with prince Pavle, princess Jelena, Prime Minister Nikola Pašić and Assembly President Andra Nikolić. Peter was accompanied by vojvoda Radomir Putnik. The king was welcomed by the new mayor, Spiro Hadži Ristić who spoke of Old Serbia and its legacy of the Nemanjić dynasty. The old Ottoman municipal president, Reşat (Rašid-beg), also welcomed king Peter in the name of all Muslim citizens, and said "Five centuries have passed since the Ottomans seized this city from you by the sword. But the fortunes of war have turned in your favor, and against Ottoman arms. What we took by the sword, we now surrender by the sword. We return it to those from whom we took it". Peter answered that under his rule, Serbs and Turks would live in peace in Skopje. The Politika newspaper reported that some Ottoman prisoners of war from Skopje were paraded in Belgrade that same day. The king then went by car to the Church of Holy Ascension, and a photograph taken of him sitting in the car became the most widely surfaced photo of his visit to the liberated city; it showed an umpompous king in the midst of war. Metropolitan Vićentije welcomed Peter to the church, and a lity was held, after which Vićentije spoke of the king as a potent and Christian king in a new period of development and well-being for the city. For propaganda purposes, a popular illustrated war magazine used an illustration of the king entering the city on a white horse, a depiction which became very popular in the 1910s and found itself on postcards.

On the 10th-anniversay of the liberation of Skopje, on 26 October 1922, a city festivity and banquet was held, in which minister Nikola Pašić, mayor Aleksandar Bukvić, metropolitan Varnava, Marko Trifković, Svetozar Pribićević, the guslar Petar Perunović, and other parliament members participated, and the following day a commemoration at the Skopje church with the royal family was held in honour of the fallen soldiers. In 1930 the city municipality of Skopje unanimously accepted the proposal of the citizens to hold an annual commemoration of the liberation of Skopje, as a local holiday.

== See also ==
- Battle of Kumanovo

== Sources ==
- Lazarević, Milutin D. (1928). Наши ратови за ослобођење и уједињење. Књ. 1, Српско-турски рат 1912. године. Српска књижевна задруга.
- Milosavljević, Boris (2013). "Балкански ратови". Летопис Матице српске [Annals of Matica srpska]. 491 (3). Matica srpska: 252–288.
- Ratković, Borislav; Đurišić, Mitar; Skoko, Savo (1972). Србија и Црна Гора у балканским ратовима 1912-1913 [Serbia and Montenegro in the Balkan Wars of 1912–1913] (in Serbian). БИГЗ.
- Šijački, Dušan M. (1922). Балкански рат у слици и речи: 1912-1913 (2nd ed.). Штампарија Савића и Комп.
- Borozan, Igor (2013). "Slika moći - trijumfalni ulazak kralja Petra Karađorđevića i prestolonaslednika Aleksandra Karađorđevića u Skoplje" [The image of power: Triumphal entry of King Petar Karadjordjević and Aleksandar Karadjordjević, heir apparent, in Skopje]. Leskovački zbornik. 53. Narodni muzej, Leskovac: 215–228. ISSN 0459-1070.
