= Battle of Gribova =

- Part of the First Balkan War
Date	5–6 November [O.S. 23–24 October] 1912
Location	Ioannina, Greece
Result	Greek victory

Belligerents
(Kingdom of Greece) Greece	Ottoman Empire

Commanders and leaders
Konstantinos Sapountzakis	Esad Pasha

Casualties and losses
4 killed 40 wounded	122 killed 125 wounded

The Battle of Gribova took place between October 23 and 24, 1912. It was fought between Greek and Ottoman forces during the First Balkan War, and resulted in a Greek victory.

== Battle ==
In accordance with the orders of Esad Pasha, the 23rd Regular Division, along with its 4th battalion in Komçiadis, played an important role here as well. On October 23, 1912, the division, together with its reserve units, attacked the slopes of Gribova.

Initially, they captured the forward positions of the Greek army and achieved success. However, the rain, the muddy and slippery ground that made climbing impossible, the undisciplined behavior of the officers and soldiers, the battle being directed by indifferent and ineffective officers, the lack of clear instructions for night fighting, and the difficulties in command and control became evident. In addition, especially on October 24, when the attack continued at night, just as the Austrians experienced in the Battle of Karánsebes, the Ottoman units fighting on the front lines mistook the support and supply units coming to help them for Greek army units and thought they were being surrounded from behind, and engaged in a battle with their own units. The Greeks still did not realize this situation. However, they managed to get the 10th Evzon Battalion to the front line, and with the reinforcements that arrived, they repelled the Ottoman attack. The Battle of Gribova ended in a major defeat for the Ottomans.

== Aftermath ==
In the battle, the Ottoman losses were much heavier than the Greek losses. One of the most important reasons for this outcome was the clash between Ottoman troops who mistakenly thought their own soldiers were Greek soldiers. The disorganization shown by the Regular Division after the battle, the desertion of the supply troops, and the Greek attack from Papas Bridge endangered the corps. As a result, on October 24-25, 1912, Esad Pasha had to withdraw his troops from Beşpınar to positions near Ioannina in the north, defend the positions he held, and abandon his gains at Komçiadis. The situation threatened the port of Preveza, which was an important place for the supply of the Ioannina Corps from the sea. On November 3, 1912, following the clashes near the ancient city of Nicopolis, very close to Preveza, and the Greek attacks from the sea, Preveza fell into the hands of the Epirus army.

== Sources ==
- Erickson, Edward J. (2003). Defeat in Detail: The Ottoman Army in the Balkans, 1912–1913. Westport, CT: Greenwood. ISBN 0-275-97888-5.
- Savaş, Mustafa Talha (2019). Mehmet Esad Bülkat Pasha, One of the Late Ottoman Commanders (1862–1952) (PDF). Sakarya University Institute of Social Sciences. Archived (PDF) from the original on 8 October 2021.
- Nizamoğlu, Yüksel (2010). The Life and Military Activities of Vehip Pasha (Kaçı) (PDF). Istanbul University Institute of Social Sciences. Archived (PDF) from the original on 10 October 2021.
