= Battle of Tuzi =

- Part of First Balkan War
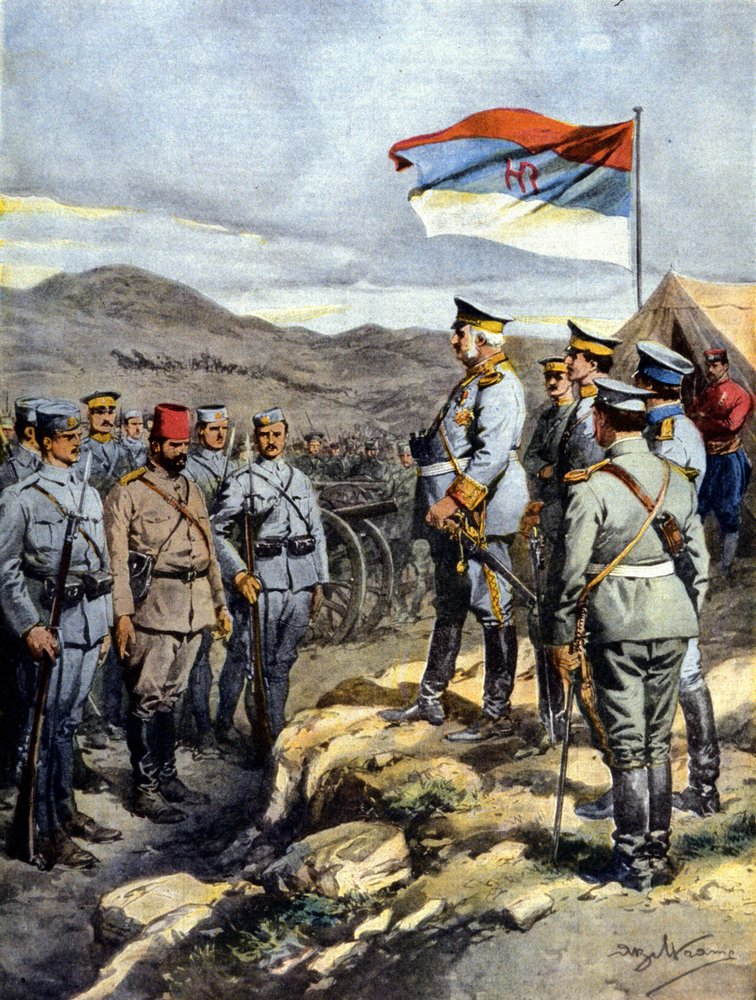
- Surrender of Hamid Bey to king Nicholas I after the battle of Tuzi.
Date	9–15 October 1912
Location	Tuzi, Ottoman Empire (modern-day Montenegro)
Result	Montenegrin victory

Belligerents
Kingdom of Montenegro	Ottoman Empire

Commanders and leaders
Crown Prince Danilo; Mitar Martinović; Blažo Bošković	Esad Pasha; Lt. Col. Hamid Bey

Strength
Zeta Detachment; ~15,000 men (Mixed Brigade, Nikšić Brigade, Bjelopavlići Brigade)	Scutari Division; ~5,000–6,000 regulars (Nizam); ~2,000 irregulars (Bashibazouks)

Casualties and losses
Heavy casualties during the assault on Dečić	Entire garrison surrendered (~5,000 prisoners); 12 field guns captured

The Battle of Tuzi was a significant military engagement fought between the Kingdom of Montenegro and the Ottoman Empire in October 1912, during the opening stages of the First Balkan War. The battle took place in and around the town of Tuzi, a strategic gateway to the city of Scutari (Skadar). The engagement resulted in a decisive Montenegrin victory and the surrender of the Ottoman garrison, opening the path for the Siege of Scutari.

== Background ==
Following the declaration of war by the Kingdom of Montenegro on the Ottoman Empire on 8 October 1912, the Montenegrin army initiated offensive operations. The primary strategic objective of the Montenegrin military was the capture of Scutari. To achieve this, the Montenegrin forces were divided into three detachments. The strongest of these was the Zeta Detachment (Zetski odred), commanded by Crown Prince Danilo, which was tasked with advancing directly towards Scutari along the eastern side of Lake Skadar.

The town of Tuzi was a strategic fortified position barring the road from Podgorica to Scutari. Its capture was a prerequisite for any advance on the Ottoman regional capital. The Ottoman defense relied on a series of fortifications on the surrounding heights, most notably Planinica, Dečić, and Hum, manned by the 24th Scutari Nizam Division under the overall command of Esad Pasha Toptani.

== Forces Involved ==
The Montenegrin attack was led by the Zeta Detachment (Zetski odred), commanded by Crown Prince Danilo. The detachment consisted of the flower of the Montenegrin youth, motivated by the ideal of Serbian national unification. It was organized into three columns:

- Left Column: Commanded by Brigadier Blažo Bošković (Mixed and Bjelopavlići Brigades).
- Center Column: Commanded by Đuro Jovović (Nikšić Brigade).
- Right Column: Commanded by Brigadier Veliša Lazović (Zeta Brigade).

The Ottoman defenders consisted of the 72nd Regiment, battalions from the 70th and 71st Regiments, and thousands of Albanian irregulars (bashi-bazouks). The fortifications were solid stone structures, though outdated against modern artillery.

== The Battle ==
Hostilities commenced on 9 October 1912. The primary objective for the Montenegrin forces was the dominating height of Dečić, which was the key to the entire Tuzi defensive line.

=== Assault on Dečić ===
On 10 October, after an artillery duel, the Montenegrin infantry launched a frontal assault on Dečić. Despite facing heavy fire and lacking coordination between the columns, the sheer ferocity of the attacks by the Montenegrin Serbs overwhelmed the defenders. Historical accounts describe the charges as "epic," characterized by traditional tribal bravery often at the expense of tactical discipline.

By the afternoon of 10 October, the Ottoman reserve attempted a counterattack but was repulsed. The fall of Dečić rendered the position of Tuzi untenable.

=== Surrender ===
Following the loss of the heights and the tightening of the encirclement, the Ottoman commander, Lt. Col. Hamid Bey, realized that further resistance was futile. Despite orders from Scutari to break out towards Plavnica, the garrison remained paralyzed. On 14–15 October, the Ottoman forces in Tuzi surrendered unconditionally.

The Montenegrins captured approximately 5,000 Ottoman soldiers and officers, along with 8 to 12 field guns and vast quantities of war materiel. Western newspapers reported the victory, noting the capture of "six battalions of Turkish troops and eight quick-firing guns," despite initial Ottoman denials.

== Aftermath ==
The victory at Tuzi had significant tactical and morale implications:

- Prisoners of War: A large number of Ottoman soldiers were taken prisoner. Contemporary Australian press reported that following the surrender, the Montenegrins captured the commander and a significant portion of the garrison. Estimates suggest around 5,000 Ottoman soldiers surrendered.
- Material Capture: The Montenegrin army captured substantial quantities of war material, including cannons, rifles, and ammunition, which were used to replenish their supplies for the ongoing campaign.
- Path to Scutari: With Tuzi secured, the Zeta Detachment was able to push forward towards Scutari, eventually joining other Montenegrin forces to establish the siege of the city. However, the delay caused by the need to capture Tuzi allowed the Ottoman commander in Scutari, Essad Pasha Toptani, time to strengthen his defenses.

== See also ==
- First Balkan War
- Siege of Scutari (1912–1913)
- Kingdom of Montenegro
