= Murgah Kakan =

Murgah Kakan مورگاه كاكان
- Village
- Location within Iran
- Coordinates: 30°38′03″N 51°47′12″E
- Country: Iran
- Province: Kohgiluyeh and Boyer-Ahmad
- County: Boyer-Ahmad
- Bakhsh: Central
- Rural District: Kakan

Population (2006)
  - Total: 61
- Time zone: UTC+3:30 (IRST)
  - Summer (DST): UTC+4:30 (IRDT)

Murgah Kakan (Persian: مورگاه كاكان, also Romanized as Mūrgāh Kākān; also known as Mūrgā) is a village in Kakan Rural District, in the Central District of Boyer-Ahmad County, Kohgiluyeh and Boyer-Ahmad Province, Iran. At the 2006 census, its population was 61, in 11 families.
