= Murgas =

Murgas or Murgaš may refer to:

- Gilberto Alfredo Murgas (born 1981), Salvadoran football (soccer) player
- José Antonio Murgas, Colombian politician
- Jozef Murgaš (1864–1929), Slovak inventor, architect, botanist, painter, patriot, and Roman Catholic priest
  - 26639 Murgaš, main belt asteroid named after Jozef Murgaš
- Murgaš (Ub), village in Serbia
- Murgaș, another spelling for Murgași Commune, Dolj County, Romania
- Murgaš, Kumanovo, a village in Kumanovo Municipality, North Macedonia
- The plural of Murga, a form of musical theater performed in Uruguay and in Argentina during the Carnival season
