= Vašarejca =

Vašarejca Вашарејца
- Village
- Location within North Macedonia
- Coordinates: 41.172728°N 21.406619°E
- Country: North Macedonia
- Region: Pelagonia
- Municipality: Mogila

Population (2002)
  - Total: 202
- Time zone: UTC+1 (CET)
  - Summer (DST): UTC+2 (CEST)
- Website: .

Vašarejca (Macedonian: Вашарејца) is a village in the municipality of Mogila, North Macedonia.

== Demographics ==
According to the 2002 census, the village had a total of 202 inhabitants. Ethnic groups in the village include:

- Macedonians 202
