= Church of the Ascension of Jesus, Skopje =

Macedonian Orthodox Church in Skopje, North Macedonia

Coordinates: 42°00′03″N 21°26′09″E

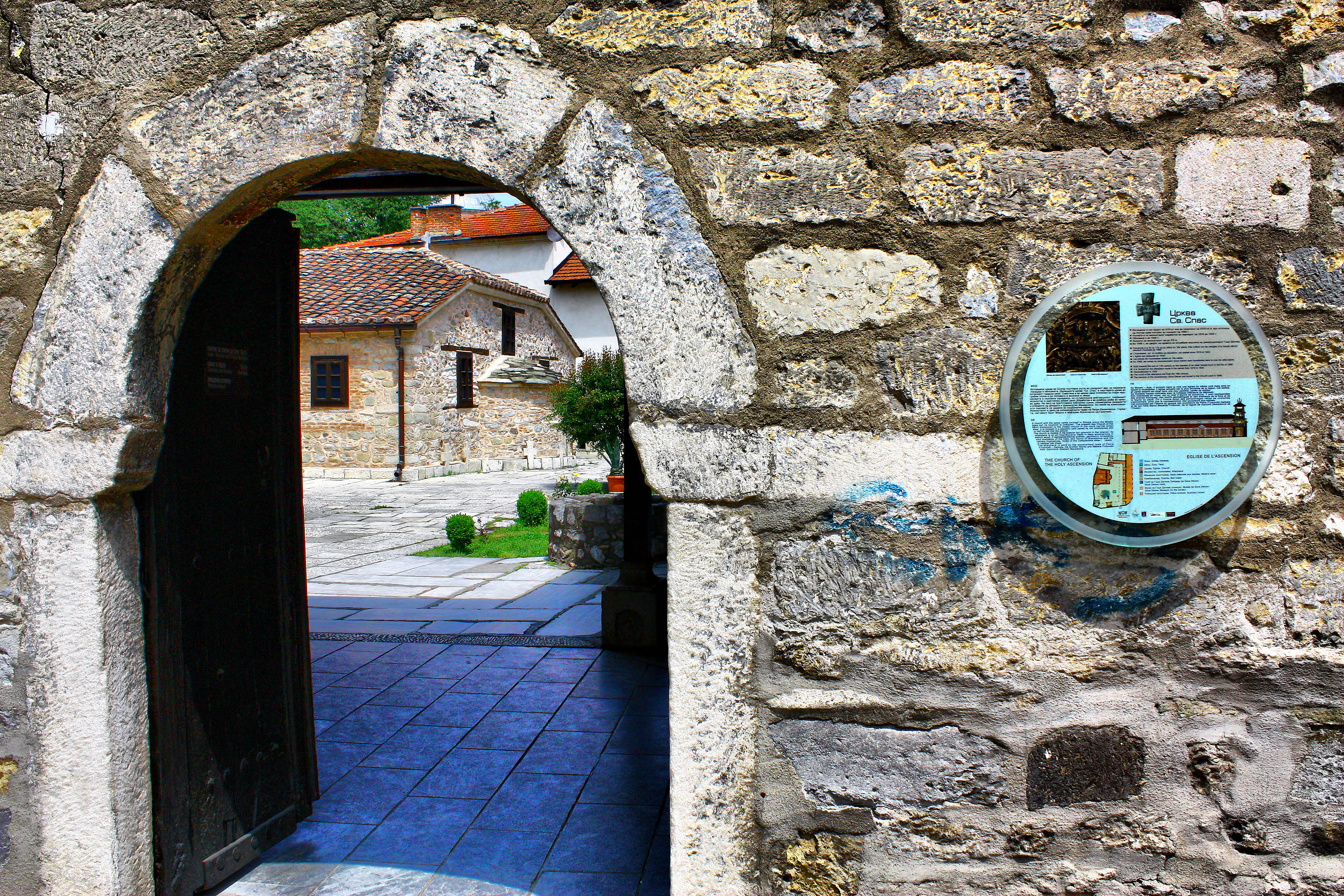
Entrance to the church courtyard

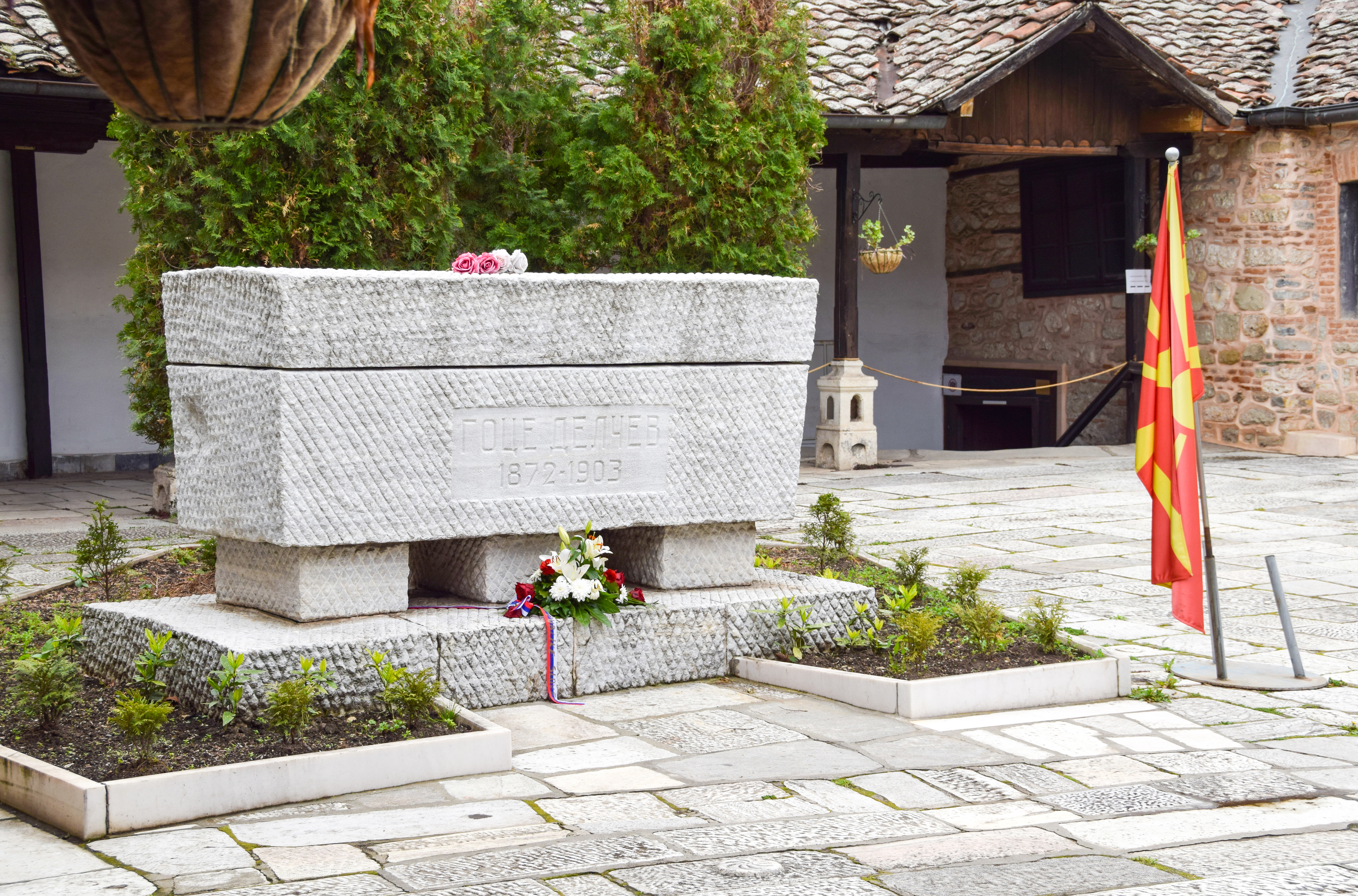
The sarcophagus of Gotse Delchev (2025)

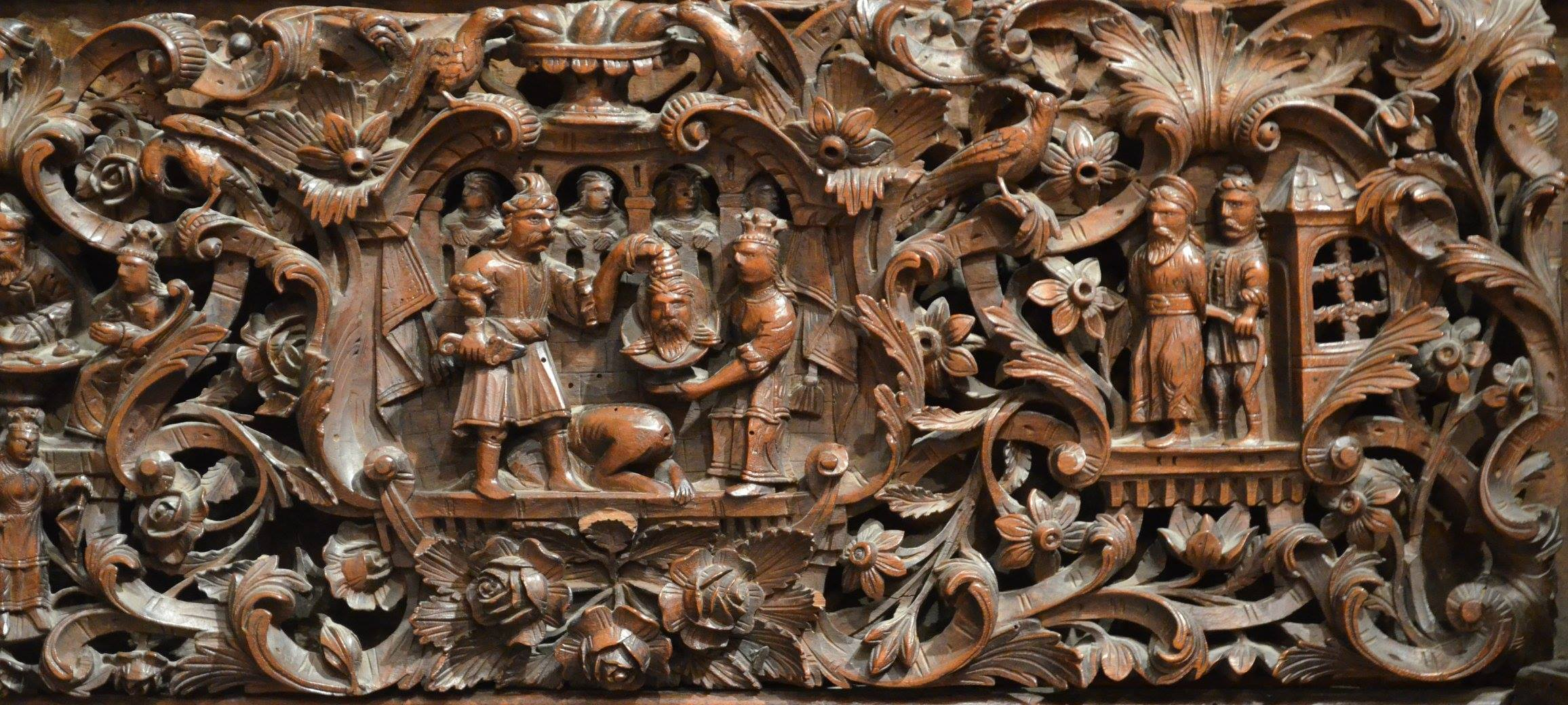
Iconostasis of the Church from 1867. The Beheading of John the Baptist is carried out by figures stylized like Ottoman Turks.

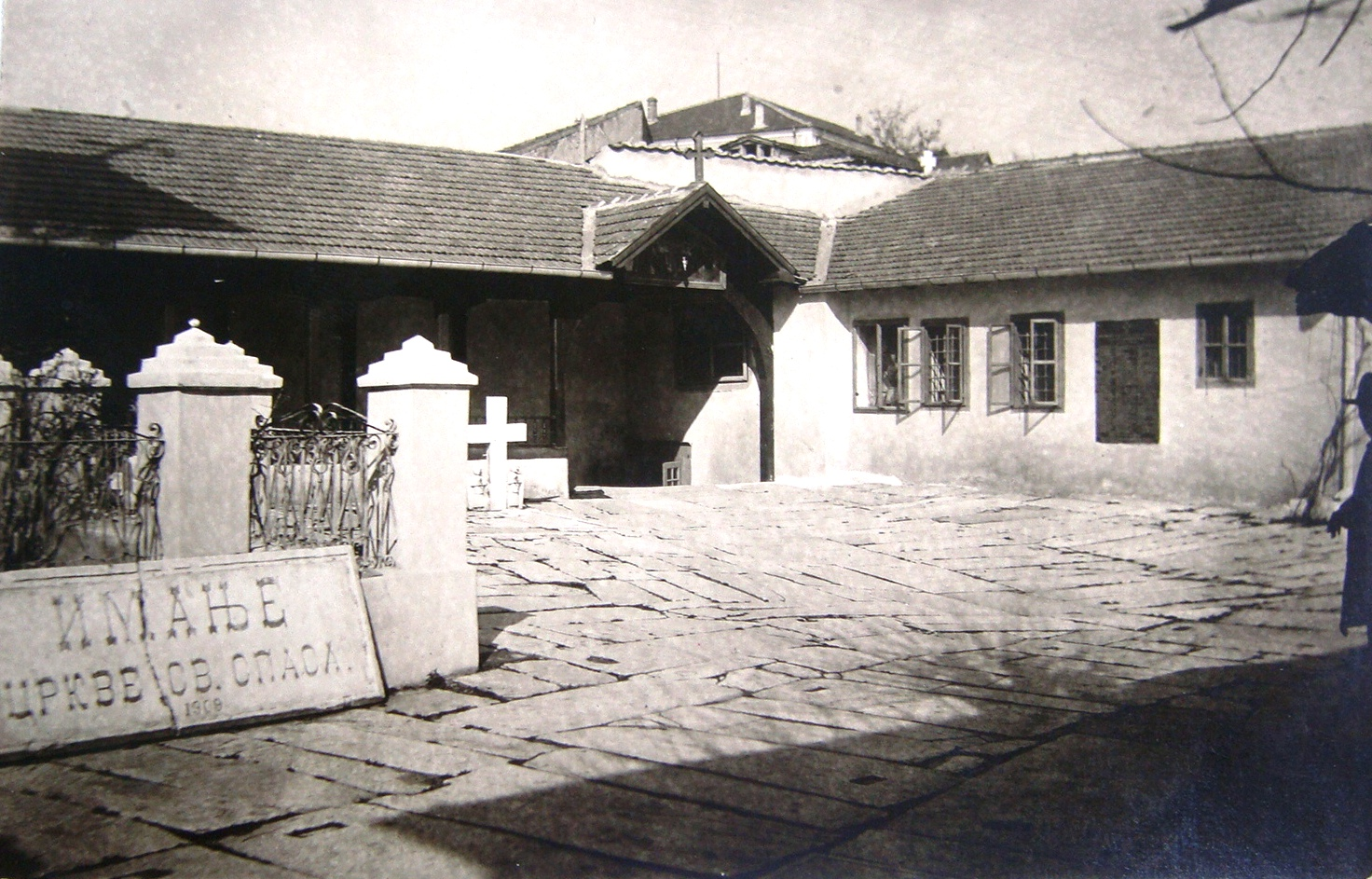
Historical images of Skopje: Church of the Ascension of Jesus, Skopje

The Church of the Ascension of Jesus (Macedonian: Црква „Св. Спас“) is an Eastern Orthodox church in Skopje, North Macedonia. It is situated east of Kale Fortress.

The church was built in the mid-16th century and is three-nave, with the middle vessel arched and flat pages covered with gains in domes. In the west is the gallery for women. On the south wall, above the present level of the floor during the repair of the church year 1963-64 was discovered a flat painting dating from the 16th-17th century. During the 19th century the church was given the final look. In 1824 the iconostasis was completed and in 1867 it was part of the throne icons. The iconostasis and icons were made by cooperatives and traders from Skopje.

The Eastern Orthodox congregation under Ottomans was included in a specific community under Greek domination. With the rise of nationalism, the Slavic population of the area voted in 1874 overwhelmingly, by 91% in favour of joining the Bulgarian Exarchate. This remained so until 1890 when it was taken back by the Greek priests. In 1901 the church was taken from the Serb community and became the seat of the Skopje Metropolitan, Firmilijan and his successors.

The door for entering in the yard is heavy and made from oak. In the yard is a white sarcophagus containing the remains of the revolutionary Gotse Delchev.
