= Nitra (disambiguation) =

Nitra is a city in western Slovakia.

Nitra may also refer to:

- Nitra (Hasidic dynasty), originating from Nitra, Slovakia
- Principality of Nitra, historical entity
- Nitra Region, an administrative region in Slovakia
- Nitra Arena, a sports arena in Nitra, Slovakia
- Nitra Castle, a castle located in the Old Town of Nitra, Slovakia
- Nitra (river), river in western Slovakia

== See also ==
- FC Nitra, a Slovak association football club, playing in Nitra, Slovakia
- HK Nitra, an ice hockey club based in Nitra, Slovakia
- MBK SPU Nitra, a basketball club based in Nitra, Slovakia
- Nitra nad Ipľom, a village and municipality in the Lučenec District in the Banská Bystrica Region of Slovakia
