= Budiná =

Budiná Budaszállás
- Municipality
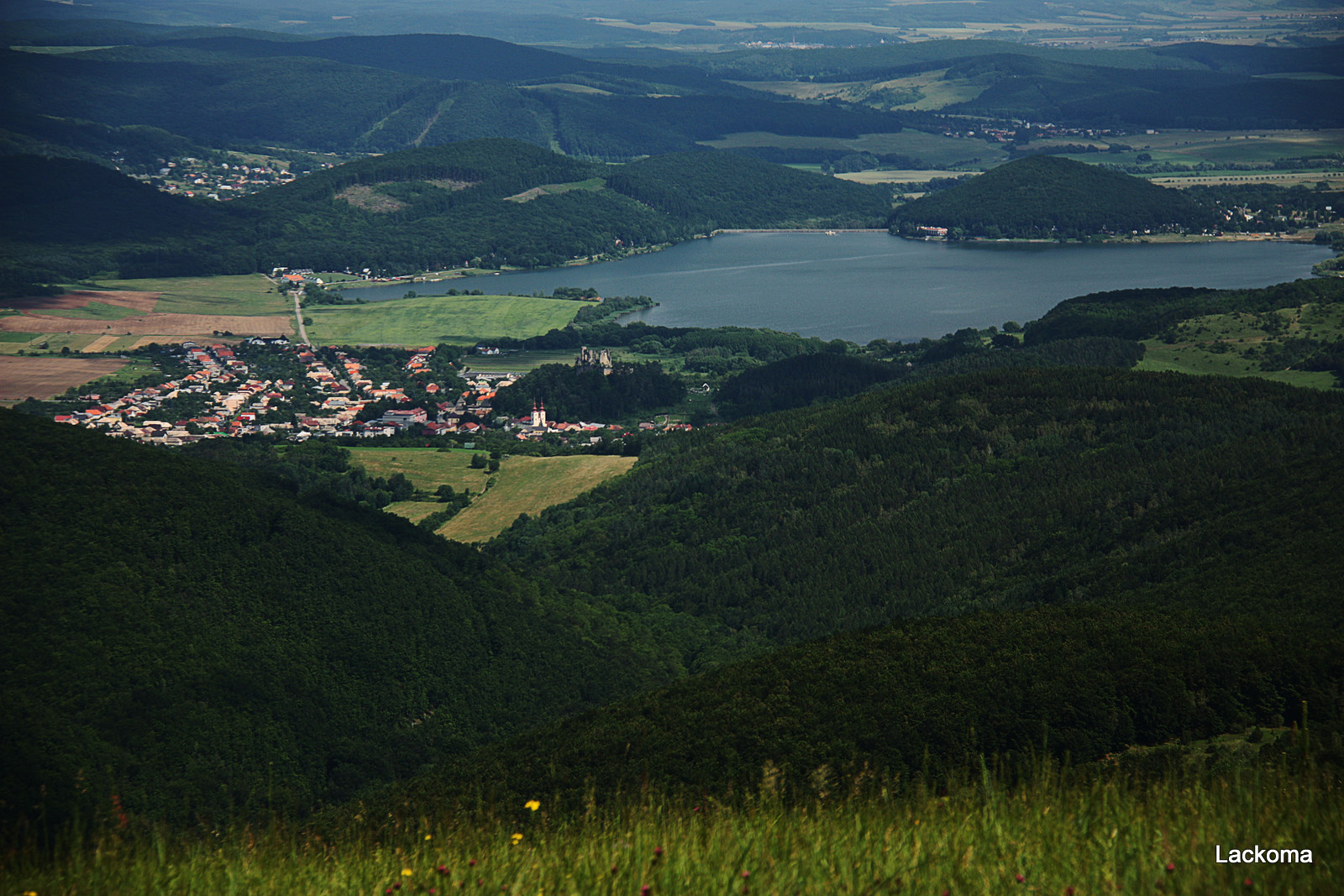

- Flag Coat of arms

- Location of Budiná in the Banská Bystrica Region Location of Budiná in Slovakia
- Coordinates: 48.47°N 19.48°E
- Country: Slovakia
- Region: Banská Bystrica Region
- District: Lučenec District
- First mentioned: 1393

Area
  - Total: 17.31 km^{2} (6.68 sq mi)
- Elevation: 629 m (2,064 ft)

Population (2025)
  - Total: 194
- Time zone: UTC+1 (CET)
  - Summer (DST): UTC+2 (CEST)
- Postal code: 985 12
- Area code: +421 47
- Vehicle registration plate (until 2022): LC
- Website: obecbudina.sk

Budiná (Hungarian: Budaszállás) is a village and municipality in the Lučenec District in the Banská Bystrica Region of Slovakia.

== Geography ==
The municipality lies at an altitude of 629 metres (2,064 ft) and covers an area of 17.31 km^{2} (6.68 sq mi) (2025).

== History ==
In historical records, the village was first mentioned in 1393 (1393 Brtolehutaya, 1467 Budalehotha). It belonged to Divín castle. From 1554 to 1595 it suffered Turkish occupation.

== Population ==
Population statistic (10 years)
Year	1995	2005	2015	2025
Count	386	284	247	194
Difference		−26.42%	−13.02%	−21.45%

Population statistic
Year	2024	2025
Count	198	194
Difference		−2.02%

It has a population of 194 people (31 December 2025).

=== Ethnicity ===
Census 2021 (1+ %)
Ethnicity	Number	Fraction
Slovak	201	97.1%
Not found out	6	2.89%
Total	207	

In year 2021 was 207 people by ethnicity 201 as Slovak, 6 as Not found out and 1 as Czech.

Note on population: The difference values of population numbers in the table "Population statistic" and in the sections "Ethnicity" & "Religion" is caused by the use of various statistical methods.

=== Religion ===
Census 2021 (1+ %)
Religion	Number	Fraction
Roman Catholic Church	108	52.17%
Evangelical Church	76	36.71%
None	16	7.73%
Not found out	6	2.9%
Total	207	

In year 2021 was 207 people by religion 108 from Roman Catholic Church, 76 from Evangelical Church, 16 from None, 6 from Not found out and 1 from Other.
