= Veľká nad Ipľom =

Veľká nad Ipľom Vilke
- Municipality
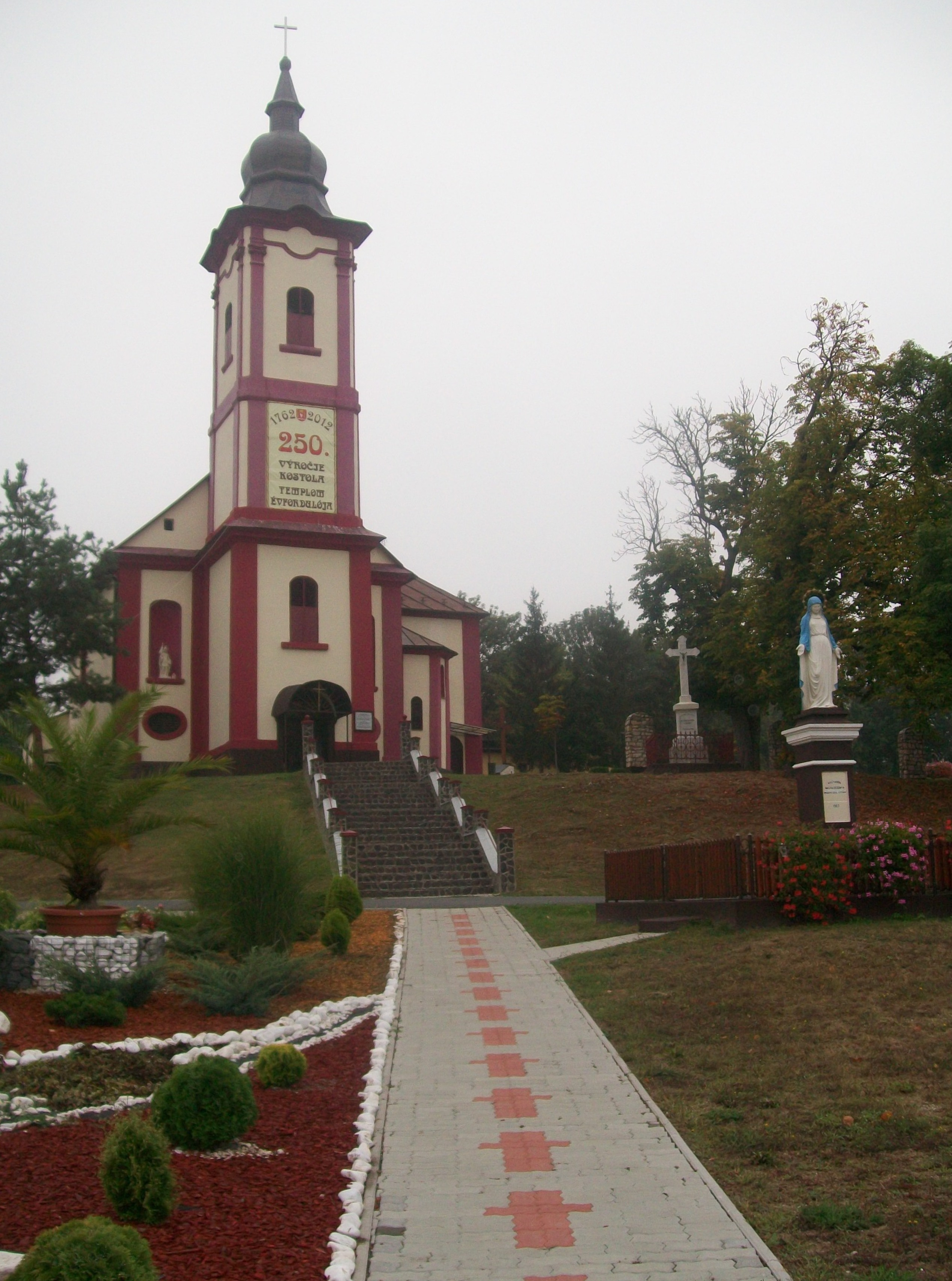
- Roman Catholic All Saints Church

- Flag

- Location of Veľká nad Ipľom in the Banská Bystrica Region Location of Veľká nad Ipľom in Slovakia
- Coordinates: 48.27°N 19.62°E
- Country: Slovakia
- Region: Banská Bystrica Region
- District: Lučenec District
- First mentioned: 1238

Area
  - Total: 24.54 km^{2} (9.47 sq mi)
- Elevation: 169 m (554 ft)

Population (2025)
  - Total: 959
- Time zone: UTC+1 (CET)
  - Summer (DST): UTC+2 (CEST)
- Postal code: 985 32
- Area code: +421 47
- Vehicle registration plate (until 2022): LC
- Website: www.velkanadiplom.sk

Veľká nad Ipľom (Hungarian: Vilke) is a village and municipality in the Lučenec District in the Banská Bystrica Region of Slovakia.

== Geography ==
The municipality lies at an altitude of 169 metres (554 ft) and covers an area of 24.54 km^{2} (9.47 sq mi) (2025).

== Population ==
Population statistic (10 years)
Year	1995	2005	2015	2025
Count	878	928	935	959
Difference		+5.69%	+0.75%	+2.56%

Population statistic
Year	2024	2025
Count	954	959
Difference		+0.52%

It has a population of 959 people (31 December 2025).

=== Ethnicity ===
Census 2021 (1+ %)
Ethnicity	Number	Fraction
Slovak	584	62.66%
Hungarian	307	32.93%
Romani	120	12.87%
Not found out	76	8.15%
Total	932	

In year 2021 was 932 people by ethnicity 584 as Slovak, 307 as Hungarian, 120 as Romani, 76 as Not found out, 5 as Czech, 4 as Turkish, 2 as German, 1 as Ukrainian and 1 as Bulgarian.

Note on population: The difference values of population numbers in the table "Population statistic" and in the sections "Ethnicity" & "Religion" is caused by the use of various statistical methods.

=== Religion ===
Census 2021 (1+ %)
Religion	Number	Fraction
Roman Catholic Church	612	65.67%
None	152	16.31%
Not found out	62	6.65%
Evangelical Church	46	4.94%
Baptists Church	31	3.33%
Total	932	

In year 2021 was 932 people by religion 612 from Roman Catholic Church, 152 from None, 62 from Not found out, 46 from Evangelical Church, 31 from Baptists Church, 5 from Other and not ascertained christian church, 5 from Islam, 4 from Calvinist Church, 3 from Christian Congregations in Slovakia, 3 from Greek Catholic Church, 2 from Paganism and natural spirituality, 2 from Other, 2 from Seventh-day Adventist Church, 1 from Eastern Orthodox Church, 1 from Buddhism and 1 from Ad hoc movements.
