= Fiľakovské Kováče =

Village and municipality in Slovakia

Fiľakovské Kováče Fülekkovácsi
- Municipality
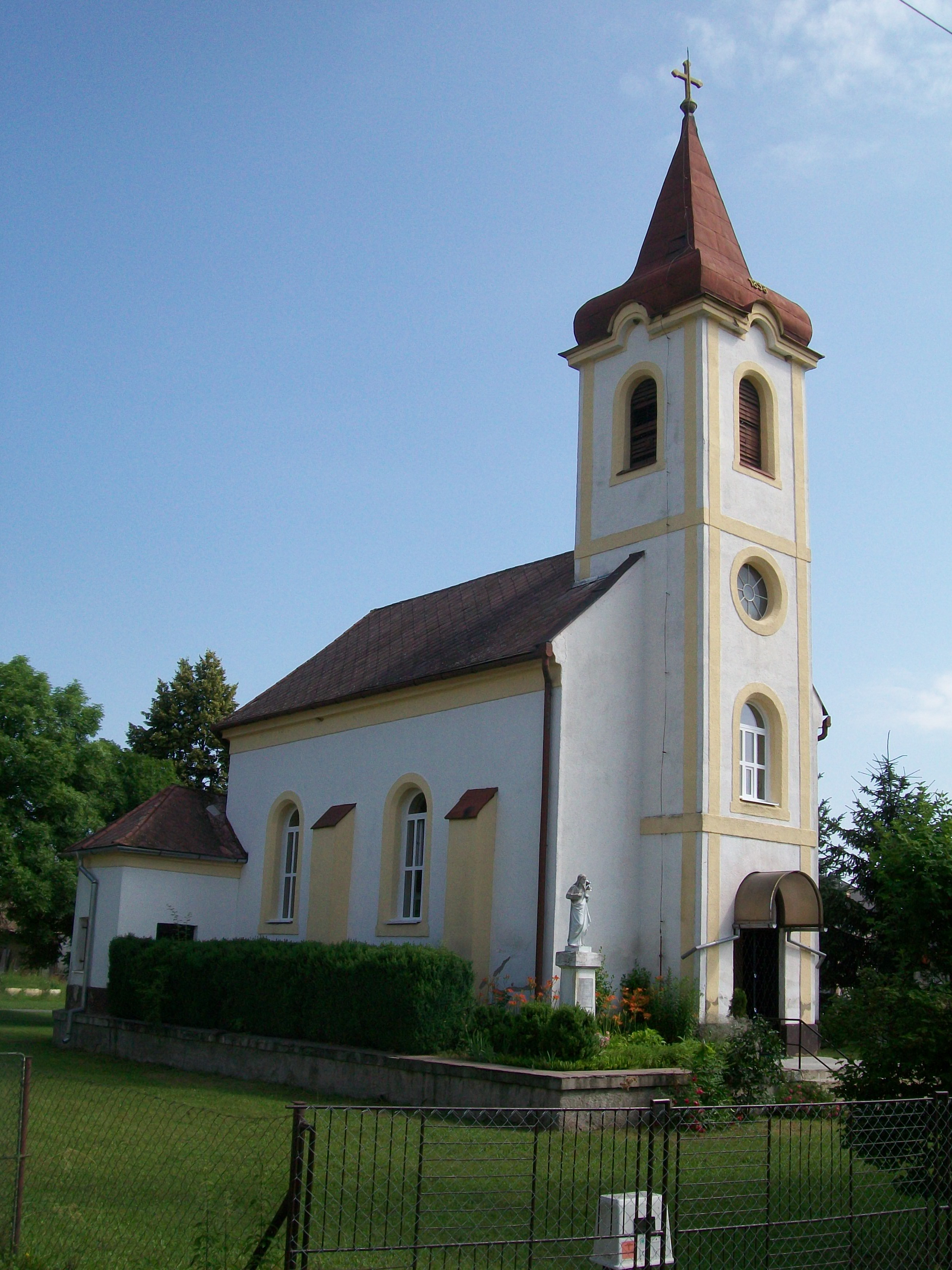
- Roman Catholic church in Fiľakovské Kováče

- Flag

- Location of Fiľakovské Kováče in the Banská Bystrica Region Location of Fiľakovské Kováče in Slovakia
- Coordinates: 48.30°N 19.78°E
- Country: Slovakia
- Region: Banská Bystrica Region
- District: Lučenec District
- First mentioned: 1246

Area
  - Total: 11.42 km^{2} (4.41 sq mi)
- Elevation: 185 m (607 ft)

Population (2025)
  - Total: 921
- Time zone: UTC+1 (CET)
  - Summer (DST): UTC+2 (CEST)
- Postal code: 986 01
- Area code: +421 47
- Vehicle registration plate (until 2022): LC
- Website: filakovskekovace.sk

Fiľakovské Kováče (Hungarian: Fülekkovácsi) is a village and municipality in the Lučenec District in the Banská Bystrica Region of Slovakia.

== Geography ==
The municipality lies at an altitude of 185 metres (607 ft) and covers an area of 11.42 km^{2} (4.41 sq mi) (2025).

== History ==
In historical records, the village was first mentioned in 1246 (1246 Cuach, 1295 Koachy, 1454 Kowachy). It belonged to Fil’akovo town. In 1548 it was destroyed by Turks. From 1938 to 1945 it belonged to Hungary.

== Population ==
Population statistic (10 years)
| Year | 1995 | 2005 | 2015 | 2025 |
|---|---|---|---|---|
| Count | 883 | 902 | 910 | 921 |
| Difference | | +2.15% | +0.88% | +1.20% |

Population statistic
| Year | 2024 | 2025 |
|---|---|---|
| Count | 918 | 921 |
| Difference | | +0.32% |

It has a population of 921 people (31 December 2025).

=== Ethnicity ===
Census 2021 (1+ %)
| Ethnicity | Number | Fraction |
|---|---|---|
| Slovak | 466 | 51.26% |
| Hungarian | 454 | 49.94% |
| Not found out | 24 | 2.64% |
| Total | 909 | |

In year 2021 was 909 people by ethnicity 466 as Slovak, 454 as Hungarian, 24 as Not found out, 6 as Romani, 4 as Czech and 1 as Austrian.

Note on population: The difference values of population numbers in the table "Population statistic" and in the sections "Ethnicity" & "Religion" is caused by the use of various statistical methods.

=== Religion ===
Census 2021 (1+ %)
| Religion | Number | Fraction |
|---|---|---|
| Roman Catholic Church | 745 | 81.96% |
| None | 85 | 9.35% |
| Evangelical Church | 30 | 3.3% |
| Not found out | 26 | 2.86% |
| Total | 909 | |

In year 2021 was 909 people by religion 745 from Roman Catholic Church, 85 from None, 30 from Evangelical Church, 26 from Not found out, 8 from Greek Catholic Church, 6 from Calvinist Church, 6 from Christian Congregations in Slovakia, 1 from Eastern Orthodox Church, 1 from United Methodist Church and 1 from Buddhism.

== Genealogical resources ==
The records for genealogical research are available at the state archive "Statny Archiv in Banska Bystrica, Slovakia"

- Roman Catholic church records (births/marriages/deaths): 1700-1893 (parish B)
- Lutheran church records (births/marriages/deaths): 1783-1895 (parish B)

== See also ==
- List of municipalities and towns in Slovakia
