= Trenč =

Trenč Tőrincs
- Municipality
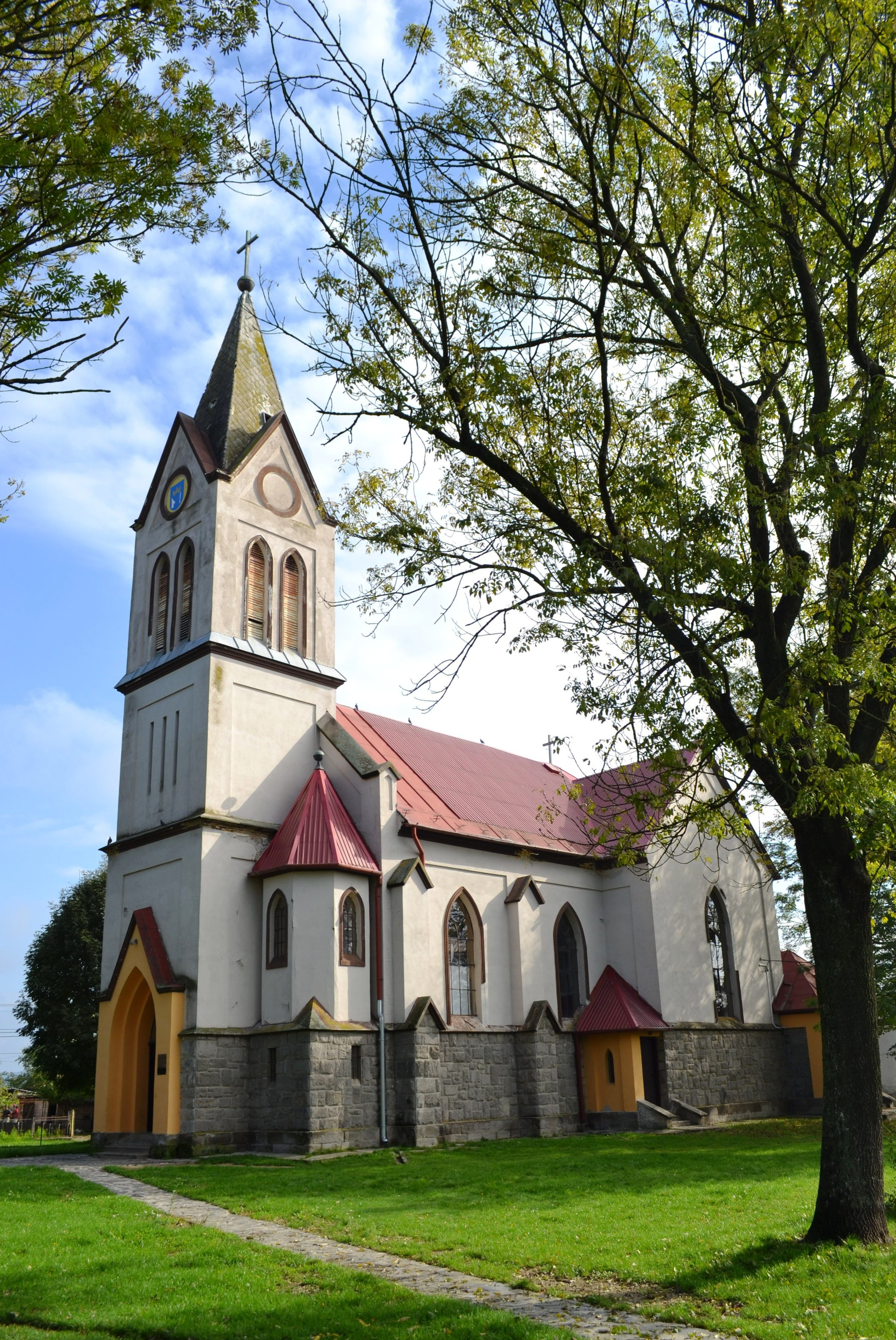
- Roman Catholic church in Trenč

- Flag

- Location of Trenč in the Banská Bystrica Region Location of Trenč in Slovakia
- Coordinates: 48.23°N 19.58°E
- Country: Slovakia
- Region: Banská Bystrica Region
- District: Lučenec District
- First mentioned: 1327

Area
  - Total: 17.45 km^{2} (6.74 sq mi)
- Elevation: 181 m (594 ft)

Population (2025)
  - Total: 532
- Time zone: UTC+1 (CET)
  - Summer (DST): UTC+2 (CEST)
- Postal code: 985 32
- Area code: +421 47
- Vehicle registration plate (until 2022): LC
- Website: www.trenc.sk

Trenč (Hungarian: Tőrincs) is a village and municipality in the Lučenec District in the Banská Bystrica Region of Slovakia.

== Geography ==
The municipality lies at an altitude of 181 metres (594 ft) and covers an area of 17.45 km^{2} (6.74 sq mi) (2025).

== Population ==
Population statistic (10 years)
Year	1995	2005	2015	2025
Count	311	400	472	532
Difference		+28.61%	+18%	+12.71%

Population statistic
Year	2024	2025
Count	538	532
Difference		−1.11%

It has a population of 532 people (31 December 2025).

=== Ethnicity ===
Census 2021 (1+ %)
Ethnicity	Number	Fraction
Slovak	433	77.59%
Not found out	73	13.08%
Hungarian	51	9.13%
Romani	16	2.86%
Total	558	

In year 2021 was 558 people by ethnicity 433 as Slovak, 73 as Not found out, 51 as Hungarian, 16 as Romani, 4 as Italian, 1 as Czech and 1 as English.

Note on population: The difference values of population numbers in the table "Population statistic" and in the sections "Ethnicity" & "Religion" is caused by the use of various statistical methods.

The vast majority of the municipality's population consists of the local Roma community. In 2019, they constituted an estimated 92% of the local population.

=== Religion ===
Census 2021 (1+ %)
Religion	Number	Fraction
Roman Catholic Church	366	65.59%
Not found out	81	14.52%
None	74	13.26%
Evangelical Church	19	3.41%
Christian Congregations in Slovakia	8	1.43%
Total	558	

In year 2021 was 558 people by religion 366 from Roman Catholic Church, 81 from Not found out, 74 from None, 19 from Evangelical Church, 8 from Christian Congregations in Slovakia, 3 from Calvinist Church, 2 from Jehovah's Witnesses, 2 from United Methodist Church, 1 from Old Catholic Church, 1 from Islam and 1 from Greek Catholic Church.
