= Lehôtka =

Lehôtka Gácsliget
- Municipality
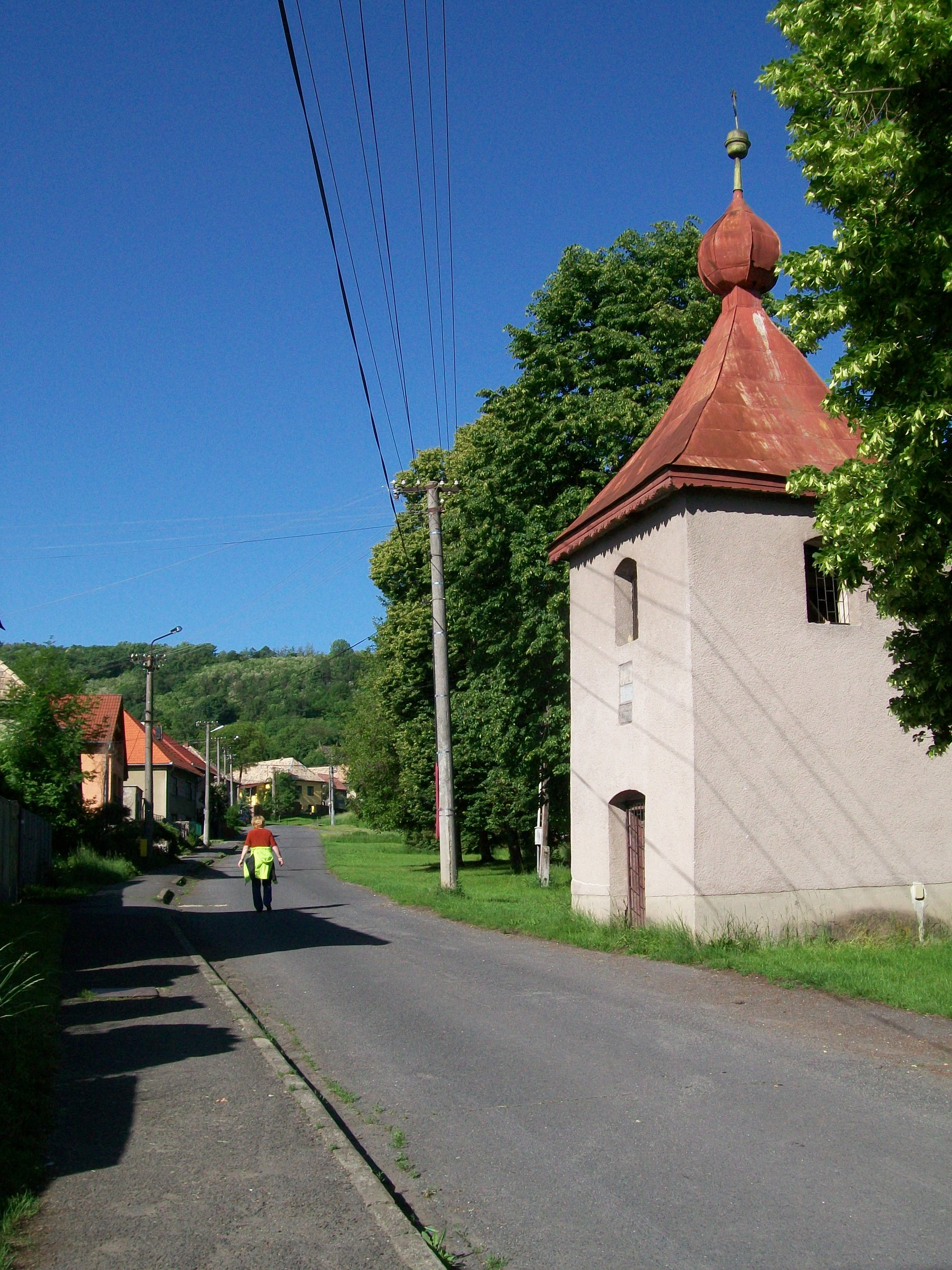
- Belfry in the village Lehôtka

- Flag

- Location of Lehôtka in the Banská Bystrica Region Location of Lehôtka in Slovakia
- Coordinates: 48.34°N 19.54°E
- Country: Slovakia
- Region: Banská Bystrica Region
- District: Lučenec District
- First mentioned: 1385

Area
  - Total: 8.26 km^{2} (3.19 sq mi)
- Elevation: 248 m (814 ft)

Population (2025)
  - Total: 365
- Time zone: UTC+1 (CET)
  - Summer (DST): UTC+2 (CEST)
- Postal code: 985 11
- Area code: +421 47
- Vehicle registration plate (until 2022): LC
- Website: www.lehotka.sk

Lehôtka (Hungarian: Gácsliget) is a village and municipality in the Lučenec District in the Banská Bystrica Region of Slovakia.

== Geography ==
The municipality lies at an altitude of 248 metres (814 ft) and covers an area of 8.26 km^{2} (3.19 sq mi) (2025).

== Population ==
Population statistic (10 years)
Year	1995	2005	2015	2025
Count	298	330	343	365
Difference		+10.73%	+3.93%	+6.41%

Population statistic
Year	2024	2025
Count	359	365
Difference		+1.67%

It has a population of 365 people (31 December 2025).

=== Ethnicity ===
Census 2021 (1+ %)
Ethnicity	Number	Fraction
Slovak	339	95.49%
Not found out	18	5.07%
Hungarian	4	1.12%
Total	355	

In year 2021 was 355 people by ethnicity 339 as Slovak, 18 as Not found out, 4 as Hungarian, 1 as Czech and 1 as Other.

Note on population: The difference values of population numbers in the table "Population statistic" and in the sections "Ethnicity" & "Religion" is caused by the use of various statistical methods.

=== Religion ===
Census 2021 (1+ %)
Religion	Number	Fraction
None	131	36.9%
Roman Catholic Church	120	33.8%
Evangelical Church	88	24.79%
Not found out	12	3.38%
Total	355	

In year 2021 was 355 people by religion 131 from None, 120 from Roman Catholic Church, 88 from Evangelical Church, 12 from Not found out, 1 from Old Catholic Church, 1 from Other and not ascertained christian church, 1 from Other and 1 from Greek Catholic Church.
