= Holiša =

Village and municipality in Slovakia

Holiša Ipolygalsa
- Municipality
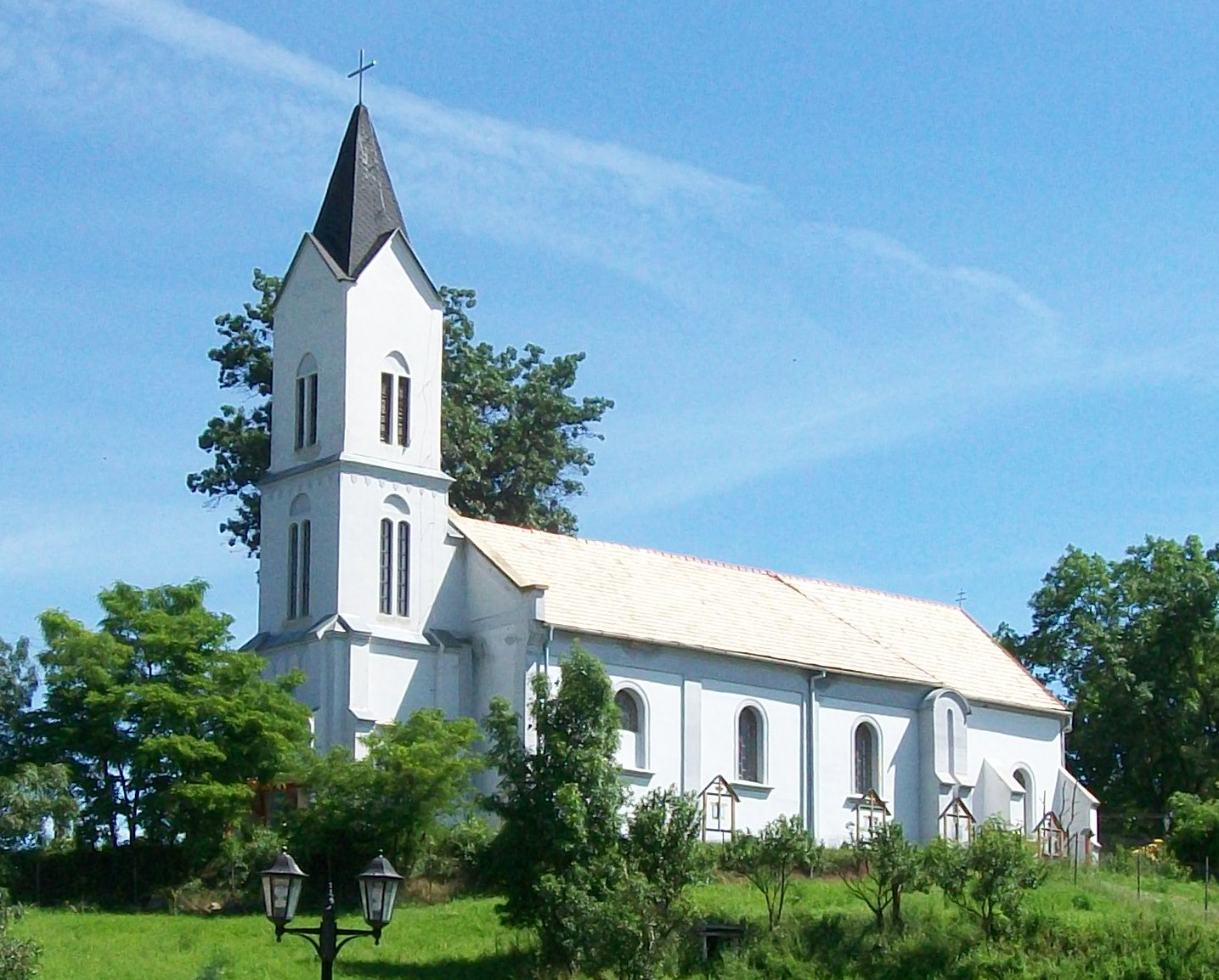
- Roman Catholic church in Holiša

- Flag

- Location of Holiša in the Banská Bystrica Region Location of Holiša in Slovakia
- Coordinates: 48.32°N 19.75°E
- Country: Slovakia
- Region: Banská Bystrica Region
- District: Lučenec District
- First mentioned: 1246

Area
  - Total: 10.34 km^{2} (3.99 sq mi)
- Elevation: 179 m (587 ft)

Population (2025)
  - Total: 674
- Time zone: UTC+1 (CET)
  - Summer (DST): UTC+2 (CEST)
- Postal code: 985 57
- Area code: +421 47
- Vehicle registration plate (until 2022): LC
- Website: www.ocuholisa.sk

Holiša (Hungarian: Ipolygalsa) is a village and municipality in the Lučenec District in the Banská Bystrica Region of Slovakia.

== Geography ==
The municipality lies at an altitude of 179 metres (587 ft) and covers an area of 10.34 km^{2} (3.99 sq mi) (2025).

== History ==
In historical records, the village was first mentioned in 1246. It belonged to local nobles Lossonczy. From 1554 to 1594 it was occupied by Turks, and after it passed to Forgách, Koháry and Coburg. A castle had existed in the village until the 15th century. From 1938 to 1945 it belonged to Hungary.

== Population ==
Population statistic (10 years)
| Year | 1995 | 2005 | 2015 | 2025 |
|---|---|---|---|---|
| Count | 505 | 647 | 669 | 674 |
| Difference | | +28.11% | +3.40% | +0.74% |

Population statistic
| Year | 2024 | 2025 |
|---|---|---|
| Count | 671 | 674 |
| Difference | | +0.44% |

It has a population of 674 people (31 December 2025).

=== Ethnicity ===
Census 2021 (1+ %)
| Ethnicity | Number | Fraction |
|---|---|---|
| Slovak | 390 | 58.2% |
| Hungarian | 298 | 44.47% |
| Romani | 20 | 2.98% |
| Not found out | 20 | 2.98% |
| Total | 670 | |

In year 2021 was 670 people by ethnicity 390 as Slovak, 298 as Hungarian, 20 as Romani, 20 as Not found out, 3 as Czech, 3 as Ukrainian, 1 as Jewish, 1 as Russian, 1 as Other and 1 as Albanian.

Note on population: The difference values of population numbers in the table "Population statistic" and in the sections "Ethnicity" & "Religion" is caused by the use of various statistical methods.

=== Religion ===
Census 2021 (1+ %)
| Religion | Number | Fraction |
|---|---|---|
| Roman Catholic Church | 457 | 68.21% |
| None | 145 | 21.64% |
| Evangelical Church | 37 | 5.52% |
| Total | 670 | |

In year 2021 was 670 people by religion 457 from Roman Catholic Church, 145 from None, 37 from Evangelical Church, 6 from Not found out, 5 from Baptists Church, 4 from Calvinist Church, 4 from Jehovah's Witnesses, 3 from Eastern Orthodox Church, 3 from Islam, 1 from Old Catholic Church, 1 from Other and not ascertained christian church, 1 from Christian Congregations in Slovakia, 1 from Greek Catholic Church, 1 from Buddhism and 1 from Ad hoc movements.

== Genealogical resources ==
The records for genealogical research are available at the state archive "Statny Archiv in Banska Bystrica, Slovakia"

- Roman Catholic church records (births/marriages/deaths): 1773-1892 (parish A)
- Lutheran church records (births/marriages/deaths): 1783-1895 (parish B)

== See also ==
- List of municipalities and towns in Slovakia
