= Tuhár =

Municipality of Slovakia

Tuhár Tugár
- Municipality
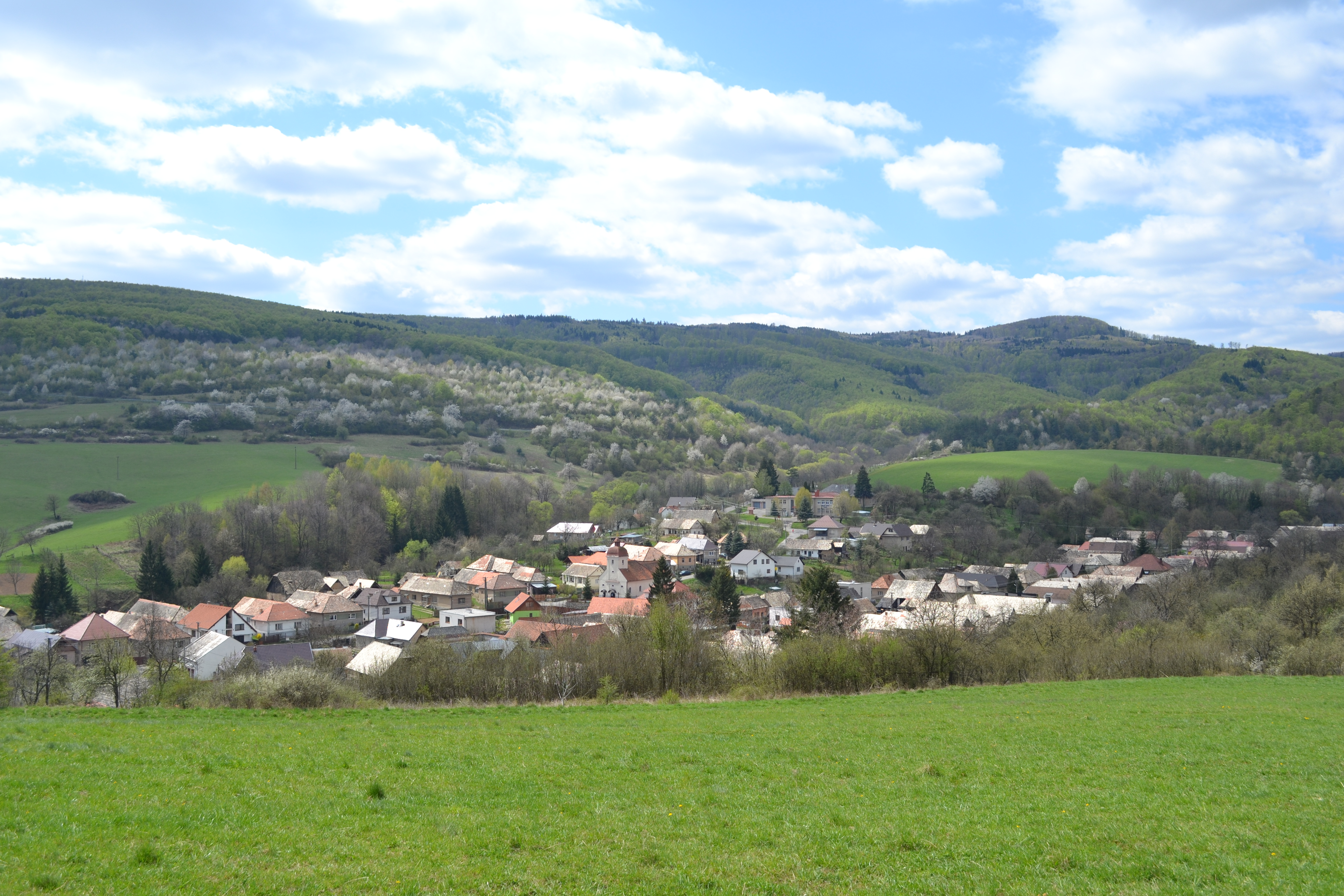

- Flag

- Location of Tuhár in the Banská Bystrica Region Location of Tuhár in Slovakia
- Coordinates: 48.43°N 19.52°E
- Country: Slovakia
- Region: Banská Bystrica Region
- District: Lučenec District
- First mentioned: 1573

Area
  - Total: 19.23 km^{2} (7.42 sq mi)
- Elevation: 384 m (1,260 ft)

Population (2025)
  - Total: 324
- Time zone: UTC+1 (CET)
  - Summer (DST): UTC+2 (CEST)
- Postal code: 985 12
- Area code: +421 47
- Vehicle registration plate (until 2022): LC
- Website: www.tuhar.sk

Tuhár (Hungarian: Tugár) is a village and municipality in the Lučenec District in the Banská Bystrica Region of Slovakia. In Tuhár one can observe rare archaeological finds due to the villages history during the Bronze Age. As of January 1, 1993, this village has been an official part of the Slovak Republic. The current mayor is Bc. Peter Čeman who was elected for his third term during the municipal elections of 2018. The chief controller of the municipality is Mgr. Erika Kajbová who carries out various legal activities.

== Geography ==
The municipality lies at an altitude of 384 metres (1,260 ft) and covers an area of 19.23 km^{2} (7.42 sq mi) (2025).

== Population ==
Population statistic (10 years)
Year	1995	2005	2015	2025
Count	475	410	358	324
Difference		−13.68%	−12.68%	−9.49%

Population statistic
Year	2024	2025
Count	326	324
Difference		−0.61%

It has a population of 324 people (31 December 2025).

=== Ethnicity ===
Census 2021 (1+%)
Ethnicity	Number	Fraction
Slovak	330	97.34%
Not found out	8	2.35%
Total	339	

In year 2021 was 339 people by ethnicity 330 as Slovak, 8 as Not found out, 1 as Czech and 1 as Russian.

Note on population: The difference values of population numbers in the table "Population statistic" and in the sections "Ethnicity" & "Religion" is caused by the use of various statistical methods.

=== Religion ===
Census 2021 (1+%)
Religion	Number	Fraction
Roman Catholic Church	269	79.35%
None	46	13.57%
Not found out	9	2.65%
Greek Catholic Church	7	2.06%
Evangelical Church	7	2.06%
Total	339	

In year 2021 was 339 people by religion 269 from Roman Catholic Church, 46 from None, 9 from Not found out, 7 from Greek Catholic Church, 7 from Evangelical Church and 1 from Christian Congregations in Slovakia.
