= Píla, Lučenec District =

Píla Fűrész
- Municipality
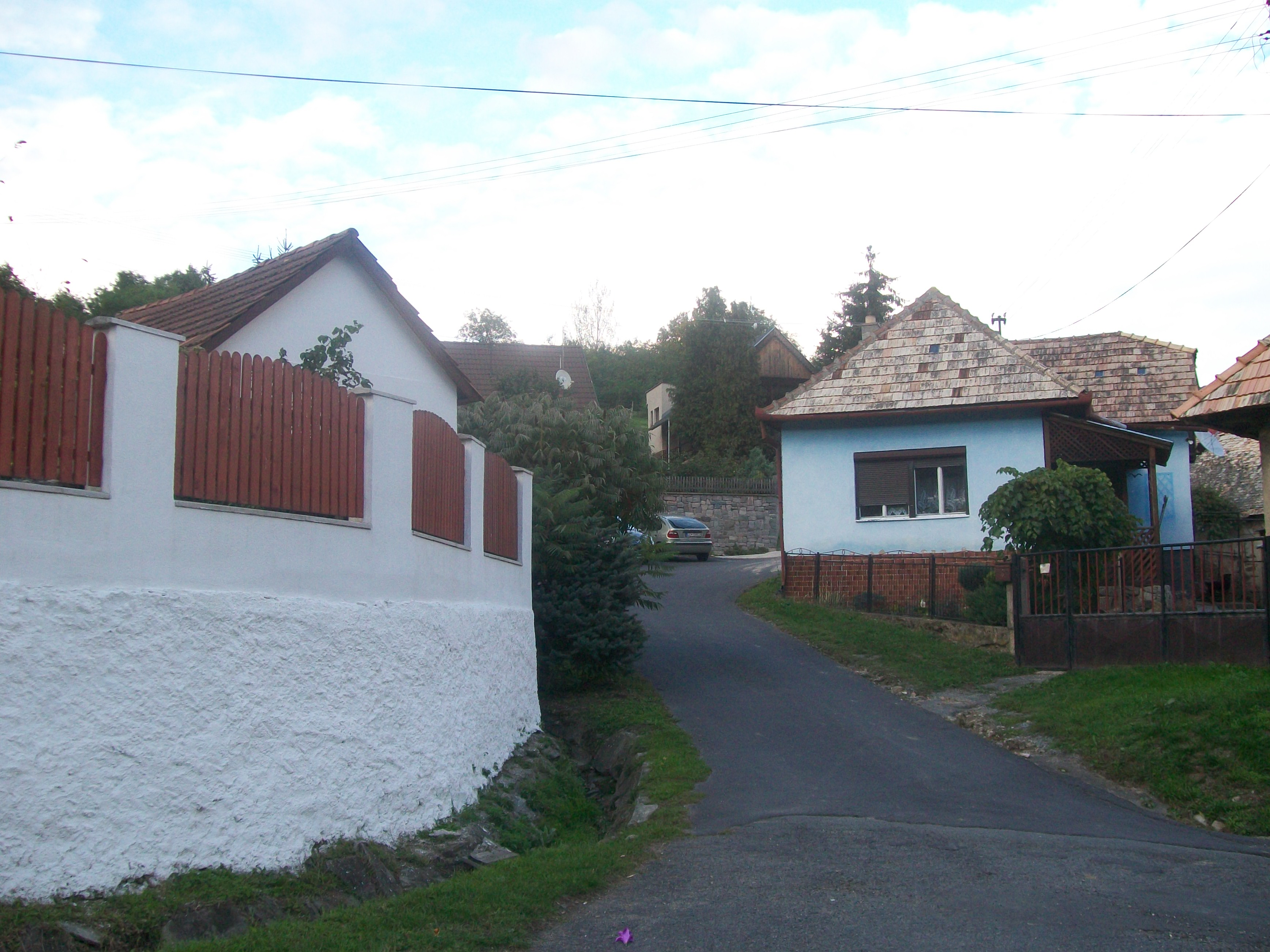

- Flag

- Location of Píla in the Banská Bystrica Region Location of Píla in Slovakia
- Coordinates: 48°29′00″N 19°30′26″E
- Country: Slovakia
- Region: Banská Bystrica Region
- District: Lučenec District
- First mentioned: 1456

Area
  - Total: 7.55 km^{2} (2.92 sq mi)
- Elevation: 330 m (1,080 ft)

Population (2025)
  - Total: 253
- Time zone: UTC+1 (CET)
  - Summer (DST): UTC+2 (CEST)
- Postal code: 985 53
- Area code: +421 47
- Vehicle registration plate (until 2022): LC
- Website: www.pila-obec.sk

Píla (Hungarian: Fűrész) is a village and municipality in the Lučenec District in the Banská Bystrica Region of Slovakia.

== Population ==
Population statistic (10 years)
Year	1995	2005	2015	2025
Count	294	283	259	253
Difference		−3.74%	−8.48%	−2.31%

Population statistic
Year	2024	2025
Count	251	253
Difference		+0.79%

It has a population of 253 people (31 December 2025).

=== Ethnicity ===
Census 2021 (1+ %)
Ethnicity	Number	Fraction
Slovak	243	97.98%
Other	4	1.61%
Total	248	

In year 2021 was 248 people by ethnicity 243 as Slovak, 4 as Other, 2 as Czech, 2 as Hungarian, 1 as Serbian, 1 as Romani and 1 as Not found out.

Note on population: The difference values of population numbers in the table "Population statistic" and in the sections "Ethnicity" & "Religion" is caused by the use of various statistical methods.

=== Religion ===
Census 2021 (1+ %)
Religion	Number	Fraction
Evangelical Church	95	38.31%
Roman Catholic Church	82	33.06%
None	57	22.98%
Calvinist Church	7	2.82%
Other	3	1.21%
Total	248	

In year 2021 was 248 people by religion 95 from Evangelical Church, 82 from Roman Catholic Church, 57 from None, 7 from Calvinist Church, 3 from Other, 1 from Not found out, 1 from Greek Catholic Church, 1 from United Methodist Church and 1 from Czechoslovak Hussite Church.
