= Lipovany =

Lipovany Romhánypuszta
- Municipality
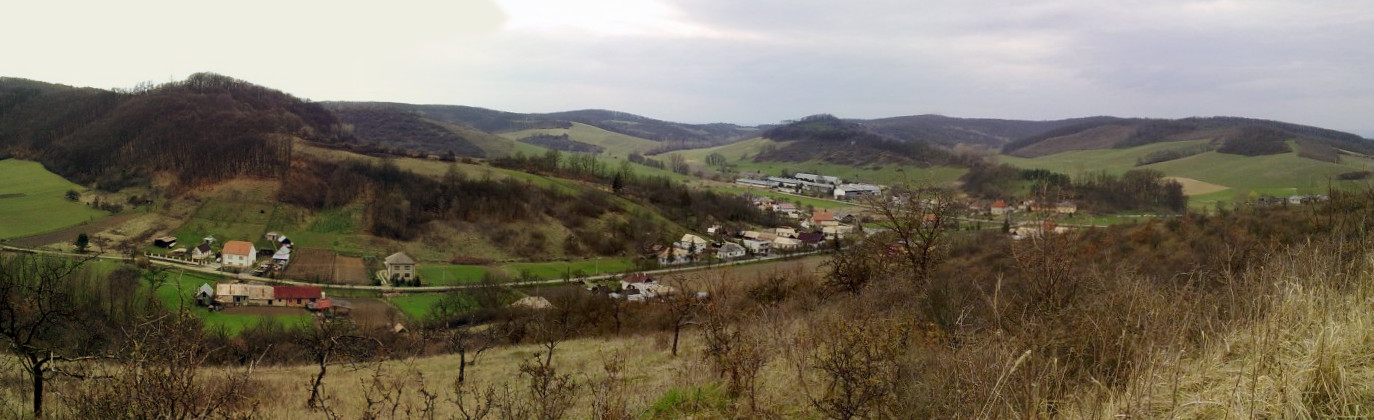
- panorama of Lipovany

- Flag

- Location of Lipovany in the Banská Bystrica Region Location of Lipovany in Slovakia
- Coordinates: 48.22°N 19.71°E
- Country: Slovakia
- Region: Banská Bystrica Region
- District: Lučenec District
- First mentioned: 1238

Area
  - Total: 10.33 km^{2} (3.99 sq mi)
- Elevation: 216 m (709 ft)

Population (2025)
  - Total: 227
- Time zone: UTC+1 (CET)
  - Summer (DST): UTC+2 (CEST)
- Postal code: 985 31
- Area code: +421 47
- Vehicle registration plate (until 2022): LC
- Website: www.lipovany.sk

Lipovany (Hungarian: Romhánypuszta) is a village and municipality in the Lučenec District in the Banská Bystrica Region of Slovakia.

== Geography ==
The municipality lies at an altitude of 216 metres (709 ft) and covers an area of 10.33 km^{2} (3.99 sq mi) (2025).

== Population ==
Population statistic (10 years)
Year	1995	2005	2015	2025
Count	322	291	256	227
Difference		−9.62%	−12.02%	−11.32%

Population statistic
Year	2024	2025
Count	234	227
Difference		−2.99%

It has a population of 227 people (31 December 2025).

=== Ethnicity ===
Census 2021 (1+ %)
Ethnicity	Number	Fraction
Slovak	236	95.93%
Not found out	7	2.84%
Czech	3	1.21%
Total	246	

In year 2021 was 246 people by ethnicity 236 as Slovak, 7 as Not found out, 3 as Czech and 2 as Hungarian.

Note on population: The difference values of population numbers in the table "Population statistic" and in the sections "Ethnicity" & "Religion" is caused by the use of various statistical methods.

=== Religion ===
Census 2021 (1+ %)
Religion	Number	Fraction
Roman Catholic Church	187	76.02%
None	35	14.23%
Not found out	11	4.47%
Evangelical Church	10	4.07%
Greek Catholic Church	3	1.22%
Total	246	

In year 2021 was 246 people by religion 187 from Roman Catholic Church, 35 from None, 11 from Not found out, 10 from Evangelical Church and 3 from Greek Catholic Church.
