= Mikušovce, Lučenec District =

Mikušovce Miksi
- Municipality
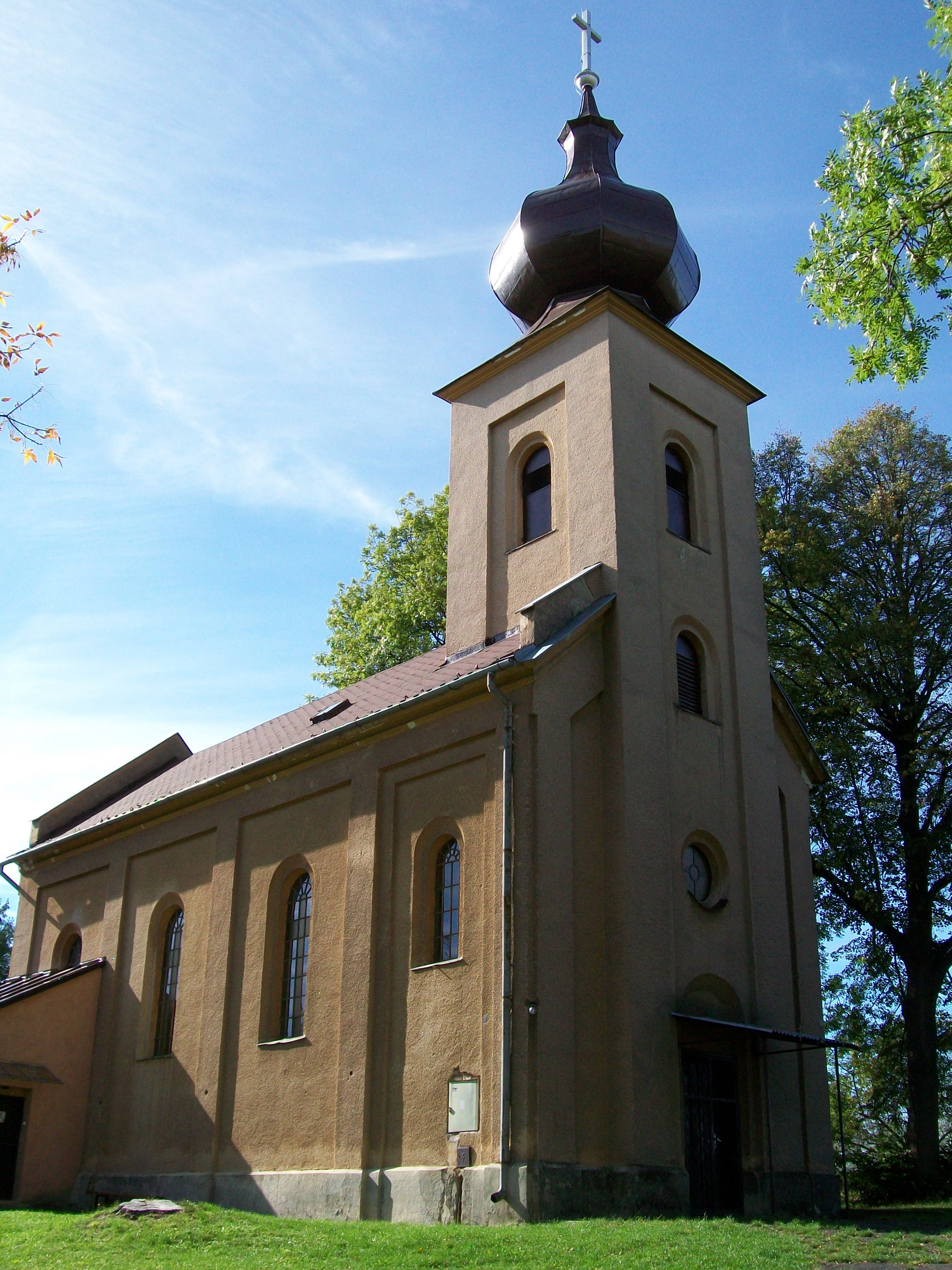
- Roman Catholic church in Mikušovce

- Flag

- Location of Mikušovce in the Banská Bystrica Region Location of Mikušovce in Slovakia
- Coordinates: 48°18′00″N 19°41′00″E
- Country: Slovakia
- Region: Banská Bystrica Region
- District: Lučenec District
- First mentioned: 1370

Area
  - Total: 5.00 km^{2} (1.93 sq mi)
- Elevation: 186 m (610 ft)

Population (2025)
  - Total: 295
- Time zone: UTC+1 (CET)
  - Summer (DST): UTC+2 (CEST)
- Postal code: 984 01
- Area code: +421 47
- Vehicle registration plate (until 2022): LC
- Website: www.mikusovce.eu

Mikušovce (Hungarian: Miksi) is a village and municipality in the Lučenec District in the Banská Bystrica Region of Slovakia.

== Population ==
Population statistic (10 years)
Year	1995	2005	2015	2025
Count	278	275	273	295
Difference		−1.07%	−0.72%	+8.05%

Population statistic
Year	2024	2025
Count	284	295
Difference		+3.87%

It has a population of 295 people (31 December 2025).

=== Ethnicity ===
Census 2021 (1+ %)
Ethnicity	Number	Fraction
Slovak	228	82.9%
Hungarian	44	16%
Not found out	11	4%
Czech	3	1.09%
Total	275	

In year 2021 was 275 people by ethnicity 228 as Slovak, 44 as Hungarian, 11 as Not found out, 3 as Czech, 2 as Other, 1 as Ukrainian, 1 as Romani and 1 as German.

Note on population: The difference values of population numbers in the table "Population statistic" and in the sections "Ethnicity" & "Religion" is caused by the use of various statistical methods.

=== Religion ===
Census 2021 (1+ %)
Religion	Number	Fraction
Roman Catholic Church	176	64%
None	49	17.82%
Evangelical Church	19	6.91%
Baptists Church	19	6.91%
Not found out	7	2.55%
Total	275	

In year 2021 was 275 people by religion 176 from Roman Catholic Church, 49 from None, 19 from Evangelical Church, 19 from Baptists Church, 7 from Not found out, 1 from Eastern Orthodox Church, 1 from Greek Catholic Church, 1 from United Methodist Church, 1 from Buddhism and 1 from Apostolic Church.
