= Nové Hony =

Nové Hony Kétkeresztúr
- Municipality
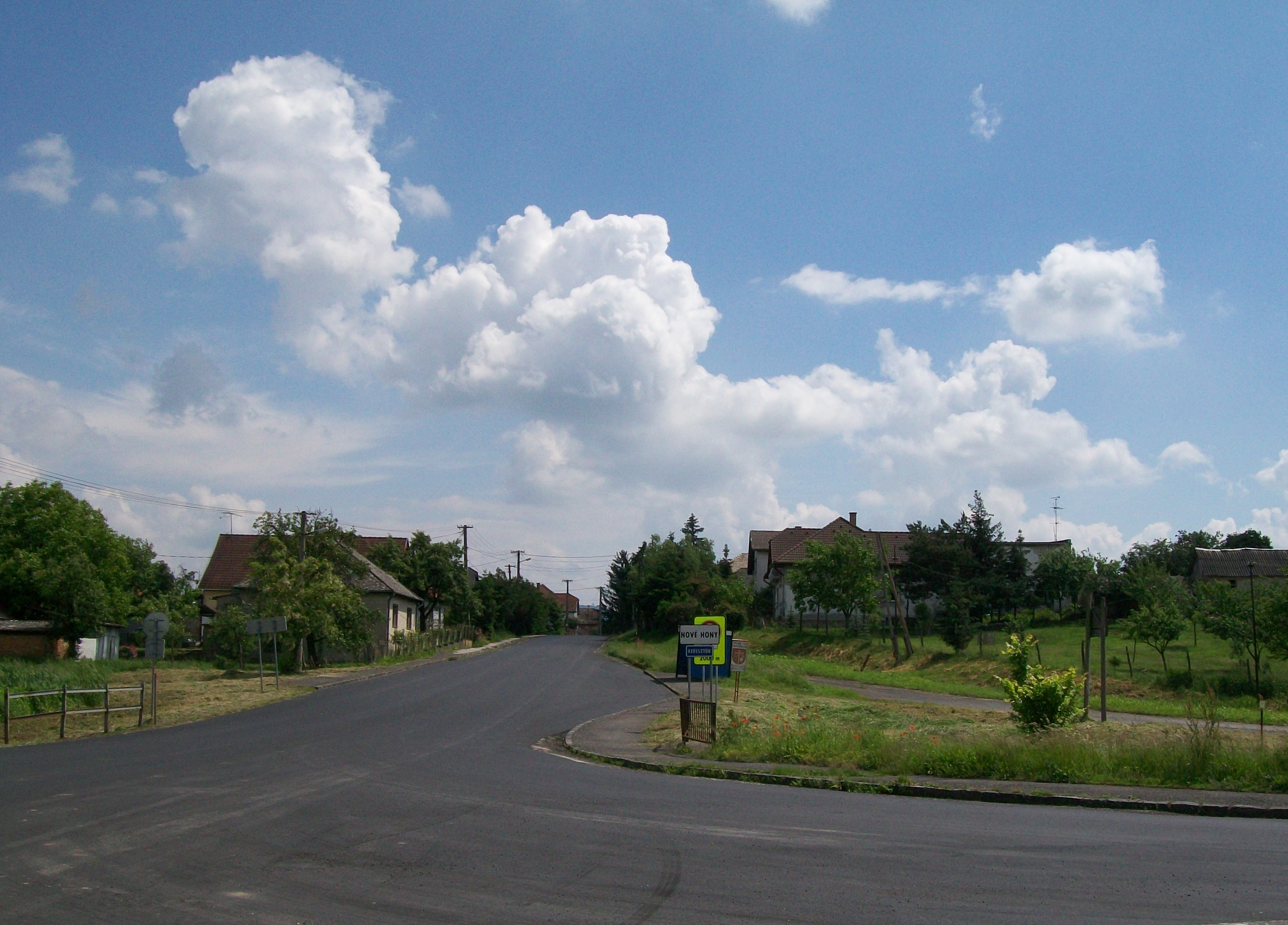

- Flag

- Location of Nové Hony in the Banská Bystrica Region Location of Nové Hony in Slovakia
- Coordinates: 48.36°N 19.82°E
- Country: Slovakia
- Region: Banská Bystrica Region
- District: Lučenec District
- First mentioned: 1332

Area
  - Total: 16.64 km^{2} (6.42 sq mi)
- Elevation: 211 m (692 ft)

Population (2025)
  - Total: 187
- Time zone: UTC+1 (CET)
  - Summer (DST): UTC+2 (CEST)
- Postal code: 985 42
- Area code: +421 47
- Vehicle registration plate (until 2022): LC
- Website: www.novehony.sk

Nové Hony (Hungarian: Kétkeresztúr) is a village and municipality in Lučenec District in the Banská Bystrica Region of central Slovakia.

== History ==
The village was first mentioned in historical records in 1332.

== Geography ==
The municipality lies at an altitude of 211 metres (692 ft) and covers an area of 16.64 km^{2} (6.42 sq mi) (2025).

== Population ==
Population statistic (10 years)
Year	1995	2005	2015	2025
Count	188	186	181	187
Difference		−1.06%	−2.68%	+3.31%

Population statistic
Year	2024	2025
Count	178	187
Difference		+5.05%

It has a population of 187 people (31 December 2025).

=== Ethnicity ===
Census 2021 (1+ %)
Ethnicity	Number	Fraction
Slovak	153	85.47%
Hungarian	24	13.4%
Not found out	4	2.23%
Total	179	

In year 2021 was 179 people by ethnicity 153 as Slovak, 24 as Hungarian, 4 as Not found out, 1 as Czech and 1 as Other.

Note on population: The difference values of population numbers in the table "Population statistic" and in the sections "Ethnicity" & "Religion" is caused by the use of various statistical methods.

=== Religion ===
Census 2021 (1+ %)
Religion	Number	Fraction
Roman Catholic Church	112	62.57%
None	35	19.55%
Not found out	12	6.7%
Evangelical Church	11	6.15%
Calvinist Church	6	3.35%
Total	179	

In year 2021 was 179 people by religion 112 from Roman Catholic Church, 35 from None, 12 from Not found out, 11 from Evangelical Church, 6 from Calvinist Church, 1 from Paganism and natural spirituality, 1 from Christian Congregations in Slovakia and 1 from Other.
