= Šávoľ =

Šávoľ Füleksávoly
- Municipality
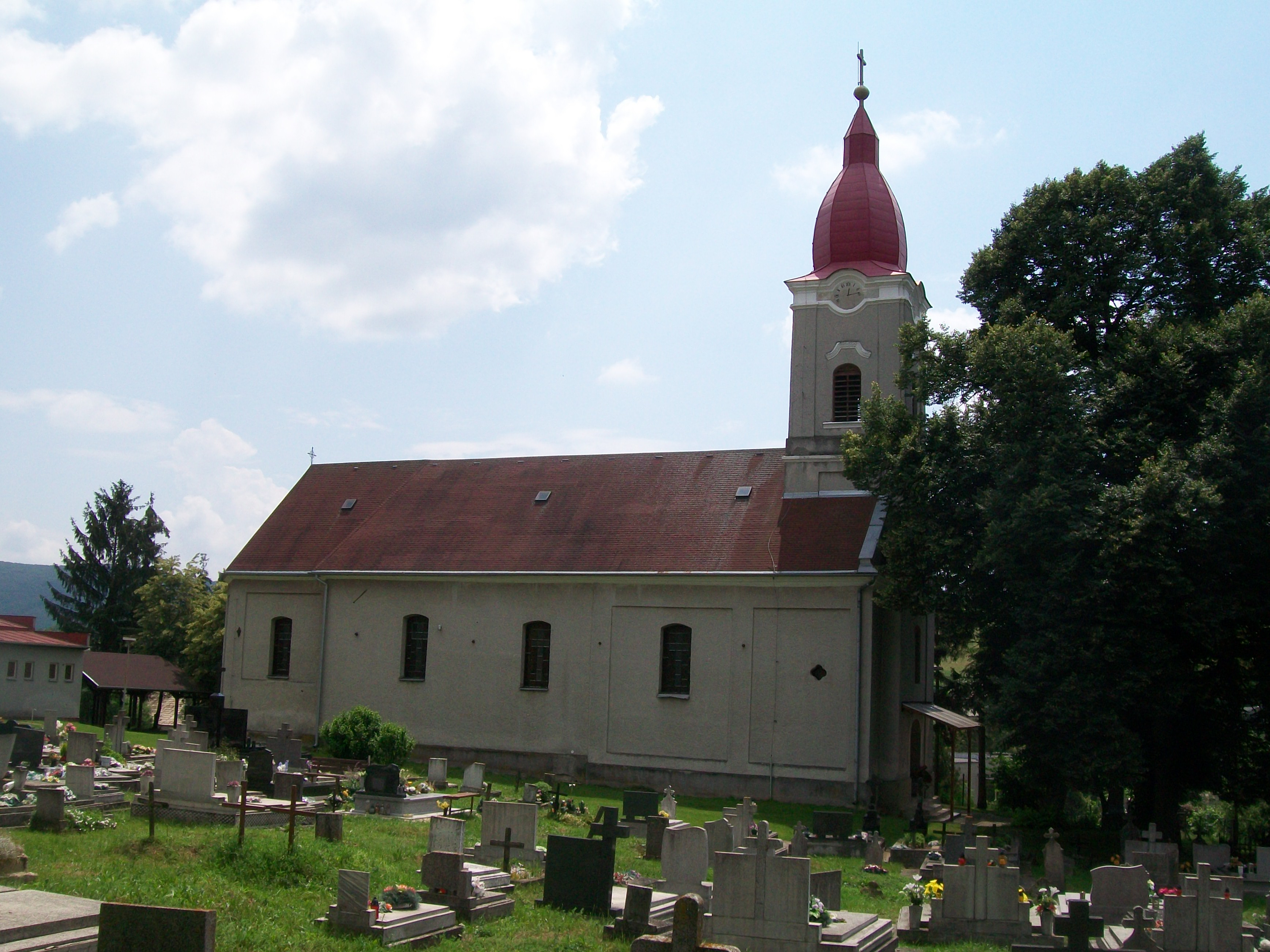
- Roman Catholic church in Šávoľ

- Flag Coat of arms

- Location of Šávoľ in the Banská Bystrica Region Location of Šávoľ in Slovakia
- Coordinates: 48.30°N 19.82°E
- Country: Slovakia
- Region: Banská Bystrica Region
- District: Lučenec District
- First mentioned: 1384

Area
  - Total: 10.86 km^{2} (4.19 sq mi)
- Elevation: 198 m (650 ft)

Population (2025)
  - Total: 607
- Time zone: UTC+1 (CET)
  - Summer (DST): UTC+2 (CEST)
- Postal code: 985 41
- Area code: +421 47
- Vehicle registration plate (until 2022): LC
- Website: www.obecsavol.sk

Šávoľ (Hungarian: Füleksávoly) is a village and municipality in the Lučenec District in the Banská Bystrica Region of Slovakia.

== Geography ==
The municipality lies at an altitude of 198 metres (650 ft) and covers an area of 10.86 km^{2} (4.19 sq mi) (2025).

== Population ==
Population statistic (10 years)
Year	1995	2005	2015	2025
Count	545	576	556	607
Difference		+5.68%	−3.47%	+9.17%

Population statistic
Year	2024	2025
Count	596	607
Difference		+1.84%

It has a population of 607 people (31 December 2025).

=== Ethnicity ===
Census 2021 (1+ %)
Ethnicity	Number	Fraction
Hungarian	420	71.42%
Slovak	153	26.02%
Romani	119	20.23%
Not found out	46	7.82%
Total	588	

In year 2021 was 588 people by ethnicity 420 as Hungarian, 153 as Slovak, 119 as Romani, 46 as Not found out, 3 as Other and 1 as Czech.

Note on population: The difference values of population numbers in the table "Population statistic" and in the sections "Ethnicity" & "Religion" is caused by the use of various statistical methods.

=== Religion ===
Census 2021 (1+ %)
Religion	Number	Fraction
Roman Catholic Church	490	83.33%
None	56	9.52%
Not found out	32	5.44%
Total	588	

In year 2021 was 588 people by religion 490 from Roman Catholic Church, 56 from None, 32 from Not found out, 5 from Evangelical Church, 2 from Calvinist Church, 1 from Eastern Orthodox Church, 1 from Jehovah's Witnesses and 1 from Christian Congregations in Slovakia.
