= Gregorova Vieska =

Gregorova Vieska Gergelyfalva
- Municipality
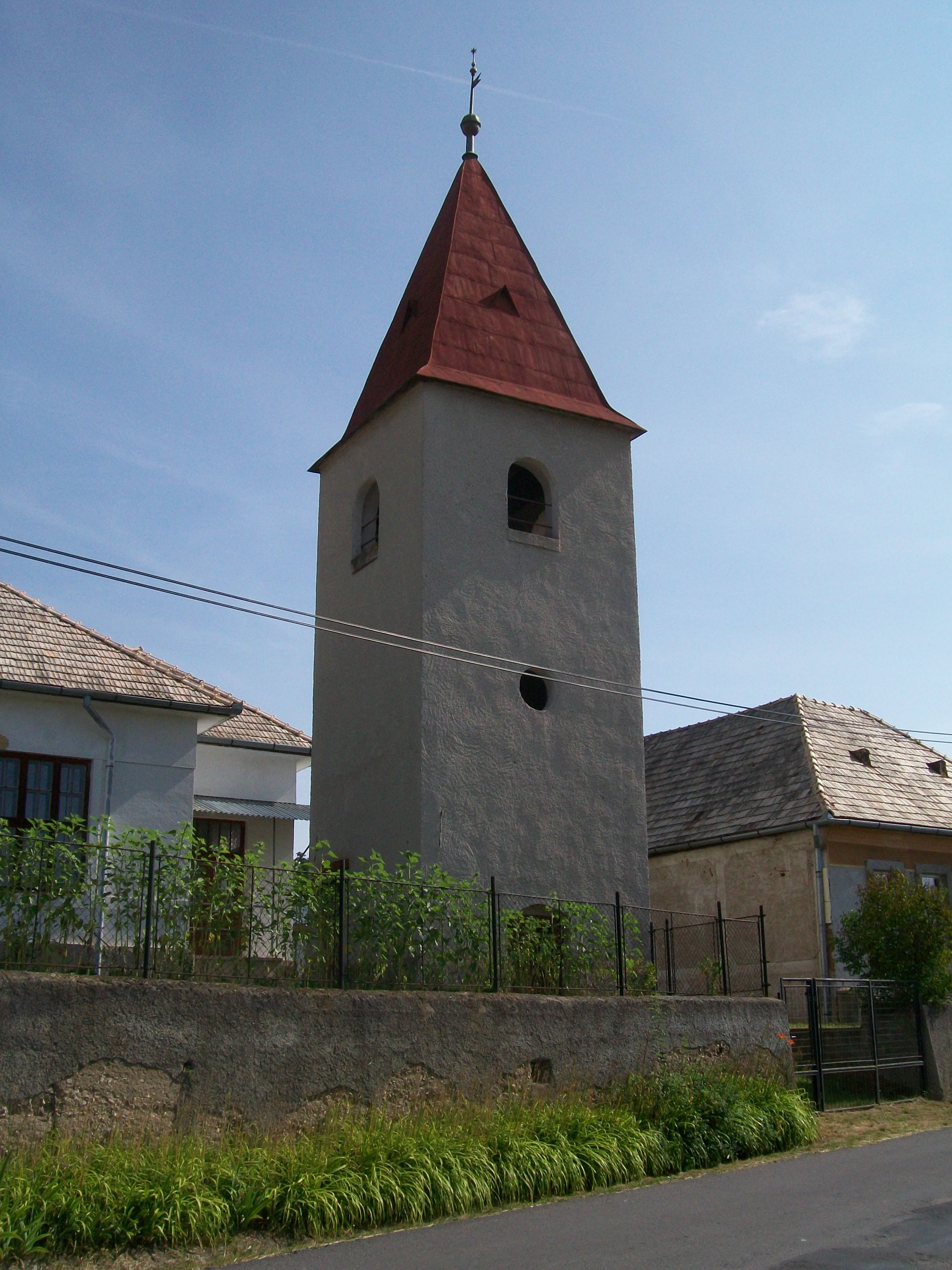
- Belfry

- Flag

- Location of Gregorova Vieska in the Banská Bystrica Region Location of Gregorova Vieska in Slovakia
- Coordinates: 48.38°N 19.58°E
- Country: Slovakia
- Region: Banská Bystrica Region
- District: Lučenec District
- First mentioned: 1393

Area
  - Total: 4.79 km^{2} (1.85 sq mi)
- Elevation: 267 m (876 ft)

Population (2025)
  - Total: 138
- Time zone: UTC+1 (CET)
  - Summer (DST): UTC+2 (CEST)
- Postal code: 985 56
- Area code: +421 47
- Vehicle registration plate (until 2022): LC
- Website: www.gregorovavieska.sk

Gregorova Vieska (Hungarian: Gergelyfalva) is a village and municipality in the Lučenec District in the Banská Bystrica Region of Slovakia.

== Geography ==
The municipality lies at an altitude of 267 metres (876 ft) and covers an area of 4.79 km^{2} (1.85 sq mi) (2025).

== History ==
In historical records, the village was first mentioned in 1393 (Gergurfalua). It belonged to Divín castle.

== Population ==
Population statistic (10 years)
Year	1995	2005	2015	2025
Count	133	145	144	138
Difference		+9.02%	−0.68%	−4.16%

Population statistic
Year	2024	2025
Count	140	138
Difference		−1.42%

It has a population of 138 people (31 December 2025).

=== Ethnicity ===
Census 2021 (1+%)
Ethnicity	Number	Fraction
Slovak	139	96.52%
Not found out	4	2.77%
Romani	3	2.08%
Hungarian	3	2.08%
Total	144	

In year 2021 was 144 people by ethnicity 139 as Slovak, 4 as Not found out, 3 as Romani and 3 as Hungarian.

Note on population: The difference values of population numbers in the table "Population statistic" and in the sections "Ethnicity" & "Religion" is caused by the use of various statistical methods.

=== Religion ===
Census 2021 (1+%)
Religion	Number	Fraction
Roman Catholic Church	71	49.31%
None	36	25%
Evangelical Church	32	22.22%
Not found out	3	2.08%
Greek Catholic Church	2	1.39%
Total	144	

In year 2021 was 144 people by religion 71 from Roman Catholic Church, 36 from None, 32 from Evangelical Church, 3 from Not found out and 2 from Greek Catholic Church.

== Genealogical resources ==
The records for genealogical research are available at the state archive "Statny Archiv in Banska Bystrica, Slovakia"

- Roman Catholic church records (births/marriages/deaths): 1800-1895 (parish B)
- Lutheran church records (births/marriages/deaths): 1712-1896 (parish B)

== See also ==
- List of municipalities and towns in Slovakia
