= Šíd =

Village and municipality in Slovakia

Šíd Gömörsíd
- Municipality
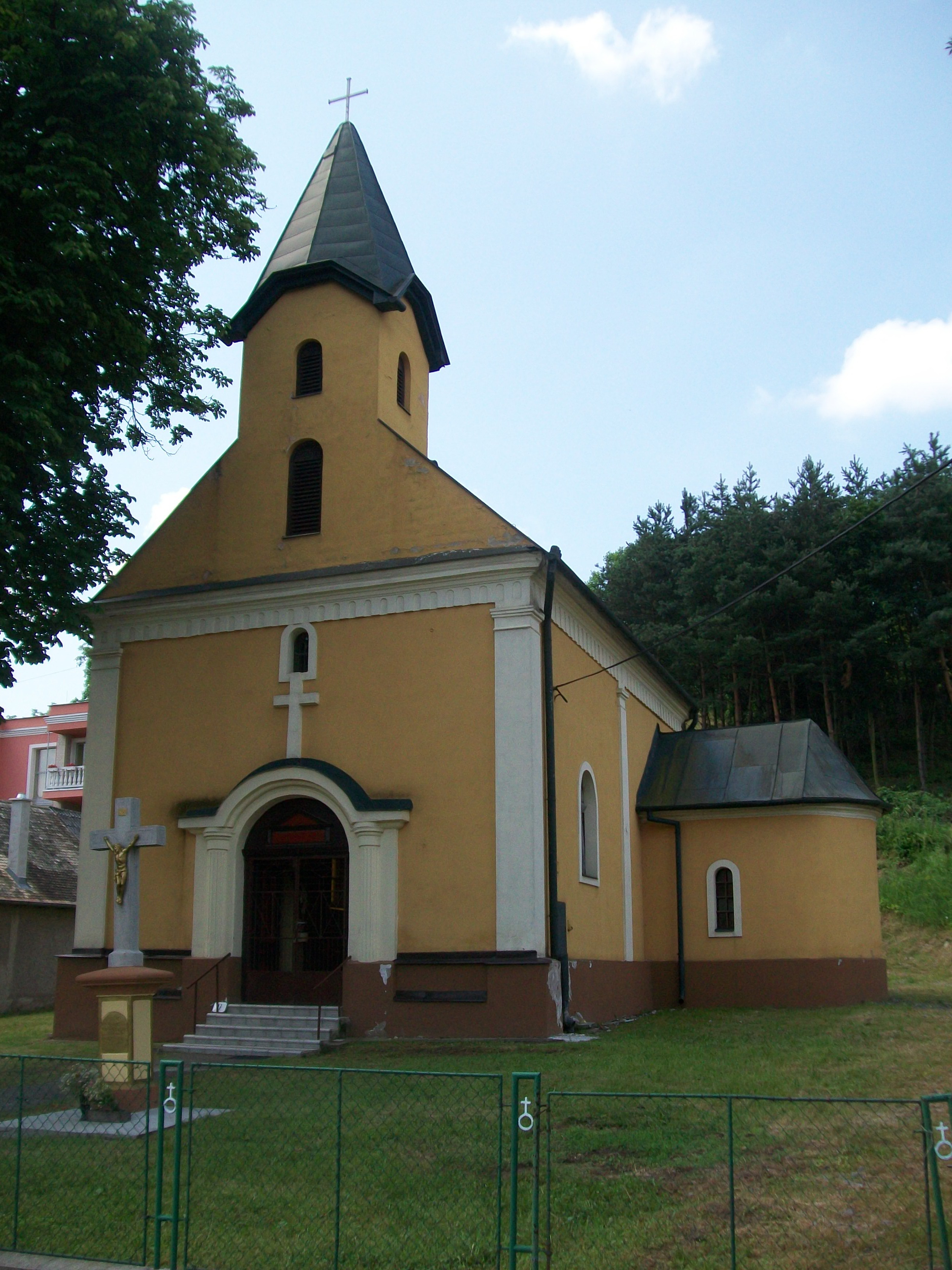
- Roman Catholic church in Šíd

- Flag

- Location of Šíd in the Banská Bystrica Region Location of Šíd in Slovakia
- Coordinates: 48.27°N 19.88°E
- Country: Slovakia
- Region: Banská Bystrica Region
- District: Lučenec District
- First mentioned: 1365

Area
  - Total: 15.23 km^{2} (5.88 sq mi)
- Elevation: 216 m (709 ft)

Population (2025)
  - Total: 1,437
- Time zone: UTC+1 (CET)
  - Summer (DST): UTC+2 (CEST)
- Postal code: 986 01
- Area code: +421 47
- Vehicle registration plate (until 2022): LC
- Website: www.obec-sid.sk

Šíd (Hungarian: Gömörsíd) is a village and municipality in the Lučenec District in the Banská Bystrica Region of Slovakia. As of December 2024, the population is 1,431 people.

== Geography ==
The municipality lies at an altitude of 216 metres (709 ft) and covers an area of 15.23 km^{2} (5.88 sq mi) (2025).

== Population ==
Population statistic (10 years)
Year	1995	2005	2015	2025
Count	1111	1128	1286	1437
Difference		+1.53%	+14.00%	+11.74%

Population statistic
Year	2024	2025
Count	1431	1437
Difference		+0.41%

It has a population of 1437 people (31 December 2025).

=== Ethnicity ===
Census 2021 (1+ %)
Ethnicity	Number	Fraction
Hungarian	814	61.24%
Romani	514	38.67%
Slovak	210	15.8%
Not found out	171	12.86%
Total	1329	

In year 2021 was 1329 people by ethnicity 814 as Hungarian, 514 as Romani, 210 as Slovak, 171 as Not found out, 6 as Serbian, 2 as Czech, 2 as Romanian and 1 as English.

Note on population: The difference values of population numbers in the table "Population statistic" and in the sections "Ethnicity" & "Religion" is caused by the use of various statistical methods.

=== Religion ===
Census 2021 (1+ %)
Religion	Number	Fraction
Roman Catholic Church	1031	77.58%
Not found out	155	11.66%
None	112	8.43%
Total	1329	

In year 2021 was 1329 people by religion 1031 from Roman Catholic Church, 155 from Not found out, 112 from None, 9 from Calvinist Church, 9 from Evangelical Church, 7 from Greek Catholic Church, 2 from Eastern Orthodox Church, 1 from Jehovah's Witnesses, 1 from Other, 1 from United Methodist Church and 1 from Baptists Church.
