= Kotmanová =

Kotmanová Kotmány
- Municipality
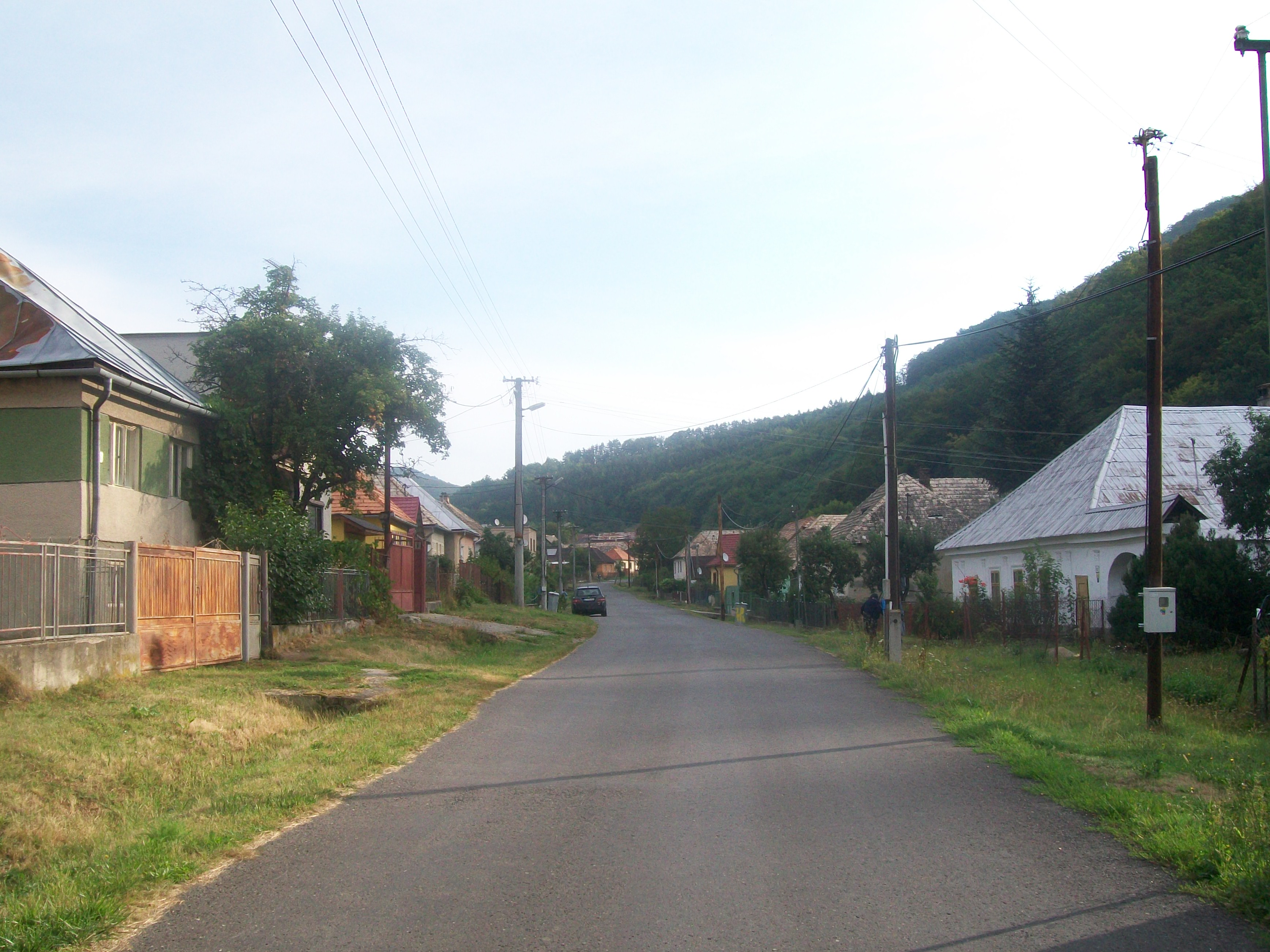

- Flag

- Location of Kotmanová in the Banská Bystrica Region Location of Kotmanová in Slovakia
- Coordinates: 48.48°N 19.58°E
- Country: Slovakia
- Region: Banská Bystrica Region
- District: Lučenec District
- First mentioned: 1393

Area
  - Total: 16.78 km^{2} (6.48 sq mi)
- Elevation: 301 m (988 ft)

Population (2025)
  - Total: 256
- Time zone: UTC+1 (CET)
  - Summer (DST): UTC+2 (CEST)
- Postal code: 985 53
- Area code: +421 47
- Vehicle registration plate (until 2022): LC
- Website: www.kotmanova.sk

Kotmanová (Hungarian: Kotmány) is a village and municipality in the Lučenec District in the Banská Bystrica Region of Slovakia.

== Geography ==
The municipality lies at an altitude of 301 metres (988 ft) and covers an area of 16.78 km^{2} (6.48 sq mi) (2025).

== Population ==
Population statistic (10 years)
| Year | 1995 | 2005 | 2015 | 2025 |
|---|---|---|---|---|
| Count | 376 | 354 | 314 | 256 |
| Difference | | −5.85% | −11.29% | −18.47% |

Population statistic
| Year | 2024 | 2025 |
|---|---|---|
| Count | 259 | 256 |
| Difference | | −1.15% |

It has a population of 256 people (31 December 2025).

=== Ethnicity ===
Census 2021 (1+ %)
| Ethnicity | Number | Fraction |
|---|---|---|
| Slovak | 272 | 97.49% |
| Not found out | 5 | 1.79% |
| Total | 279 | |

In year 2021 was 279 people by ethnicity 272 as Slovak, 5 as Not found out, 1 as Czech and 1 as Hungarian.

Note on population: The difference values of population numbers in the table "Population statistic" and in the sections "Ethnicity" & "Religion" is caused by the use of various statistical methods.

=== Religion ===
Census 2021 (1+ %)
| Religion | Number | Fraction |
|---|---|---|
| Evangelical Church | 132 | 47.31% |
| Roman Catholic Church | 85 | 30.47% |
| None | 53 | 19% |
| Not found out | 5 | 1.79% |
| Total | 279 | |

In year 2021 was 279 people by religion 132 from Evangelical Church, 85 from Roman Catholic Church, 53 from None, 5 from Not found out, 1 from Calvinist Church, 1 from Eastern Orthodox Church, 1 from Christian Congregations in Slovakia and 1 from Buddhism.
