= Panické Dravce =

Panické Dravce Panyidaróc
- Municipality
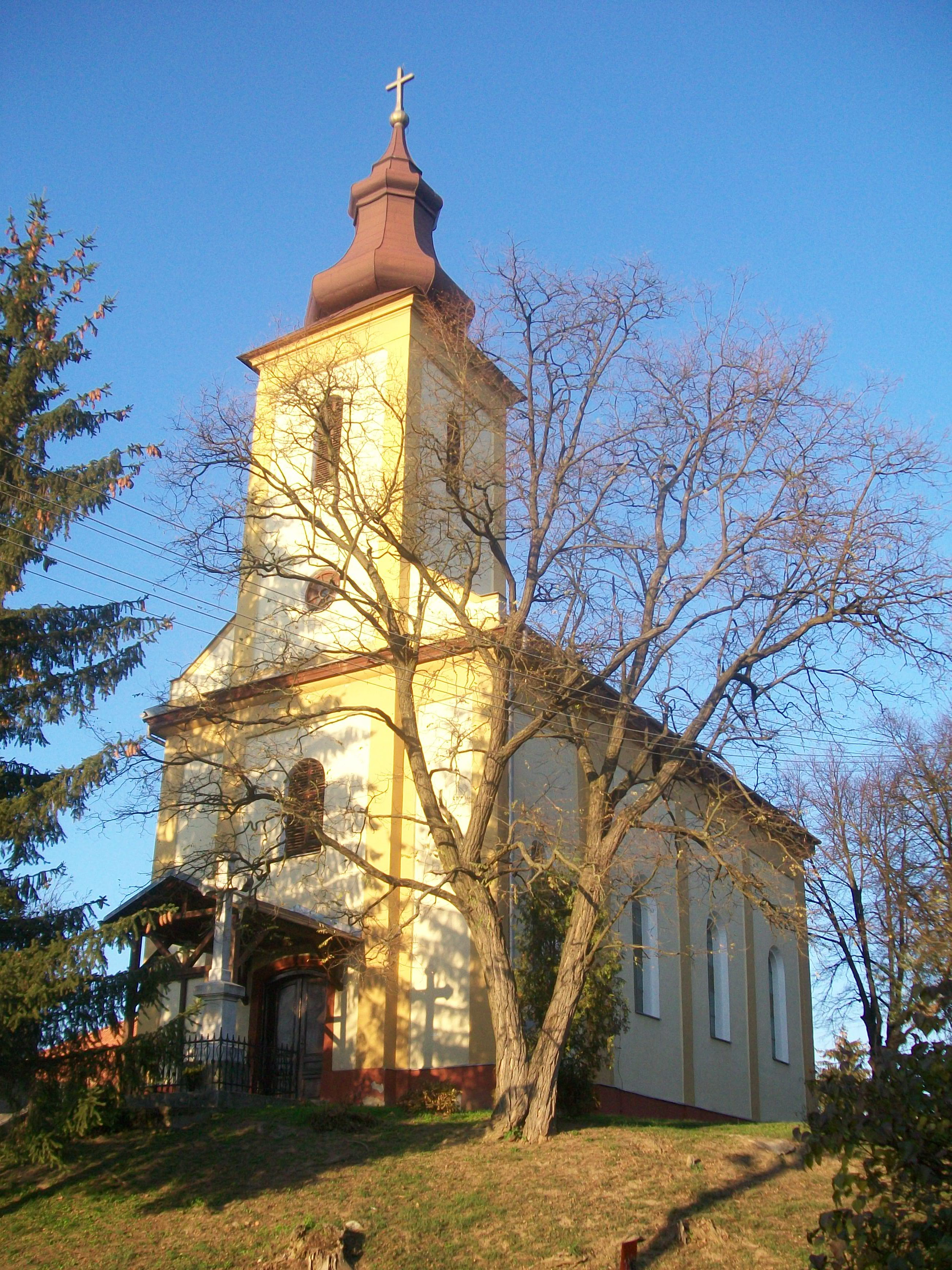

- Flag

- Location of Panické Dravce in the Banská Bystrica Region Location of Panické Dravce in Slovakia
- Coordinates: 48.28°N 19.67°E
- Country: Slovakia
- Region: Banská Bystrica Region
- District: Lučenec District
- First mentioned: 1573

Area
  - Total: 11.07 km^{2} (4.27 sq mi)
- Elevation: 185 m (607 ft)

Population (2025)
  - Total: 746
- Time zone: UTC+1 (CET)
  - Summer (DST): UTC+2 (CEST)
- Postal code: 985 32
- Area code: +421 47
- Vehicle registration plate (until 2022): LC
- Website: www.panickedravce.sk

Panické Dravce (Hungarian: Panyidaróc) is a village and municipality in the Lučenec District in the Banská Bystrica Region of Slovakia.

== Geography ==
The municipality lies at an altitude of 185 metres (607 ft) and covers an area of 11.07 km^{2} (4.27 sq mi) (2025).

== Population ==
Population statistic (10 years)
Year	1995	2005	2015	2025
Count	713	740	744	746
Difference		+3.78%	+0.54%	+0.26%

Population statistic
Year	2024	2025
Count	738	746
Difference		+1.08%

It has a population of 746 people (31 December 2025).

=== Ethnicity ===
Census 2021 (1+ %)
Ethnicity	Number	Fraction
Slovak	519	69.85%
Hungarian	226	30.41%
Not found out	38	5.11%
Total	743	

In year 2021 was 743 people by ethnicity 519 as Slovak, 226 as Hungarian, 38 as Not found out, 6 as Romani, 1 as Czech, 1 as Irish, 1 as Romanian, 1 as Austrian, 1 as Other and 1 as English.

Note on population: The difference values of population numbers in the table "Population statistic" and in the sections "Ethnicity" & "Religion" is caused by the use of various statistical methods.

=== Religion ===
Census 2021 (1+ %)
Religion	Number	Fraction
Roman Catholic Church	454	61.1%
None	151	20.32%
Not found out	42	5.65%
Evangelical Church	40	5.38%
Baptists Church	37	4.98%
Total	743	

In year 2021 was 743 people by religion 454 from Roman Catholic Church, 151 from None, 42 from Not found out, 40 from Evangelical Church, 37 from Baptists Church, 6 from Christian Congregations in Slovakia, 2 from Other and not ascertained christian church, 2 from Other, 2 from Seventh-day Adventist Church, 2 from Ad hoc movements, 1 from Calvinist Church, 1 from Eastern Orthodox Church, 1 from Church of Jesus Christ of Latter-day Saints, 1 from Buddhism and 1 from Apostolic Church.
