= Lupoč =

Lupoč Gácslápos
- Municipality
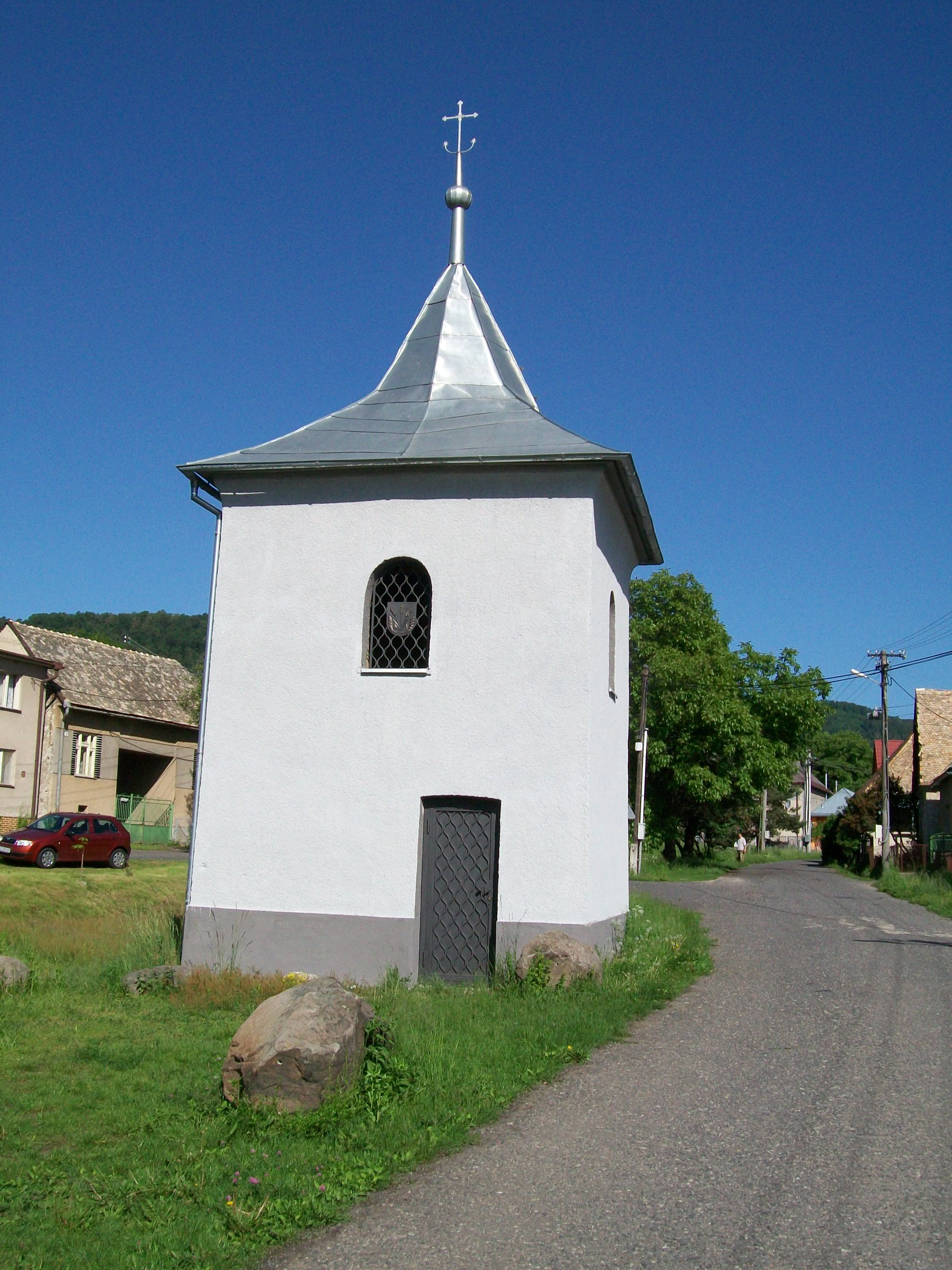

- Flag

- Location of Lupoč in the Banská Bystrica Region Location of Lupoč in Slovakia
- Coordinates: 48.37°N 19.55°E
- Country: Slovakia
- Region: Banská Bystrica Region
- District: Lučenec District
- First mentioned: 1499

Area
  - Total: 9.34 km^{2} (3.61 sq mi)
- Elevation: 298 m (978 ft)

Population (2025)
  - Total: 230
- Time zone: UTC+1 (CET)
  - Summer (DST): UTC+2 (CEST)
- Postal code: 985 11
- Area code: +421 47
- Vehicle registration plate (until 2022): LC
- Website: www.lupoc.sk

Lupoč (Hungarian: Gácslápos) is a village and municipality in the Lučenec District in the Banská Bystrica Region of Slovakia.

== Geography ==
The municipality lies at an altitude of 298 metres (978 ft) and covers an area of 9.34 km^{2} (3.61 sq mi) (2025).

== Population ==
Population statistic (10 years)
Year	1995	2005	2015	2025
Count	200	242	237	230
Difference		+21%	−2.06%	−2.95%

Population statistic
Year	2024	2025
Count	234	230
Difference		−1.70%

It has a population of 230 people (31 December 2025).

=== Ethnicity ===
Census 2021 (1+ %)
Ethnicity	Number	Fraction
Slovak	198	96.11%
Romani	7	3.39%
Not found out	7	3.39%
Hungarian	3	1.45%
Total	206	

In year 2021 was 206 people by ethnicity 198 as Slovak, 7 as Romani, 7 as Not found out, 3 as Hungarian, 2 as Polish, 2 as German, 1 as Czech and 1 as Rusyn.

Note on population: The difference values of population numbers in the table "Population statistic" and in the sections "Ethnicity" & "Religion" is caused by the use of various statistical methods.

=== Religion ===
Census 2021 (1+ %)
Religion	Number	Fraction
Roman Catholic Church	100	48.54%
Evangelical Church	47	22.82%
None	43	20.87%
Not found out	8	3.88%
Greek Catholic Church	3	1.46%
Total	206	

In year 2021 was 206 people by religion 100 from Roman Catholic Church, 47 from Evangelical Church, 43 from None, 8 from Not found out, 3 from Greek Catholic Church, 2 from Ad hoc movements, 1 from Eastern Orthodox Church, 1 from Other and not ascertained christian church and 1 from Buddhism.
