= Ľuboreč =

Ľuboreč Nagylibercse
- Municipality
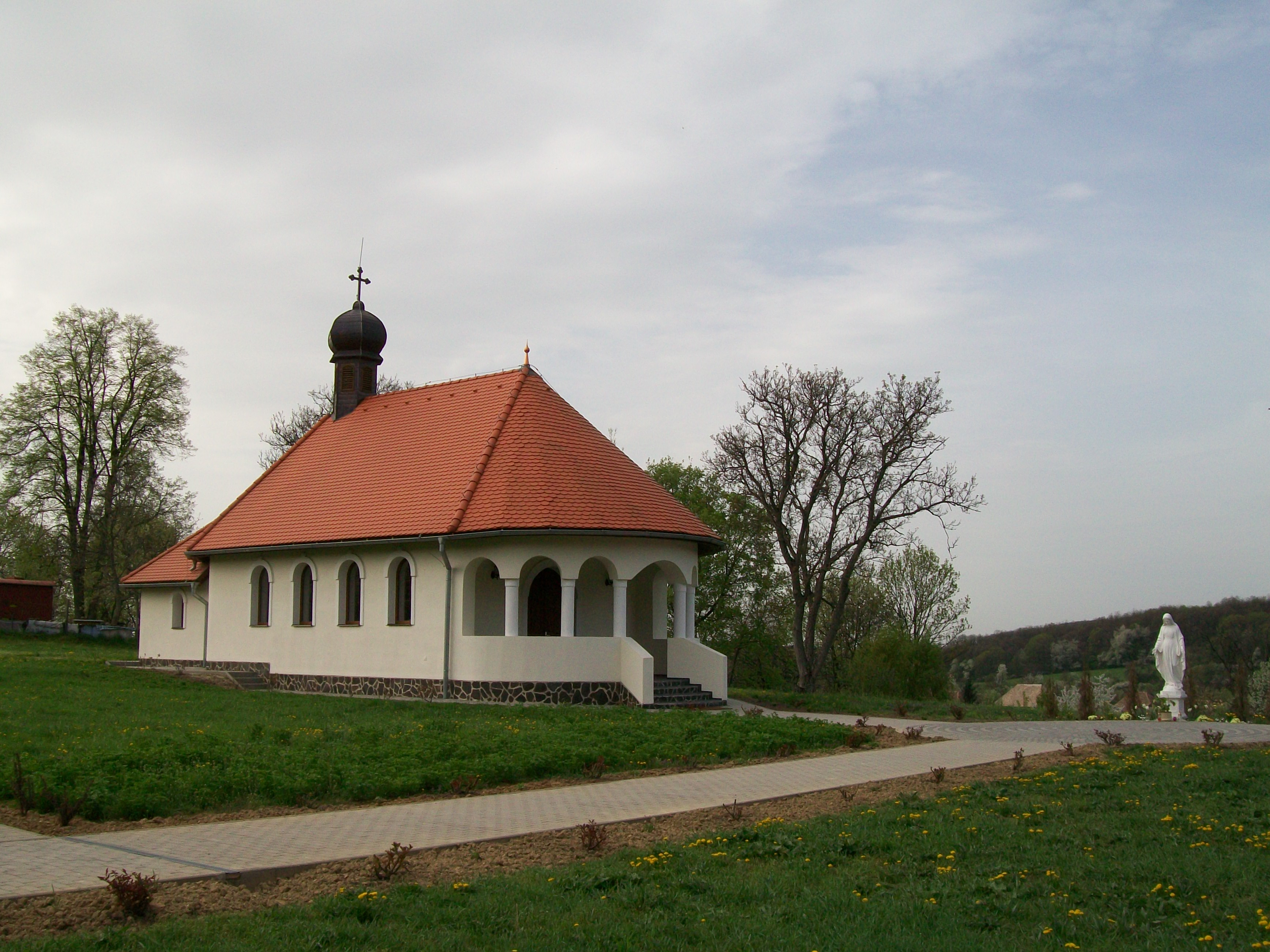
- Roman Catholic church

- Flag

- Location of Ľuboreč in the Banská Bystrica Region Location of Ľuboreč in Slovakia
- Coordinates: 48.32°N 19.53°E
- Country: Slovakia
- Region: Banská Bystrica Region
- District: Lučenec District
- First mentioned: 1271

Area
  - Total: 31.66 km^{2} (12.22 sq mi)
- Elevation: 252 m (827 ft)

Population (2025)
  - Total: 345
- Time zone: UTC+1 (CET)
  - Summer (DST): UTC+2 (CEST)
- Postal code: 985 11
- Area code: +421 47
- Vehicle registration plate (until 2022): LC
- Website: www.luborec.sk

Ľuboreč (Hungarian: Nagylibercse) is a village and municipality in the Lučenec District in the Banská Bystrica Region of Slovakia.

== Geography ==
The municipality lies at an altitude of 252 metres (827 ft) and covers an area of 31.66 km^{2} (12.22 sq mi) (2025).

== Population ==
Population statistic (10 years)
Year	1995	2005	2015	2025
Count	266	303	340	345
Difference		+13.90%	+12.21%	+1.47%

Population statistic
Year	2024	2025
Count	344	345
Difference		+0.29%

It has a population of 345 people (31 December 2025).

=== Ethnicity ===
Census 2021 (1+ %)
Ethnicity	Number	Fraction
Slovak	330	94.82%
Romani	10	2.87%
Not found out	10	2.87%
Hungarian	5	1.43%
Total	348	

In year 2021 was 348 people by ethnicity 330 as Slovak, 10 as Romani, 10 as Not found out, 5 as Hungarian, 3 as Czech, 1 as Russian and 1 as English.

Note on population: The difference values of population numbers in the table "Population statistic" and in the sections "Ethnicity" & "Religion" is caused by the use of various statistical methods.

=== Religion ===
Census 2021 (1+ %)
Religion	Number	Fraction
Roman Catholic Church	138	39.66%
None	96	27.59%
Evangelical Church	89	25.57%
Not found out	14	4.02%
Total	348	

In year 2021 was 348 people by religion 138 from Roman Catholic Church, 96 from None, 89 from Evangelical Church, 14 from Not found out, 3 from Christian Congregations in Slovakia, 2 from Other, 2 from Greek Catholic Church, 2 from Ad hoc movements, 1 from Eastern Orthodox Church and 1 from Seventh-day Adventist Church.
