= Lučenec District =

Coordinates: 48°19′48″N 19°39′49″E

- District
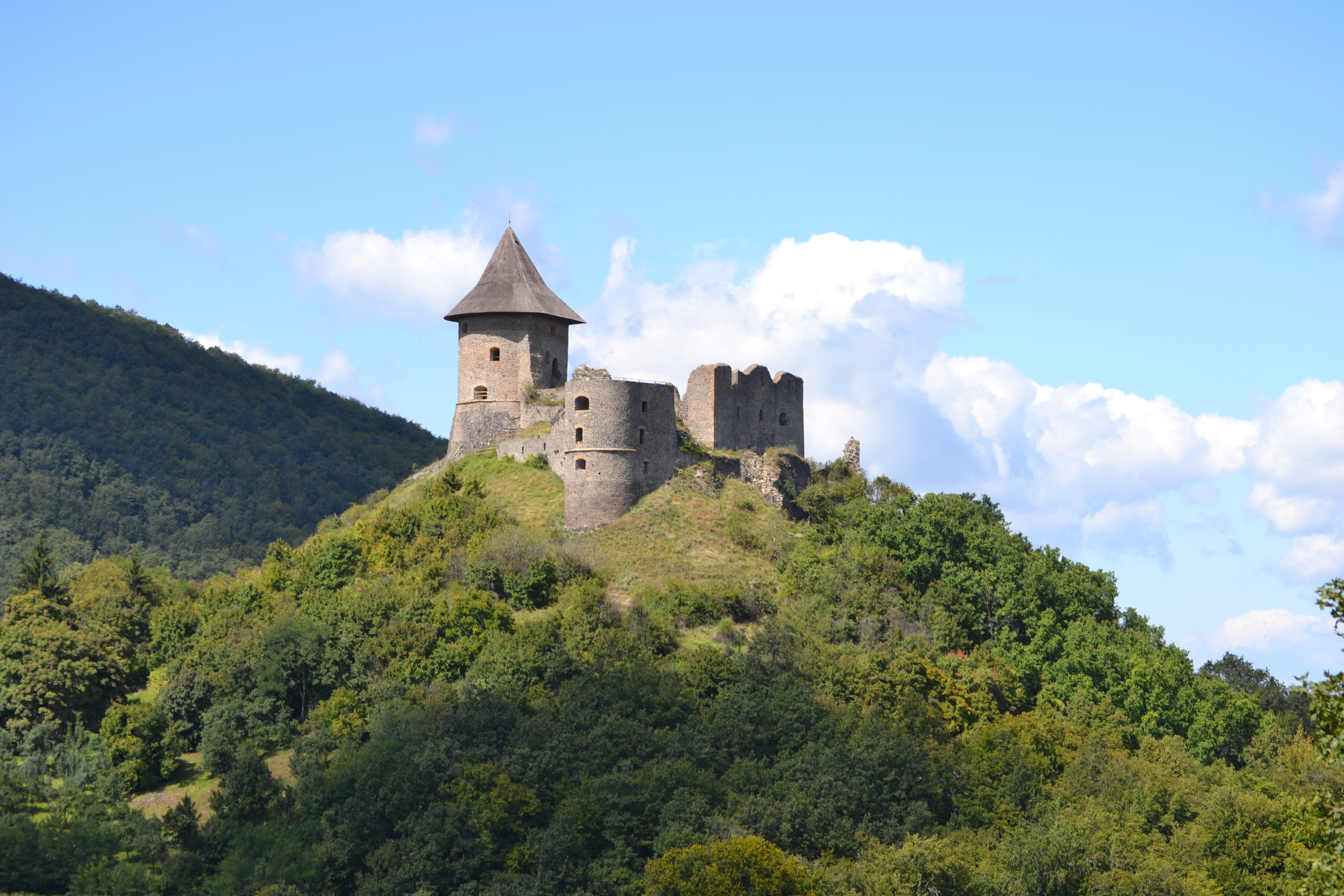
- Country: Slovakia
- Region (kraj): Banská Bystrica Region
- Seat: Lučenec

Area
  - Total: 825.55 km^{2} (318.75 sq mi)

Population (2025)
  - Total: 68,259
- Time zone: UTC+1 (CET)
  - Summer (DST): UTC+2 (CEST)
- Telephone prefix: 047
- Vehicle registration plate (until 2022): LC
- Municipalities: 57

Lučenec District (Slovak: okres Lučenec) is a district in the Banská Bystrica Region of south-central Slovakia. Until 1918, most of the district belonged to the Novohrad county, with a small area around the villages of Šíd, Čamovce and Šurice in the east belonging to the Gemer a Malohont county.

The district is situated in the Southern Slovak Basin, in the broad valley of the Ipeľ River. The two towns—Lučenec and Fiľakovo—comprise nearly 54% of the population of the district, the remainder living in the 55 surrounding villages.

The district lies on the E571 route (Route 50 in Slovak numbering) from Bratislava to Košice, and on one of the train lines connecting the two cities. Train services also run to Budapest via Fiľakovo. There is a small aerodrome at Boľkovce.

The main industries are food processing and building materials.

== Population ==
Population statistic (10 years)
Year	1995	2005	2015	2025
Count	73,537	73,343	74,106	68,259
Difference		−0.26%	+1.04%	−7.89%

Population statistic
Year	2024	2025
Count	68,623	68,259
Difference		−0.53%

It has a population of 68,259 people (31 December 2025).

Historical population
Year	Pop.	±%
1970	68,249	—
1980	71,461	+4.7%
1991	73,337	+2.6%
2001	73,301	−0.0%
2011	74,861	+2.1%
2021	70,422	−5.9%
Source: Statistical Office of the Slovak Republic

=== Ethnicity ===
Census 2021 (1+%)
Ethnicity	Number	Fraction
Slovak	48,274	63.79%
Hungarian	17,943	23.71%
Not found out	5136	6.78%
Romani	3366	4.44%
Total	75,673	

In year 2021 was 75,673 people by ethnicity 48,274 as Slovak, 17,943 as Hungarian, 5136 as Not found out, 3366 as Romani, 323 as Czech, 158 as Other, 62 as German, 53 as Russian, 51 as Ukrainian, 35 as Turkish, 33 as Polish, 32 as Rusyn, 23 as Chinese, 22 as Italian, 22 as English, 20 as Austrian, 20 as Albanian, 16 as Romanian, 13 as Serbian, 13 as Bulgarian, 12 as Jewish, 11 as Vietnamese, 9 as Irish, 8 as Moravian, 6 as Greek, 6 as French, 3 as Croatian, 1 as Silesian, 1 as Korean and 1 as Canadian.

Note on population: The difference values of population numbers in the table "Population statistic" and in the sections "Ethnicity" & "Religion" is caused by the use of various statistical methods.

=== Religion ===
Census 2021 (1+%)
Religion	Number	Fraction
Roman Catholic Church	38,640	54.87%
None	17,111	24.3%
Evangelical Church	6488	9.21%
Not found out	5527	7.85%
Total	70,422	

In year 2021 was 70,422 people by religion 38,640 from Roman Catholic Church, 17,111 from None, 6488 from Evangelical Church, 5527 from Not found out, 419 from Greek Catholic Church, 400 from Christian Congregations in Slovakia, 355 from Calvinist Church, 306 from Jehovah's Witnesses, 267 from Baptists Church, 150 from Ad hoc movements, 146 from Other, 111 from Other and not ascertained christian church, 87 from Seventh-day Adventist Church, 84 from Islam, 72 from Eastern Orthodox Church, 60 from Buddhism, 59 from Paganism and natural spirituality, 45 from United Methodist Church, 31 from Apostolic Church, 24 from Old Catholic Church, 16 from Jewish community, 11 from Hinduism, 5 from Church of Jesus Christ of Latter-day Saints, 3 from Czechoslovak Hussite Church, 3 from Bahá'i Community and 2 from Church of the Brethren.

== Municipalities ==
Municipality	Area [km^{2}]	Population
Ábelová	52.17	208
Belina	6.48	633
Biskupice	7.87	1,137
Boľkovce	10.99	623
Budiná	17.31	194
Bulhary	9.53	352
Buzitka	13.80	446
Čakanovce	12.42	1,137
Čamovce	12.61	565
Divín	23.91	2,009
Dobroč	18.87	595
Fiľakovo	16.19	9,530
Fiľakovské Kováče	11.42	921
Gregorova Vieska	4.79	138
Halič	21.77	1,687
Holiša	10.34	674
Jelšovec	8.18	298
Kalonda	8.79	193
Kotmanová	16.78	256
Lehôtka	8.26	365
Lentvora	13.82	79
Lipovany	10.33	227
Lovinobaňa	21.12	1,905
Ľuboreč	31.66	345
Lučenec	47.80	24,427
Lupoč	9.34	230
Mašková	9.12	332
Mikušovce	5.00	295
Mučín	11.77	758
Mýtna	20.21	1,117
Nitra nad Ipľom	8.11	378
Nové Hony	16.64	187
Panické Dravce	11.07	746
Píla	7.55	253
Pinciná	11.91	196
Pleš	9.78	178
Podrečany	11.61	522
Polichno	11.07	120
Praha	9.29	78
Prša	3.49	184
Radzovce	18.78	1,562
Rapovce	8.82	915
Ratka	12.60	342
Ružiná	10.85	828
Stará Halič	17.59	658
Šávoľ	10.86	607
Šiatorská Bukovinka	21.64	262
Šíd	15.23	1,437
Šurice	13.99	437
Točnica	11.92	385
Tomášovce	14.10	1,312
Trebeľovce	19.52	834
Trenč	17.45	532
Tuhár	19.23	324
Veľká nad Ipľom	24.54	959
Veľké Dravce	9.53	655
Vidiná	5.47	1,692

Population and area values are current for year 2025.

== Sources ==
- Lučenec—ideal place for investment, published by Lučenec Town Council, Novohradská 1, 98401 Lučenec (Slovakia).
