= Mašková =

Mašková Maskófalva
- Municipality
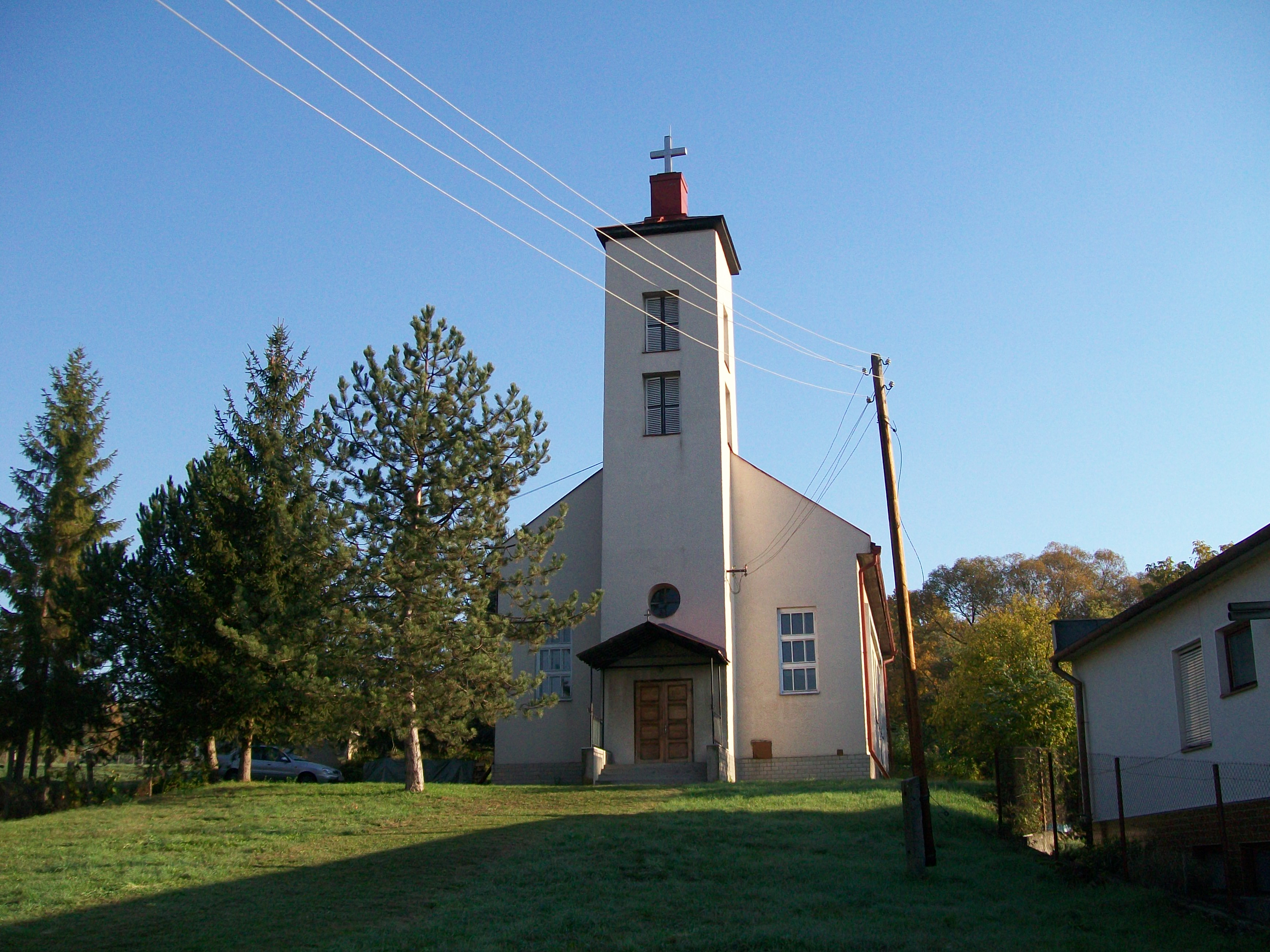
- Lutheran Church in Mašková

- Flag

- Location of Mašková in the Banská Bystrica Region Location of Mašková in Slovakia
- Coordinates: 48.33°N 19.57°E
- Country: Slovakia
- Region: Banská Bystrica Region
- District: Lučenec District
- First mentioned: 1332

Area
  - Total: 9.12 km^{2} (3.52 sq mi)
- Elevation: 209 m (686 ft)

Population (2025)
  - Total: 332
- Time zone: UTC+1 (CET)
  - Summer (DST): UTC+2 (CEST)
- Postal code: 985 11
- Area code: +421 47
- Vehicle registration plate (until 2022): LC
- Website: www.maskova.sk

Mašková (Hungarian: Maskófalva) is a village and municipality in the Lučenec District in the Banská Bystrica Region of Slovakia.

== Geography ==
The municipality lies at an altitude of 209 metres (686 ft) and covers an area of 9.12 km^{2} (3.52 sq mi) (2025).

== Population ==
Population statistic (10 years)
Year	1995	2005	2015	2025
Count	295	302	327	332
Difference		+2.37%	+8.27%	+1.52%

Population statistic
Year	2024	2025
Count	331	332
Difference		+0.30%

It has a population of 332 people (31 December 2025).

=== Ethnicity ===
Census 2021 (1+ %)
Ethnicity	Number	Fraction
Slovak	323	99.38%
Romani	28	8.61%
Total	325	

In year 2021 was 325 people by ethnicity 323 as Slovak, 28 as Romani, 1 as Czech and 1 as Not found out.

Note on population: The difference values of population numbers in the table "Population statistic" and in the sections "Ethnicity" & "Religion" is caused by the use of various statistical methods.

=== Religion ===
Census 2021 (1+ %)
Religion	Number	Fraction
Evangelical Church	130	40%
Roman Catholic Church	110	33.85%
None	72	22.15%
Not found out	10	3.08%
Total	325	

In year 2021 was 325 people by religion 130 from Evangelical Church, 110 from Roman Catholic Church, 72 from None, 10 from Not found out, 1 from Other and not ascertained christian church, 1 from Jehovah's Witnesses and 1 from Ad hoc movements.
