= Podrečany =

Podrečany Patakalja
- Municipality
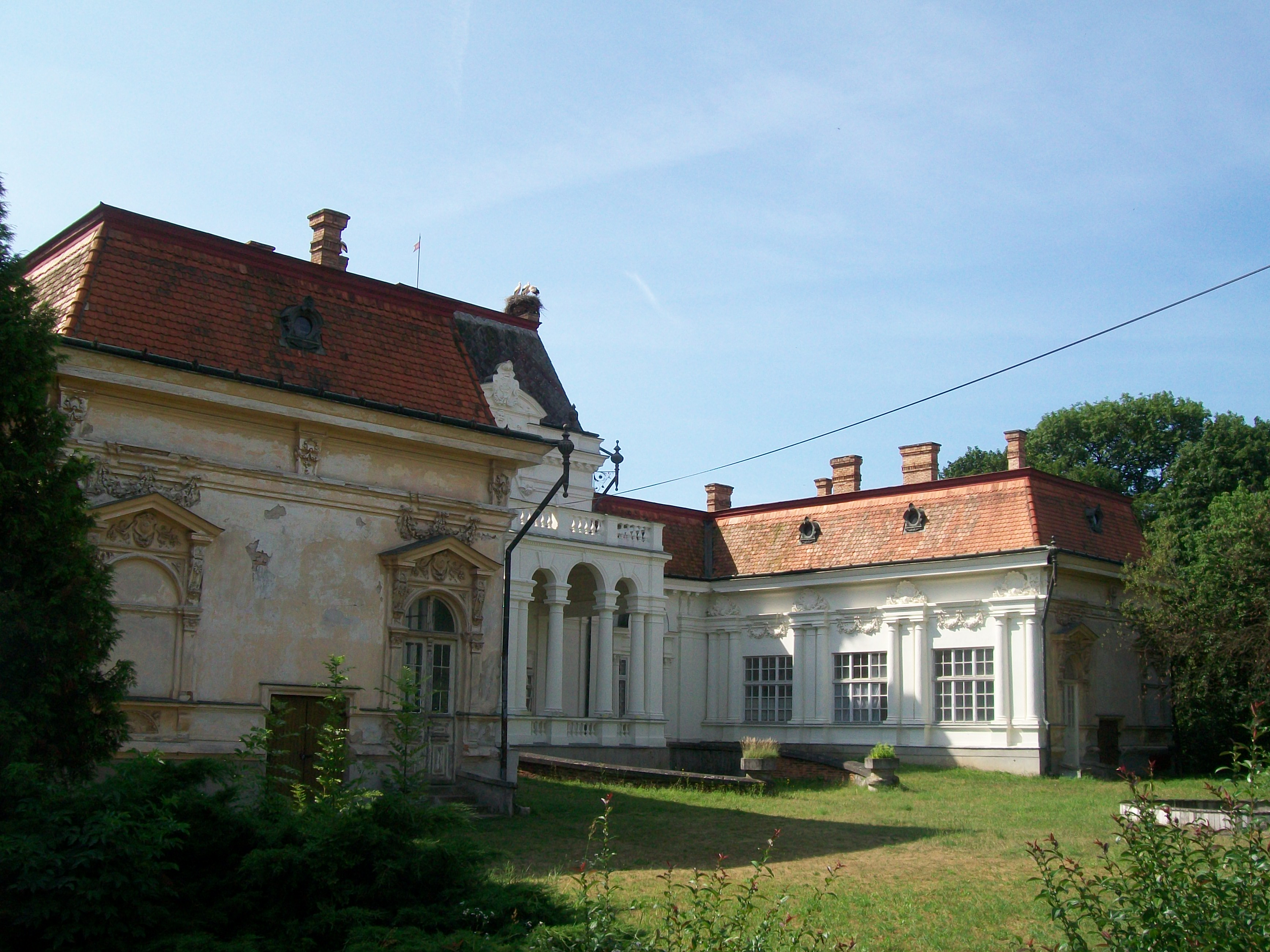
- Mansion in Podrečany

- Flag

- Location of Podrečany in the Banská Bystrica Region Location of Podrečany in Slovakia
- Coordinates: 48.40°N 19.62°E
- Country: Slovakia
- Region: Banská Bystrica Region
- District: Lučenec District
- First mentioned: 1393

Area
  - Total: 11.61 km^{2} (4.48 sq mi)
- Elevation: 216 m (709 ft)

Population (2025)
  - Total: 522
- Time zone: UTC+1 (CET)
  - Summer (DST): UTC+2 (CEST)
- Postal code: 985 55
- Area code: +421 47
- Vehicle registration plate (until 2022): LC
- Website: www.podrecany.sk

Podrečany (Hungarian: Patakalja) is a village and municipality in the Lučenec District in the Banská Bystrica Region of Slovakia.

== Geography ==
The municipality lies at an altitude of 216 metres (709 ft) and covers an area of 11.61 km^{2} (4.48 sq mi) (2025).

== Population ==
Population statistic (10 years)
Year	1995	2005	2015	2025
Count	568	586	553	522
Difference		+3.16%	−5.63%	−5.60%

Population statistic
Year	2024	2025
Count	508	522
Difference		+2.75%

It has a population of 522 people (31 December 2025).

=== Ethnicity ===
Census 2021 (1+ %)
Ethnicity	Number	Fraction
Slovak	498	94.49%
Not found out	19	3.6%
Hungarian	9	1.7%
Czech	7	1.32%
Total	527	

In year 2021 was 527 people by ethnicity 498 as Slovak, 19 as Not found out, 9 as Hungarian, 7 as Czech, 2 as Russian, 2 as German, 2 as Other, 1 as Jewish, 1 as Rusyn and 1 as Austrian.

Note on population: The difference values of population numbers in the table "Population statistic" and in the sections "Ethnicity" & "Religion" is caused by the use of various statistical methods.

=== Religion ===
Census 2021 (1+ %)
Religion	Number	Fraction
Roman Catholic Church	258	48.96%
Evangelical Church	133	25.24%
None	108	20.49%
Not found out	13	2.47%
Total	527	

In year 2021 was 527 people by religion 258 from Roman Catholic Church, 133 from Evangelical Church, 108 from None, 13 from Not found out, 4 from Christian Congregations in Slovakia, 2 from Greek Catholic Church, 2 from United Methodist Church, 2 from Baptists Church, 1 from Jewish community, 1 from Calvinist Church, 1 from Eastern Orthodox Church, 1 from Other and 1 from Ad hoc movements.
