= Mučín =

Mučín Mucsény
- Municipality
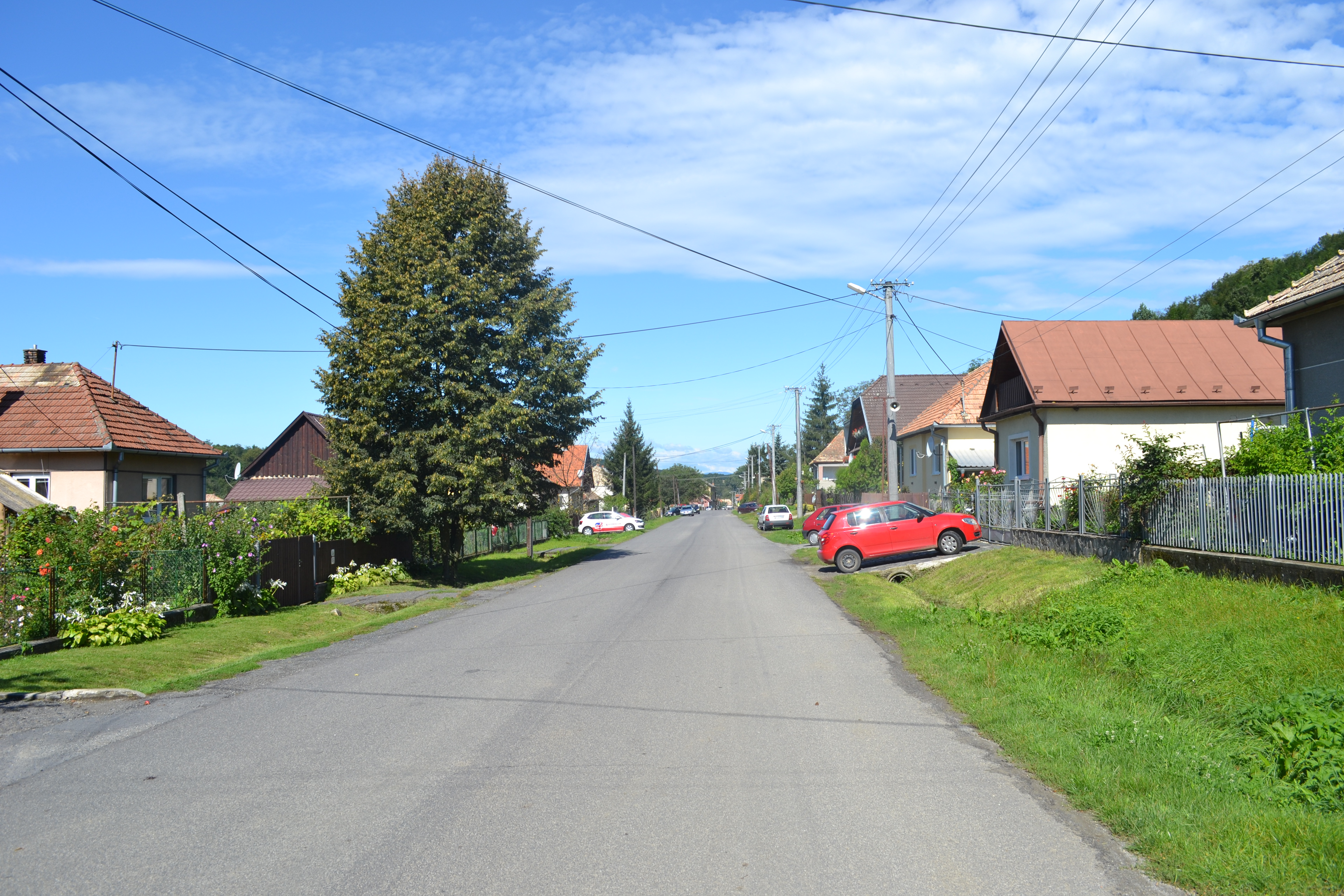

- Flag

- Location of Mučín in the Banská Bystrica Region Location of Mučín in Slovakia
- Coordinates: 48.25°N 19.70°E
- Country: Slovakia
- Region: Banská Bystrica Region
- District: Lučenec District
- First mentioned: 1246

Area
  - Total: 11.77 km^{2} (4.54 sq mi)
- Elevation: 189 m (620 ft)

Population (2025)
  - Total: 758
- Time zone: UTC+1 (CET)
  - Summer (DST): UTC+2 (CEST)
- Postal code: 985 31
- Area code: +421 47
- Vehicle registration plate (until 2022): LC
- Website: www.mucin.sk

Mučín (Hungarian: Mucsény) is a village and municipality in the Lučenec District in the Banská Bystrica Region of Slovakia.

== Geography ==
The municipality lies at an altitude of 189 metres (620 ft) and covers an area of 11.77 km^{2} (4.54 sq mi) (2025).

== Population ==
Population statistic (10 years)
| Year | 1995 | 2005 | 2015 | 2025 |
|---|---|---|---|---|
| Count | 676 | 687 | 771 | 758 |
| Difference | | +1.62% | +12.22% | −1.68% |

Population statistic
| Year | 2024 | 2025 |
|---|---|---|
| Count | 771 | 758 |
| Difference | | −1.68% |

It has a population of 758 people (31 December 2025).

=== Ethnicity ===
Census 2021 (1+ %)
| Ethnicity | Number | Fraction |
|---|---|---|
| Slovak | 502 | 65.79% |
| Romani | 201 | 26.34% |
| Hungarian | 117 | 15.33% |
| Not found out | 35 | 4.58% |
| Total | 763 | |

In year 2021 was 763 people by ethnicity 502 as Slovak, 201 as Romani, 117 as Hungarian, 35 as Not found out, 3 as Czech, 1 as Ukrainian, 1 as Rusyn, 1 as Russian and 1 as Other.

Note on population: The difference values of population numbers in the table "Population statistic" and in the sections "Ethnicity" & "Religion" is caused by the use of various statistical methods.

=== Religion ===
Census 2021 (1+ %)
| Religion | Number | Fraction |
|---|---|---|
| Roman Catholic Church | 500 | 65.53% |
| None | 171 | 22.41% |
| Not found out | 33 | 4.33% |
| Evangelical Church | 24 | 3.15% |
| Other and not ascertained christian church | 12 | 1.57% |
| Christian Congregations in Slovakia | 10 | 1.31% |
| Total | 763 | |

In year 2021 was 763 people by religion 500 from Roman Catholic Church, 171 from None, 33 from Not found out, 24 from Evangelical Church, 12 from Other and not ascertained christian church, 10 from Christian Congregations in Slovakia, 5 from Greek Catholic Church, 2 from Jehovah's Witnesses, 2 from Ad hoc movements, 1 from Jewish community, 1 from Old Catholic Church, 1 from Eastern Orthodox Church and 1 from Buddhism.
