= Rapovce =

Rapovce Rapp
- Municipality
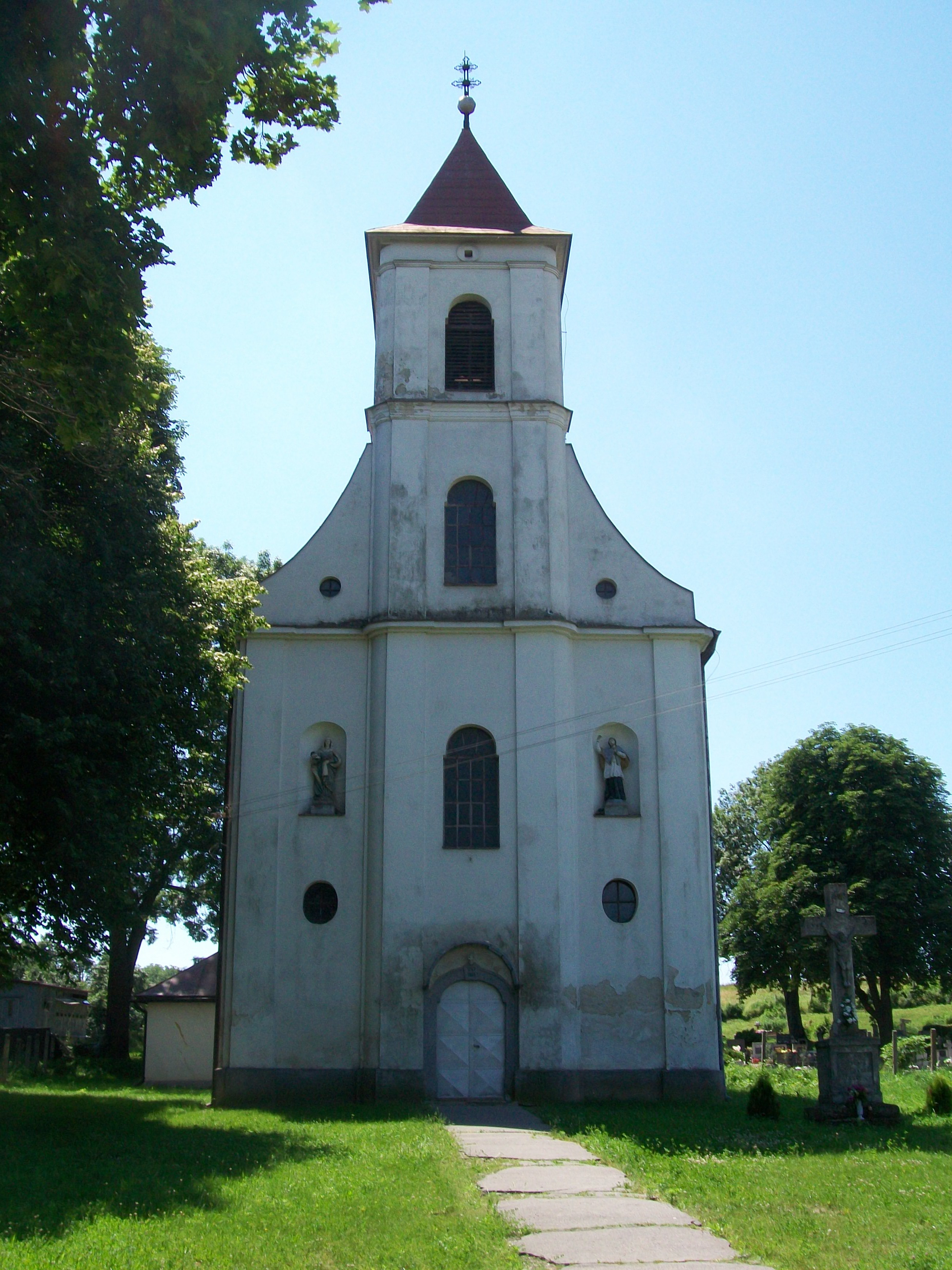

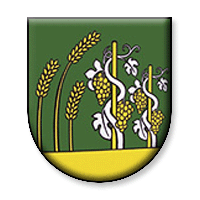
- Flag Coat of arms

- Location of Rapovce in the Banská Bystrica Region Location of Rapovce in Slovakia
- Coordinates: 48.27°N 19.68°E
- Country: Slovakia
- Region: Banská Bystrica Region
- District: Lučenec District
- First mentioned: 1312

Area
  - Total: 8.82 km^{2} (3.41 sq mi)
- Elevation: 174 m (571 ft)

Population (2025)
  - Total: 915
- Time zone: UTC+1 (CET)
  - Summer (DST): UTC+2 (CEST)
- Postal code: 985 31
- Area code: +421 47
- Vehicle registration plate (until 2022): LC
- Website: www.obecrapovce.sk

Rapovce (Hungarian: Rapp) is a village and municipality in the Lučenec District in the Banská Bystrica Region of Slovakia.

== Geography ==
The municipality lies at an altitude of 174 metres (571 ft) and covers an area of 8.82 km^{2} (3.41 sq mi) (2025).

== Population ==
Population statistic (10 years)
Year	1995	2005	2015	2025
Count	868	985	946	915
Difference		+13.47%	−3.95%	−3.27%

Population statistic
Year	2024	2025
Count	921	915
Difference		−0.65%

It has a population of 915 people (31 December 2025).

=== Ethnicity ===
Census 2021 (1+ %)
Ethnicity	Number	Fraction
Slovak	609	65.48%
Hungarian	302	32.47%
Not found out	74	7.95%
Romani	25	2.68%
Total	930	

In year 2021 was 930 people by ethnicity 609 as Slovak, 302 as Hungarian, 74 as Not found out, 25 as Romani, 6 as Czech, 1 as Ukrainian and 1 as Moravian.

Note on population: The difference values of population numbers in the table "Population statistic" and in the sections "Ethnicity" & "Religion" is caused by the use of various statistical methods.

=== Religion ===
Census 2021 (1+ %)
Religion	Number	Fraction
Roman Catholic Church	635	68.28%
None	131	14.09%
Not found out	68	7.31%
Evangelical Church	37	3.98%
Christian Congregations in Slovakia	19	2.04%
Other and not ascertained christian church	12	1.29%
Total	930	

In year 2021 was 930 people by religion 635 from Roman Catholic Church, 131 from None, 68 from Not found out, 37 from Evangelical Church, 19 from Christian Congregations in Slovakia, 12 from Other and not ascertained christian church, 7 from Jehovah's Witnesses, 7 from Greek Catholic Church, 6 from Other, 3 from Baptists Church, 3 from Ad hoc movements and 2 from Calvinist Church.
