= Nitra nad Ipľom =

Nitra nad Ipľom Ipolynyitra
- Municipality
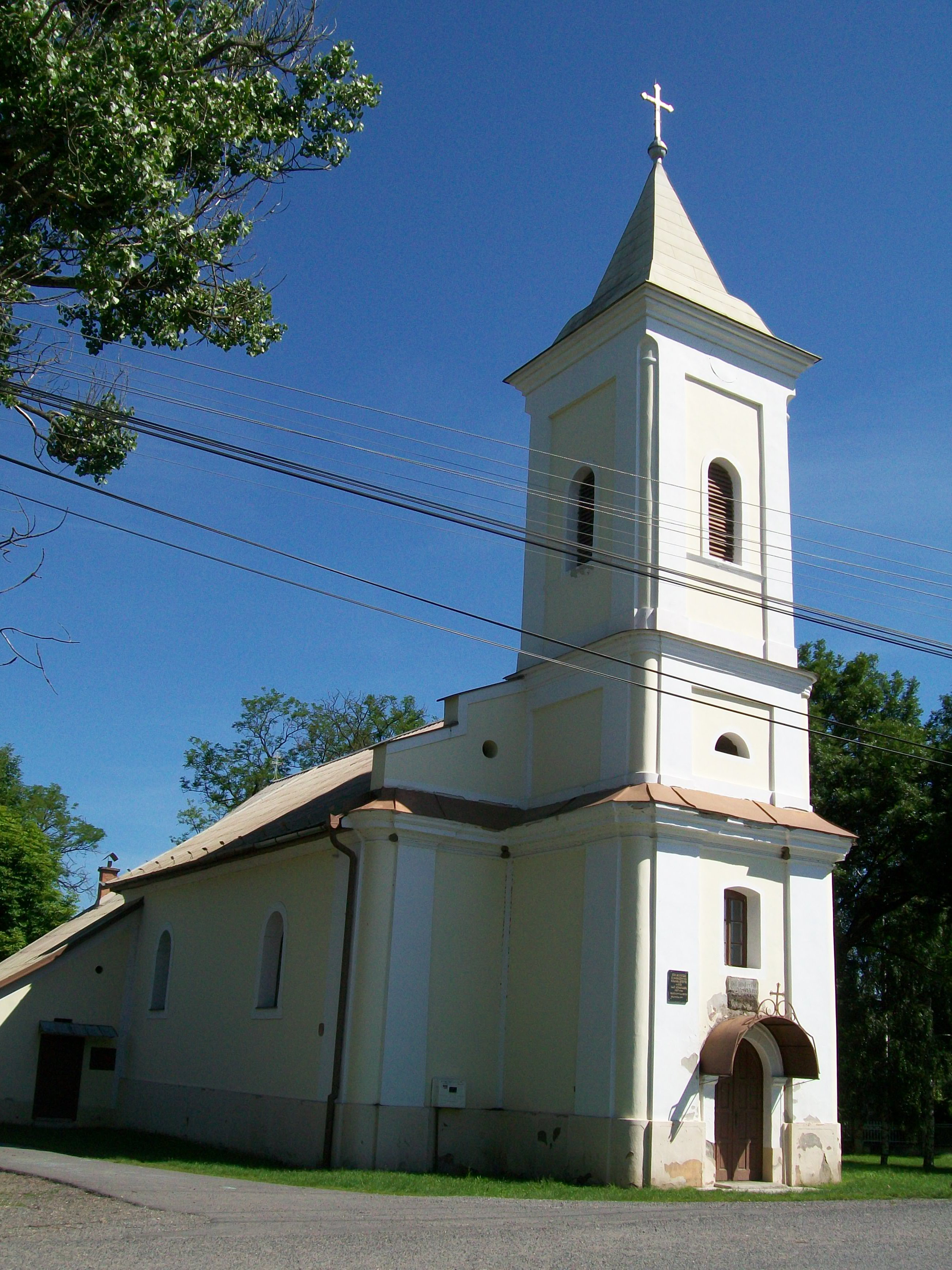
- Roman Catholic church in Nitra nad Ipľom

- Flag

- Location of Nitra nad Ipľom in the Banská Bystrica Region Location of Nitra nad Ipľom in Slovakia
- Coordinates: 48.32°N 19.78°E
- Country: Slovakia
- Region: Banská Bystrica Region
- District: Lučenec District
- First mentioned: 1350

Area
  - Total: 8.11 km^{2} (3.13 sq mi)
- Elevation: 180 m (590 ft)

Population (2025)
  - Total: 378
- Time zone: UTC+1 (CET)
  - Summer (DST): UTC+2 (CEST)
- Postal code: 985 57
- Area code: +421 47
- Vehicle registration plate (until 2022): LC
- Website: nitranadiplom.sk/index.php/sk/

Nitra nad Ipľom (Hungarian: Ipolynyitra) is a village and municipality in the Lučenec District in the Banská Bystrica Region of Slovakia.

== Geography ==
The municipality lies at an altitude of 180 metres (590 ft) and covers an area of 8.11 km^{2} (3.13 sq mi) (2025).

== Population ==
Population statistic (10 years)
Year	1995	2005	2015	2025
Count	239	282	369	378
Difference		+17.99%	+30.85%	+2.43%

Population statistic
Year	2024	2025
Count	374	378
Difference		+1.06%

It has a population of 378 people (31 December 2025).

=== Ethnicity ===
Census 2021 (1+ %)
Ethnicity	Number	Fraction
Romani	181	47.5%
Slovak	164	43.04%
Hungarian	89	23.35%
Not found out	14	3.67%
Total	381	

In year 2021 was 381 people by ethnicity 181 as Romani, 164 as Slovak, 89 as Hungarian and 14 as Not found out.

Note on population: The difference values of population numbers in the table "Population statistic" and in the sections "Ethnicity" & "Religion" is caused by the use of various statistical methods.

The vast majority of the municipality's population consists of the local Roma community. In 2019, they constituted an estimated 92% of the local population.

=== Religion ===
Census 2021 (1+ %)
Religion	Number	Fraction
Roman Catholic Church	253	66.4%
None	66	17.32%
Evangelical Church	30	7.87%
Christian Congregations in Slovakia	16	4.2%
Not found out	10	2.62%
Jehovah's Witnesses	5	1.31%
Total	381	

In year 2021 was 381 people by religion 253 from Roman Catholic Church, 66 from None, 30 from Evangelical Church, 16 from Christian Congregations in Slovakia, 10 from Not found out, 5 from Jehovah's Witnesses and 1 from Calvinist Church.
