= Novohrad Region =

Region in Slovakia

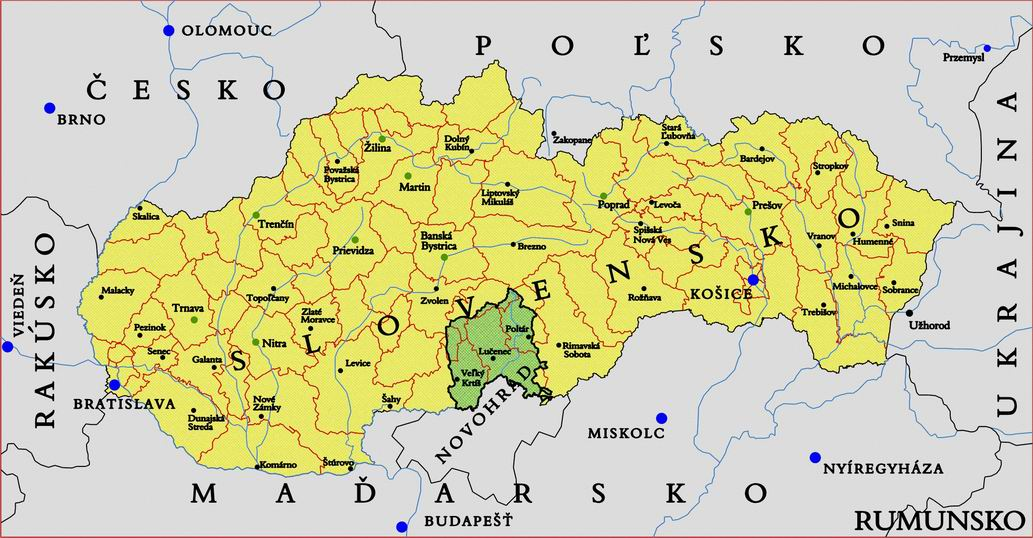
Novohrad region in Slovakia

Novohrad (also referred to as Poiplie) is a region located in Slovakia. Nowadays, the region does not form a separate territorial administrative unit, the name Novohrad is used as an informal name for the respective region.

== Geography ==
In Slovakia, the territory of Novohrad today covers almost the entire Lučenec district, approximately 2/3 of the Poltár district, the eastern half of the Veľký Krtíš district, the southern part of the Zvolen district (Lešť and its surroundings), the southern part of the Detva district and small parts of the Rimavská Sobota district. Historically significant villages of Novohrad include Halič and Divín.

The northern part of Novohrad is mountainous with hills and spa settlements, while the southern part features lowlands in the Slovak Ore Mountains along the Ipeľ river. The region's highest point is Bykovo hill at 1110.4 meters. Notable cultural sites include castles such as Fiľakovo, Hodejov, and Modrý Kameň, as well as Gothic churches with murals. Folk culture is preserved in local museums, particularly in Lučenec and Fiľakovo.

== History ==
The region was named after the Novohrad Castle, which was the seat of the Novohrad County Governor. At the end of the 19th century, it covered an area of 4,124 km². The intravolcanic furrow divides it into northern and southern parts. Novohrad region was founded in the 10th or around the turn of the 10th and 11th centuries. Originally, the territories of Hont and Malohont also belonged to it. From an ecclesiastical perspective, the northern part of Novohrad belonged to the Diocese of Esztergom, and the southern part to the Diocese of Vác.

The territorial integrity of Novohrad was disrupted by the Turks, who managed to conquer almost the entire region in the second half of the 16th century (including the castles of Modrý Kameň and Divín). The conquered territory was annexed to the Buda Pashalik and administratively belonged to three newly established sanjaks with their centers in Novohrad, Sečany, and Fiľakovo. During the Long Turkish War, the Turks lost Novohrad, and after the fall of Nové Zámky in 1663, they regained control of the castles in the south (Novohrad, Sečany, etc.).

Until the 19th century, Novohrad was divided into four serf districts; from the second half of the 19th century, it was divided into seven. The administrative center was originally in Novohrad; the administration of the yeoman's seat was located in Balážske Ďarmoty until the mid-16th century, then in Lučenec after the expulsion of the Turks, and again in Balážske Ďarmoty from 1790. After the collapse of the Austria-Hungary, the new Czechoslovak-Hungarian borders divided Novohrad into separate administrative units. The seat of the Slovak Novohrad County was in Lučenec.

== Places of interest ==
=== Šomoška Castle ===
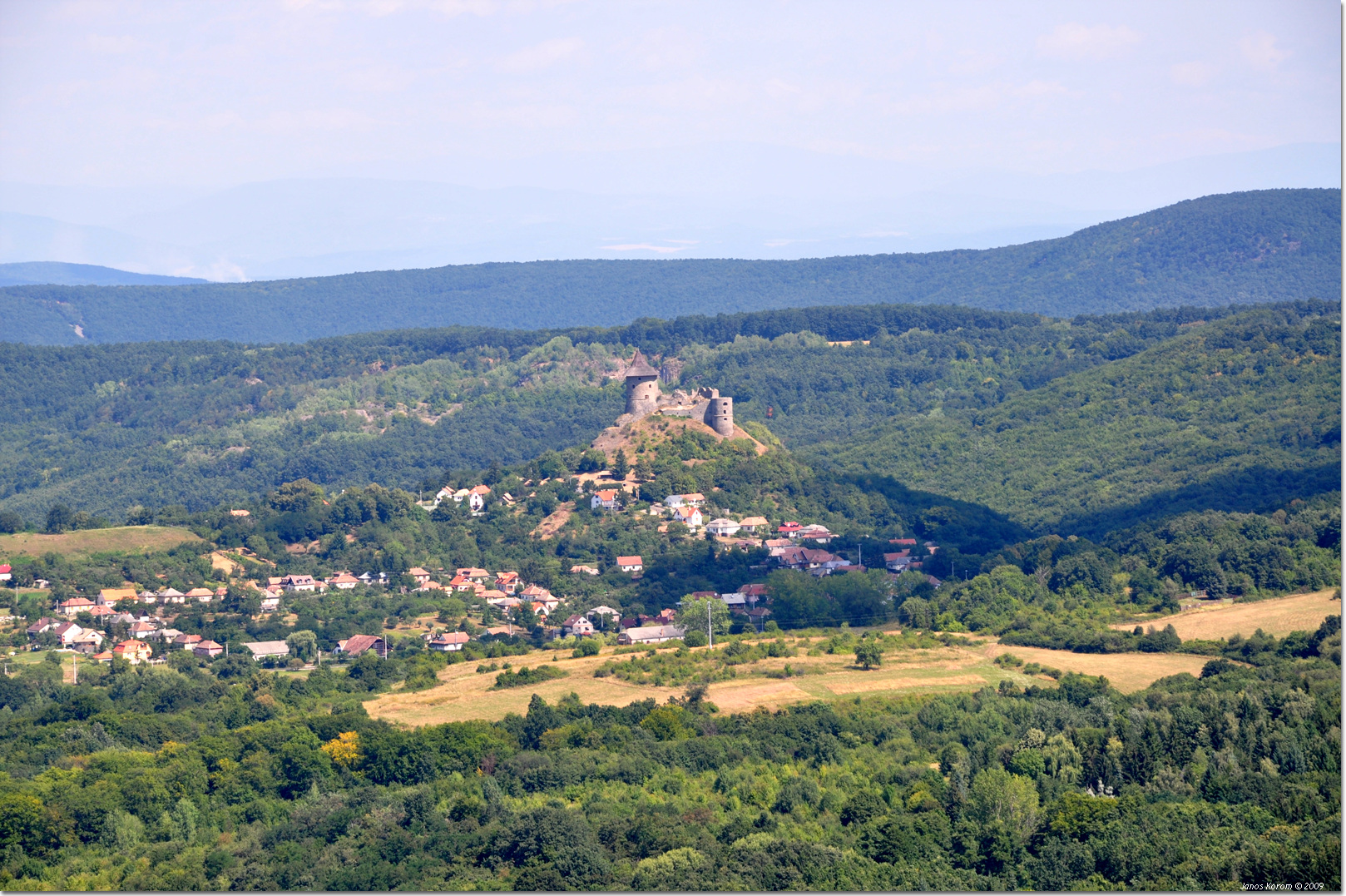
Ariel view of the ruins

Šomoška Castle are the ruins of a castle located in the village of Šiatorská Bukovinka in the Banská Bystrica Region of Slovakia. The castle is a part of the Cerová vrchovina Protected Landscape Area. The castle has had several names throughout its history during the era of the Kingdom of Hungary. In 1323, the castrum Somoskw, Somoskew meaning Drieňový Kameň, was also known as Drienov. In 2024, it was recorded that over 25,000 people had come to see the castle that year, making it one of the most popular castles in Slovakia for tourists that year.

=== Šomoška stone waterfall ===
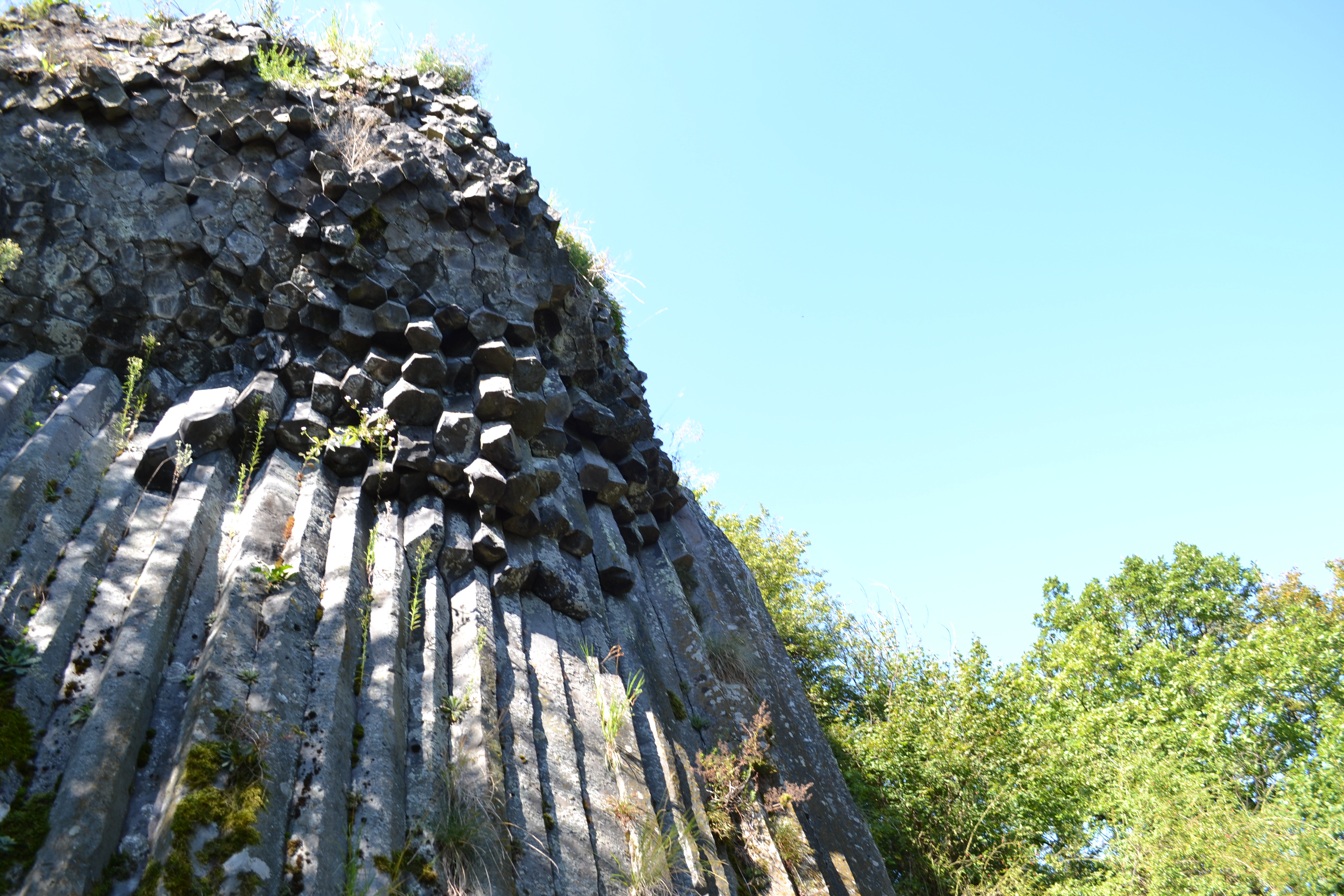
The stone waterfall

Šomoška stone waterfall is a natural feature, also known as a rock or stone waterfall, located in southern Slovakia, approximately 12 kilometers south of the town of Fiľakovo, in the Cerová vrchovina Protected Landscape Area. The rock waterfall is located on a hill next to the Šomoška Castle, where it was accidentally discovered during the re-construction of the gothic castle. Parts of the stone waterfall were used during the building of the castle walls.

=== Lučenec Synagogue ===
The Lučenec Synagogue is a former Neolog congregation and synagogue, located in Lučenec, in the Banská Bystrica region of Slovakia. Completed in 1925 in the Secession style and is registered as a National Cultural Monument, the building was used as a synagogue until World War II. It was reconstructed and reopened as a cultural centeron 13 May 2016.
