= Veľký Krtíš =

Veľký Krtíš Nagykürtös
- Municipality
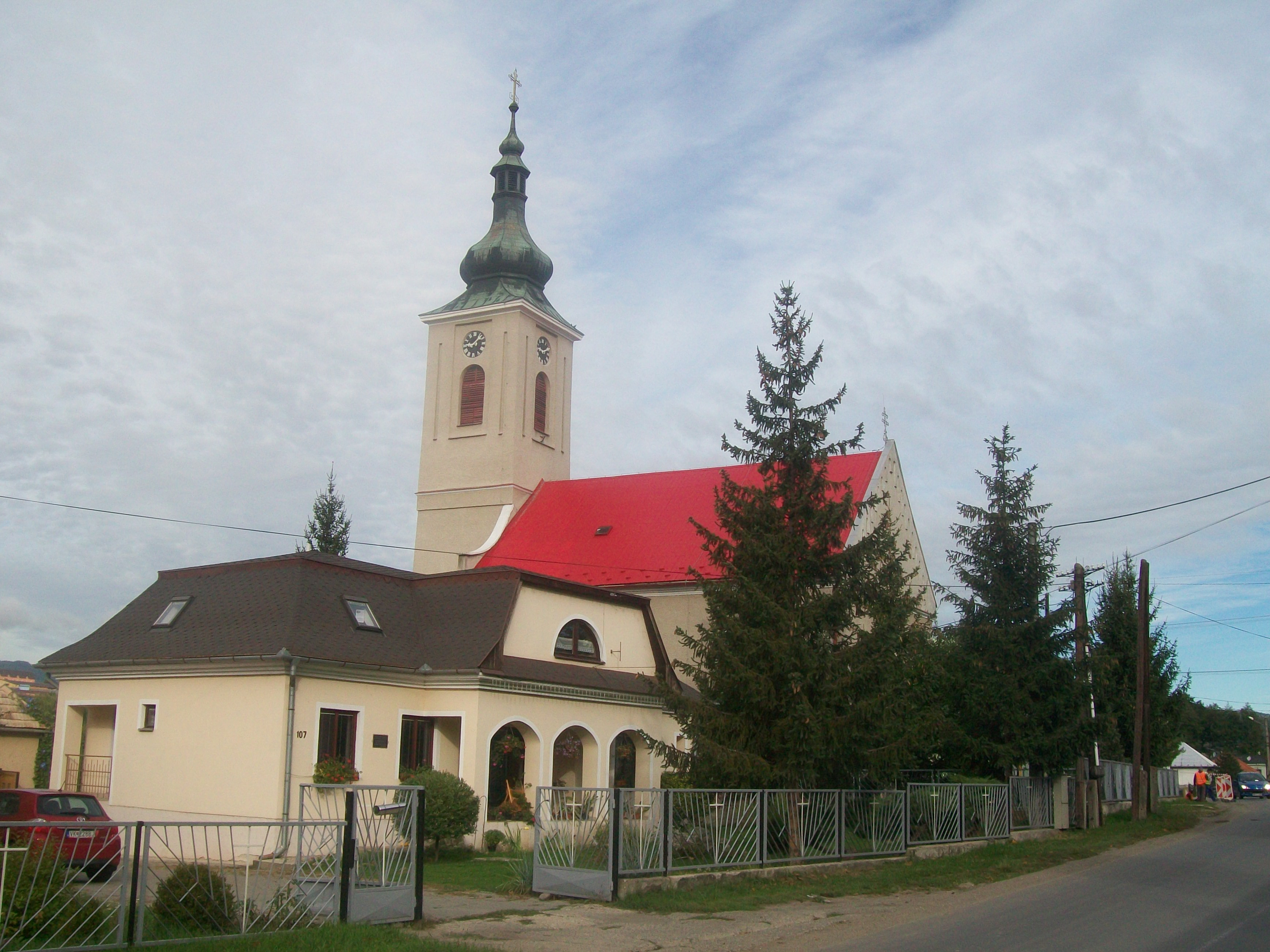
- Lutheran church and rectory

- Flag Coat of arms

- Location of Veľký Krtíš in the Banská Bystrica Region Location of Veľký Krtíš in Slovakia
- Coordinates: 48.22°N 19.34°E
- Country: Slovakia
- Region: Banská Bystrica Region
- District: Veľký Krtíš District
- First mentioned: 1245

Government
  - Mayor: Dalibor Surkoš

Area
  - Total: 15.00 km^{2} (5.79 sq mi)
- Elevation: 222 m (728 ft)

Population (2025)
  - Total: 10,049
- Time zone: UTC+1 (CET)
  - Summer (DST): UTC+2 (CEST)
- Postal code: 990 01
- Area code: +421 47
- Vehicle registration plate (until 2022): VK
- Website: www.velky-krtis.sk

Veľký Krtíš (before 1927 Veľký Krtýš, Hungarian: Nagykürtös) is a town in middle Slovakia, situated in the historical Novohrad region. The town's most important economic sectors are mining and agriculture.

== Etymology ==
The name is of Hungarian origin and is probably derived from the word kürtös which either means a bugler or, more likely motivated by the ethnonym Kürt (one of Magyar tribes).

== History ==
The town was first mentioned in the second half of the 13th century, although the name Krtíš first appeared in 1245 under name Curtus (Latin). Until 1919 it was the part of the Hungarian Kingdom, later Austria-Hungary, part of the Nograd - Novohrad region. It was ruled by Ottoman Empire between 1554 and 1594 and again between 1596 and 1686 as part of Filek sanjak, its centre was Rimaszombat. Before the establishment of independent Czechoslovakia in 1918, Veľký Krtíš was part of Nógrád County within the Kingdom of Hungary. From 1939 to 1945, it was part of the Slovak Republic, which was allied with Nazi Germany. The village suffered damages in the spring of 1945 when the Soviet army of the 2nd Ukrainian front together with the Romanian army met the Nazi German units. A Romanian military cemetery can be found in the nearby Modry Kamen. The village developed to a town in the 1960s with the opening of the mine for brown coal with massive industrialisation under the Communist Party. It had many industrial plants, Liaz; a large vehicular plant had a large plant in the until the 1990s on the outskirts towards Maly Krtris. The former Liaz plant is now owned by a Turkish investment firm producing luxury vehicle parts for various automobile companies like Aston Martin, Land Rover and Jaguar.

== Geography ==
The municipality lies at an altitude of 222 metres (728 ft) and covers an area of 15.00 km^{2} (5.79 sq mi) (2025).

It is situated in the Krupinská planina, at the foothills of Javorie, around 15 kilometres (9 mi) north of the Hungarian border and around 75 kilometres (47 mi) south of Banská Bystrica.

== Population ==
Historical population
Year	Pop.	±%
1970	4,425	—
1980	9,058	+104.7%
1991	13,686	+51.1%
2001	14,013	+2.4%
2011	12,999	−7.2%
2021	11,028	−15.2%
Source: Censuses

Population statistic (10 years)
Year	1995	2005	2015	2025
Count	14,168	13,862	12,255	10,049
Difference		−2.15%	−11.59%	−18.00%

Population statistic
Year	2024	2025
Count	10,274	10,049
Difference		−2.18%

It has a population of 10,049 people (31 December 2025).

=== Ethnicity ===
Census 2021 (1+ %)
Ethnicity	Number	Fraction
Slovak	9419	85.4%
Not found out	1053	9.54%
Hungarian	651	5.9%
Total	11,028	

In year 2021 was 11,028 people by ethnicity 9419 as Slovak, 1053 as Not found out, 651 as Hungarian, 98 as Czech, 97 as Romani, 32 as Ukrainian, 15 as Other, 12 as Chinese, 12 as Polish, 9 as Russian, 8 as Italian, 8 as Rusyn, 8 as German, 4 as Irish, 4 as Vietnamese, 3 as Canadian, 2 as Serbian, 2 as Austrian, 1 as Silesian, 1 as Romanian, 1 as Moravian and 1 as Bulgarian.

Note on population: The difference values of population numbers in the table "Population statistic" and in the sections "Ethnicity" & "Religion" is caused by the use of various statistical methods.

=== Religion ===
Census 2021 (1+ %)
Religion	Number	Fraction
Roman Catholic Church	4913	44.55%
None	2986	27.08%
Evangelical Church	1475	13.38%
Not found out	1317	11.94%
Total	11,028	

In year 2021 was 11,028 people by religion 4913 from Roman Catholic Church, 2986 from None, 1475 from Evangelical Church, 1317 from Not found out, 108 from Greek Catholic Church, 32 from Christian Congregations in Slovakia, 30 from Jehovah's Witnesses, 30 from Other, 28 from Eastern Orthodox Church, 26 from Ad hoc movements, 13 from Baptists Church, 11 from Other and not ascertained christian church, 10 from Calvinist Church, 10 from Buddhism, 9 from Old Catholic Church, 8 from Paganism and natural spirituality, 7 from United Methodist Church, 6 from Islam, 5 from Seventh-day Adventist Church, 3 from Hinduism and 1 from Bahá'i Community.

== Twin towns — sister cities ==
Veľký Krtíš is twinned with:

- Písek, Czech Republic
