= Novohrad =

Novohrad may refer to:

- Nógrád County (historical county), Kingdom of Hungary
- Novohrad Region, Slovakia
- Zviahel, Ukraine, formerly Novohrad-Volynskyi
