= Judah Behak =

Russian Hebrew writer and philologist

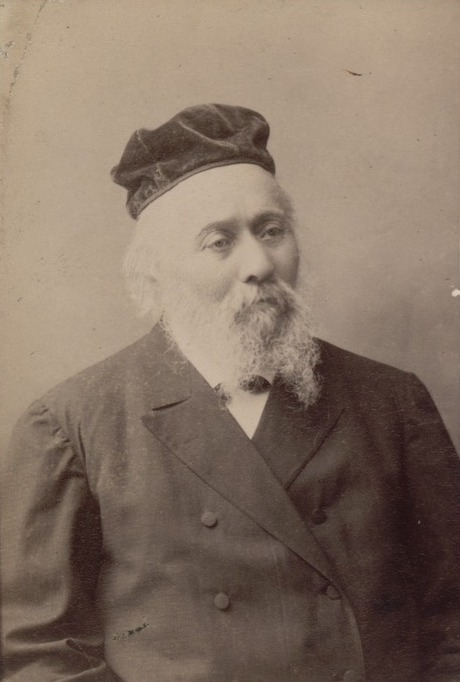
- Born: 5 August 1820; Vilna, Vilna Governorate, Russian Empire
- Died: 14 November 1900 (aged 80); Kherson, Kherson Governorate, Russian Empire
- Occupations: Writer, philologist, commentator
- Writing career
- Pen name: Ish Vilna be-Kherson
- Language: Hebrew

Judah Behak (Hebrew: יהודה בן יחיאל בעהאַק, romanized: Yehuda ben Yeḥiel Behak; 5 August 1820, in Vilna – 14 November 1900, in Kherson), also known by the pen name Ish Vilna be-Kherson (Hebrew: איש ווילנא בחערסאן, lit. 'A Vilnaite in Kherson'), was a Russian Hebrew writer, philologist, and Biblical commentator.

== Biography ==
Behak entered the literary field at the age of twenty, and engaged mainly in philological research, studying the Aramaic translation of the Bible and rational exegesis. He soon attracted attention by his scholarly articles in the Hebrew periodicals Pirḥe-Tzafon—the first Lithuanian Maskilic journal—and Ha-Karmel. When the Vilna Rabbinical School was established in 1848, Behak was invited to occupy the position of instructor in the Talmud of the advanced classes. This post he continued to hold until 1856, when he removed to Kherson, where he retired into private life. In commemoration of his eightieth birthday, some of the prominent members of the Jewish congregation of Kherson founded, under the name of "Beit-Yehudah," a school in which all subjects were to be taught in Hebrew.

Behak corresponded extensively with many of the Hebrew scholars of the second half of the nineteenth century. Besides numerous articles in various Hebrew periodicals, he published notes on the Biurim Ḥadashim to the Pentateuch, to be found in the first volume of the Bible edition published by Lebensohn and Benjacob (Vilna, 1848–53); ʻEtz Yehudah (lit. 'Judah's Tree'), a treatise on the prophet Samuel and on the twenty-four places in the Bible where the priests are also called Levites (Vilna, 1848); notes to Judah Leib Ben-Ze'ev's Talmud Leshon ʻIvri (Vilna, 1848 and 1857); notes to Solomon Löwisohn's Meḥkere Lashon (Vilna, 1849); and Tosefet Miluʼim (lit. 'Additional Notes'), a commentary on the Aramaic translation of the Pentateuch (Vilna, 1898).

== Partial bibliography ==
- ʻEtz Yehudah [Judah's Tree]. Vilna: Defus ha-almana ve-ha-aḥim Romm. 1884.
- Tosefet Miluʼim [Additional Notes]. Vilna: Defus ha-almana ve-ha-aḥim Romm. 1898.
