= Husiná =

Village and municipality in Slovakia

Husiná Guszona
- Municipality
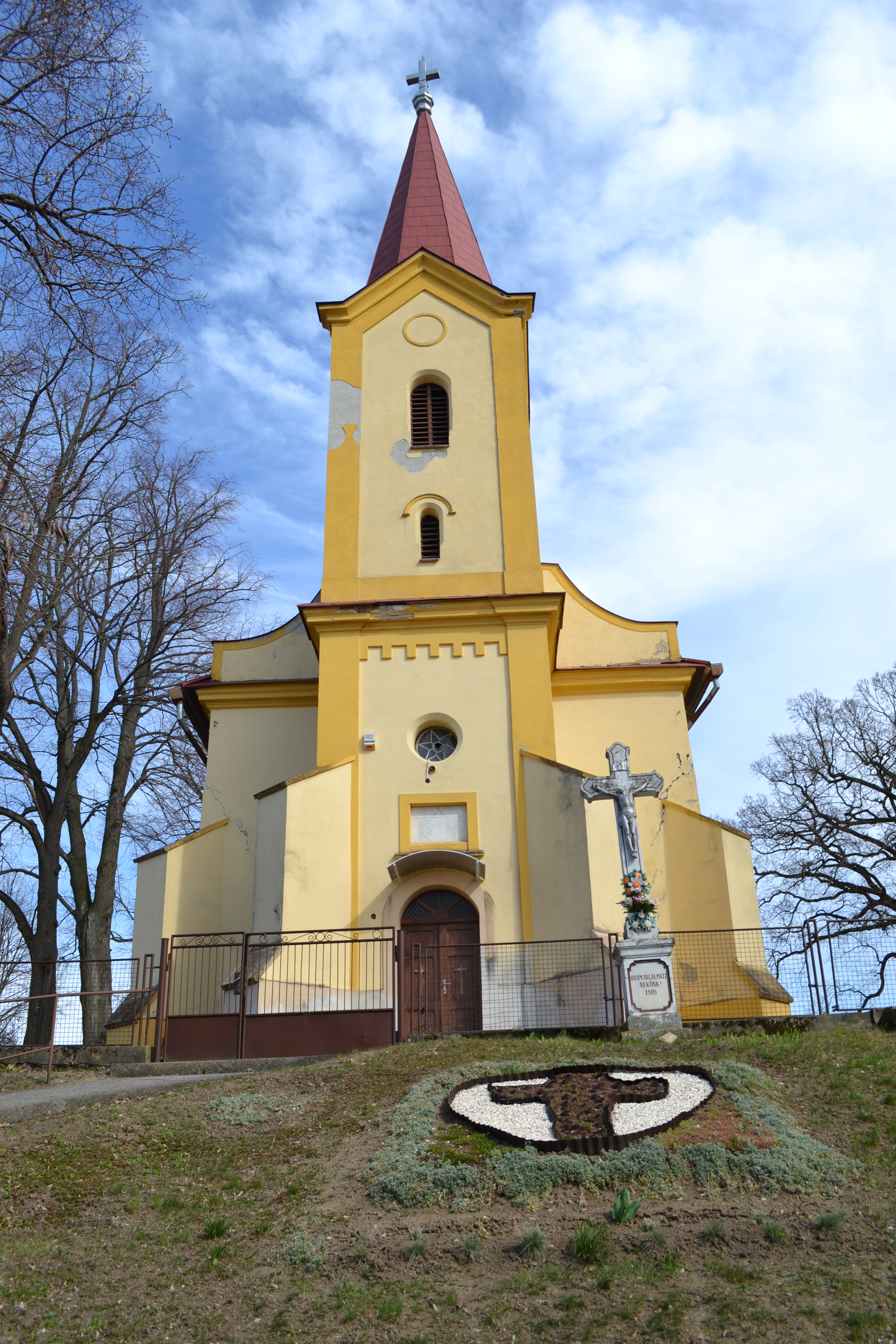

- Flag

- Location of Husiná in the Banská Bystrica Region Location of Husiná in Slovakia
- Coordinates: 48.35°N 19.90°E
- Country: Slovakia
- Region: Banská Bystrica Region
- District: Rimavská Sobota District
- First mentioned: 1322

Area
  - Total: 19.64 km^{2} (7.58 sq mi)
- Elevation: 241 m (791 ft)

Population (2025)
  - Total: 560
- Time zone: UTC+1 (CET)
  - Summer (DST): UTC+2 (CEST)
- Postal code: 985 42
- Area code: +421 47
- Vehicle registration plate (until 2022): RS
- Website: www.husina.sk

Husiná (Hungarian: Guszona, earlier: Guszonya) is a village and municipality in the Rimavská Sobota District of the Banská Bystrica Region of southern Slovakia.

== Geography ==
The municipality lies at an altitude of 241 metres (791 ft) and covers an area of 19.64 km^{2} (7.58 sq mi) (2025).

== History ==
In historical records, the village was first mentioned in 1332 (Guibna) as a village along with a parish. In the second half of 14th century it passed to Ratold noble family, and in the 15th century to the Perényi landowners as a part of the Filakovo town.

== Population ==
Population statistic (10 years)
Year	1995	2005	2015	2025
Count	444	507	553	560
Difference		+14.18%	+9.07%	+1.26%

Population statistic
Year	2024	2025
Count	545	560
Difference		+2.75%

It has a population of 560 people (31 December 2025).

=== Ethnicity ===
Census 2021 (1+ %)
Ethnicity	Number	Fraction
Hungarian	430	80.22%
Slovak	104	19.4%
Not found out	24	4.47%
Romani	11	2.05%
Total	536	

In year 2021 was 536 people by ethnicity 430 as Hungarian, 104 as Slovak, 24 as Not found out, 11 as Romani, 2 as Austrian and 1 as Czech.

Note on population: The difference values of population numbers in the table "Population statistic" and in the sections "Ethnicity" & "Religion" is caused by the use of various statistical methods.

=== Religion ===
Census 2021 (1+ %)
Religion	Number	Fraction
None	265	49.44%
Roman Catholic Church	247	46.08%
Not found out	16	2.99%
Total	536	

In year 2021 was 536 people by religion 265 from None, 247 from Roman Catholic Church, 16 from Not found out, 4 from Evangelical Church, 2 from Calvinist Church, 1 from Eastern Orthodox Church and 1 from Greek Catholic Church.

== Genealogical resources ==
The records for genealogical research are available at the state archive "Statny Archiv in Banska Bystrica, Slovakia"

- Roman Catholic church records (births/marriages/deaths): 1774-1873 (parish A)
- Lutheran church records (births/marriages/deaths): 1767-1883 (parish B)

== See also ==
- List of municipalities and towns in Slovakia
