= Ferenc Schmidt =

Hungarian politician

Member of the National Assembly
- In office 18 June 1998 – 13 May 2010

Personal details
- Born: 6 November 1941 Mór, People's Republic of Hungary
- Died: 25 December 2011 (aged 70) Székesfehérvár, Hungary
- Party: Fidesz
- Profession: politician

Ferenc Schmidt (6 November 1941 – 25 December 2011) was a Hungarian politician of German descent and was a member of the National Assembly (MP) from 1998 to 2010.

== Career ==
He was born in Mór, Fejér County, on 6 November 1941. He finished Dózsa György Economical Secondary School in 1960.

He served as a representative of the German minority in the Assembly of Mór Local Government since 1994. He was also a member of the German Minority Municipality from that year. He served as chairman of the German Regional Minority Self-Government of Fejér County between 2007 and 2011.

He was a candidate for position of mayor of Mór in 2002. He was a deputy in the National Assembly as a Fidesz member from 1998 to 2010.

== Awards ==
- Sándor Wekerle Prize (2007)
