= Mór =

Town in Fejér County, Hungary

Mór Moor
- Town
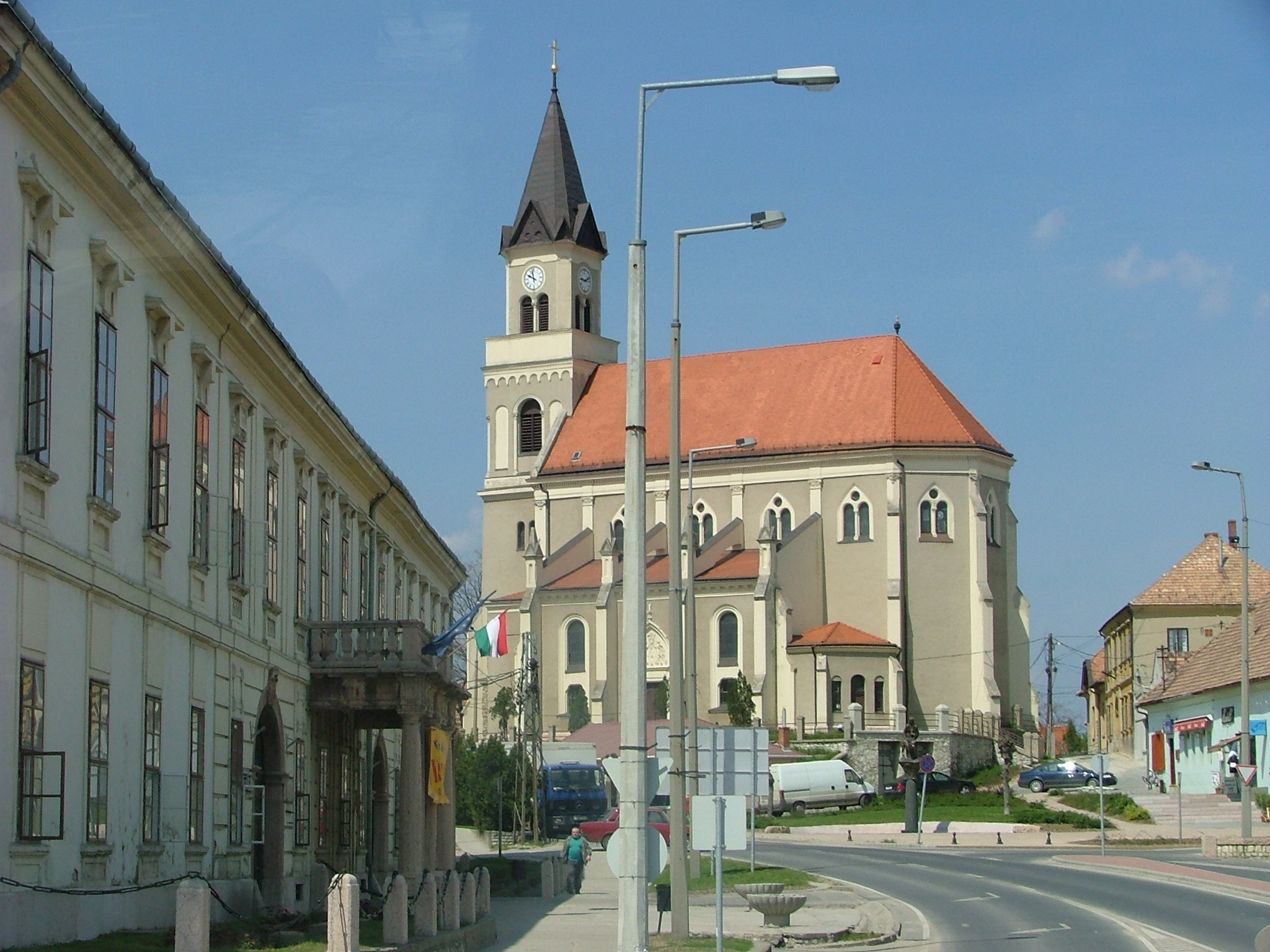
- The town centre

- Flag Coat of arms

- Location of Mór
- Coordinates: 47°22′18″N 18°12′31″E
- Country: Hungary
- County: Fejér
- District: Mór

Area
  - Total: 108.72 km^{2} (41.98 sq mi)

Population (2022)
  - Total: 13,518
  - Density: 136.09/km^{2} (352.5/sq mi)
- Time zone: UTC+1 (CET)
  - Summer (DST): UTC+2 (CEST)
- Postal code: 8060
- Area code: (+36) 22
- Website: www.mor.hu

Mór (German: Moor) is a town in Fejér County, Hungary. Among the smaller towns in the Central Transdanubia Region of Hungary, it lies between the Vértes and Bakony Hills, in the northwestern corner of Fejér County. The historic roots of the present town go back to the Celtic and Roman periods. The town is the economical, institutional and cultural centre of the small region of Mór including 13 settlements. The development of the town began with the arrival of ethnic German settlers and Capuchin monks in 1697.

The Battle of Mór on 30 December 1848 was a crucial victory for the Austrian Empire's forces in crushing the Hungarian Revolution of 1848.

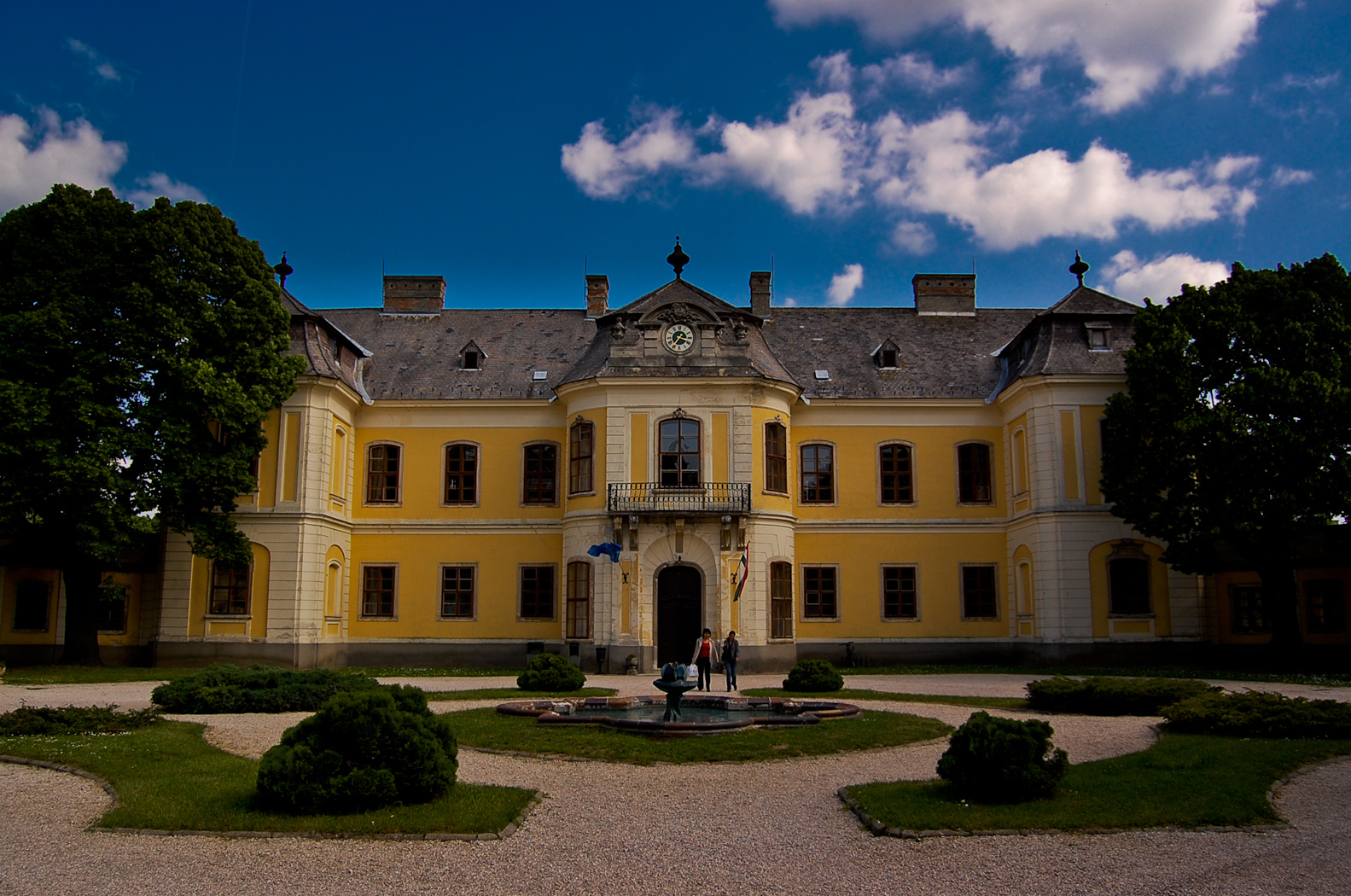
Lamberg Palace of Mór

== The Wine Region of Mór ==
Antiquarian artefacts show that vine growing occurred even in the Roman period. Vine growing came to stay from the 11th century in this area. The ethnic German settlers and the Capuchin monks started to grow grape vines in the beginning of the 18th century. The oenological boom lasted until the Phylloxera bane in 1875-1880 that killed most of the vineyards. Afterwards, Ezerjó became the most important type of wine in Mór, which now belongs to the Hungaricums. Ezerjó is a heavy, late-ripening variety of grape.

Unlike other parts of Hungary that produce sweet dessert wines, the wines from Mor tend to be clear and dry similar to a sauvignon blanc. Smaller, locally owned vineyards are giving away to commercial growers who have discovered Mor's perfect climate, soil, and humidity.

Timed to coincide with the grape harvest is the annual Wine Days of Mor festival, usually occurring in late September or early October. For one week each year, the town's population increases significantly to support this rural festival that highlights local culture. It includes the selection of a "Wine Princess" who oversees the festival, a multi-national parade celebrating Hungary's equestrian roots as well as the local wine culture, a stage for music, drama and dance, row upon row of stalls filled with regional food, crafts, local wines and palinka. On the final Saturday evening of the festival a street party is held and the entire town turns into a big dance party.

== The Mór massacre ==
On 9 May 2002, around noon, two armed men entered an Erste Bank office in Mór. For reasons unknown, they shot everyone in the building, including the customers, and left with 7.3 million Forints. Six people died instantly, the two survivors died in the hospital the following day. The case was not only notable for the brutality shown by the perpetrators, but also for the police confusion that followed: four days after the incident, police claimed that they had apprehended the two gunmen, Szilárd Horváth (who voluntarily gave himself up) and Róbert Farkas; the claim turned out to be false, however, as Horváth proved his alibi, and Farkas turned out to be an unlikely suspect as well.

On 22 July police arrested Ede Kaiser and László Hajdú, who were also suspected to have committed the robbery. This claim seemed more plausible, as both suspects had criminal records, and the witness reports seemed to fit their likeness; a month later, however, police major László Ferenczi admitted that all evidence in the case was indirect, and that the DNA tests failed to bring a result. The two men were arraigned, found guilty and sentenced between 2004 and 2006.

In February 2007, however, events took a sharp turn when a person apprehended after a murder of a postman at Tatabánya claimed to be one of the attackers at Mór. Investigation eventually revealed that the evidence collection in the case of Kaiser and Hajdú was blatantly cursory, and that the key witness of the case might have lied in court; the guns used at the robbery were eventually found at the apartment of one of the new suspects.

== Twin towns – sister cities ==
Mór is twinned with:

- Freudenberg, Germany
- Miercurea Nirajului, Romania
- Valdobbiadene, Italy
- Wolsztyn, Poland

== Famous people ==
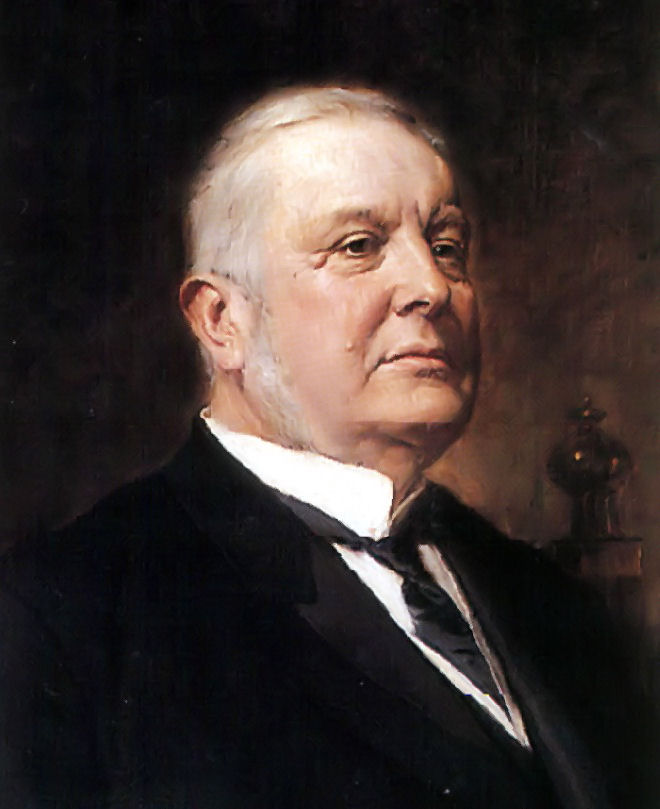
Sándor Wekerle, former Prime Minister of Hungary was born in Mór

- Sándor Büchler, Hungarian rabbi
- Ferenc Krausz, Hungarian-Austrian physicist, awarded the Gottfried Wilhelm Leibniz Prize in 2006 and Nobel prize in Physics in 2023
- Ferenc Schmidt, Hungarian politician
- Count Franz Philipp von Lamberg, Austrian general and statesman
- Sándor Wekerle, former Prime Minister of Hungary
- Solomon Löwisohn, Hungarian Jewish historian and poet
- Csaba Spandler, footballer
