= Šomoška stone waterfall =

Stone structure in Slovakia

Coordinates: 48°10′29″N 19°51′38″E

Šomoška rock waterfall
- Basalt rock
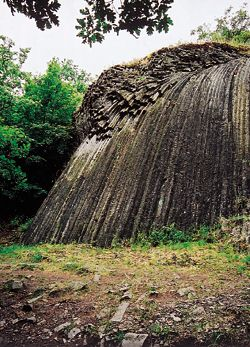
- The stone waterfall

Šomoška stone waterfall (Slovak: Kamenný vodopád, Hungarian: A somoskői bazaltorgonák) is a natural feature, also known as a rock or stone waterfall, located in southern Slovakia, approximately 12 kilometers south of the town of Fiľakovo, in the Cerová vrchovina Protected Landscape Area. The rock waterfall is located on a hill next to the Šomoška Castle, where it was accidentally discovered during the re-construction of the gothic castle. Parts of the stone waterfall were used during the building of the castle walls.

Basalt structures like the Šomoška rock waterfall are considered a rarity in Europe.

== Description ==
The rock waterfall was formed approximately 4 million years ago (Pliocene) as a result of solidification of basaltic lava. It is located on the eastern slope of the castle hill, which forms a basalt neck measuring 160 x 130 m. Five hexagonal columns, formed during slow cooling, are typical of basalt. However, such formation and characteristic curvature, demonstrated by the rock waterfall, are unique in Europe. Individual columns measure 15–20 cm in width and are inclined at an angle of 60–80°. The entire waterfall is approximately 9 m high and 15 m wide. Recrystallized inclusions of surrounding rocks can be found near the edges of the andesite bodies. Following the intrusion, hydrothermal activity took place, leading to the formation of various hydrothermal minerals. These minerals, including pyrite, magnetite, calcite, aragonite, dolomite, quartz, and zeolites, primarily developed in the cracks of the andesite body.

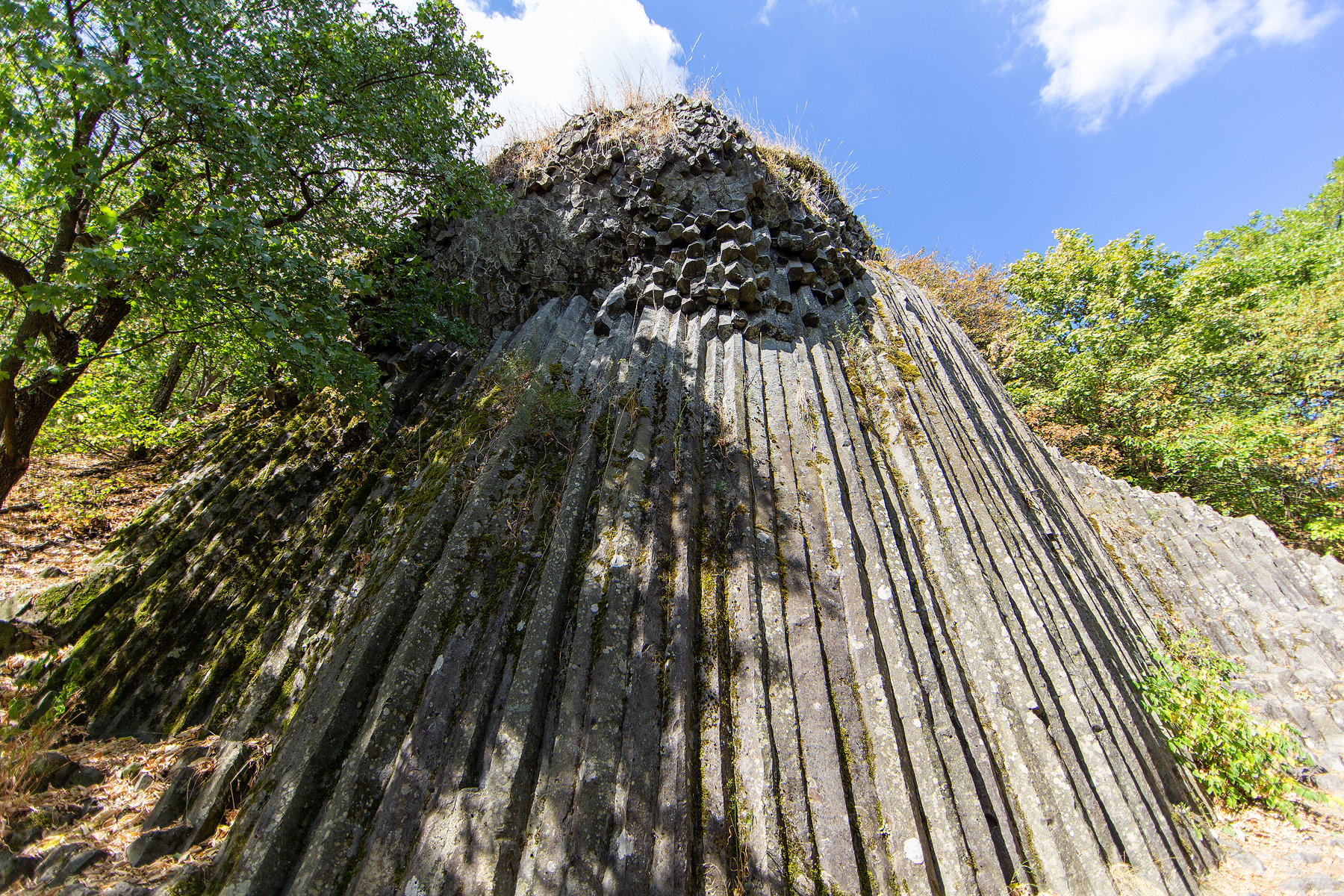
The waterfall is considered a rarity in Europe.

== Location ==
The waterfall is located within the boundaries of the Šomoška National Nature Reserve (Národná prírodná rezervácia Šomoška) and the cross-border (Slovak-Hungarian) Novohrad-Nógrád Geopark.

== See also ==
- List of individual rocks
- List of places with columnar jointed volcanics
