= Fiľakovo Castle Museum =

Museum in Fiľakovo, Slovakia

- Hradné múzeum vo Fiľakove
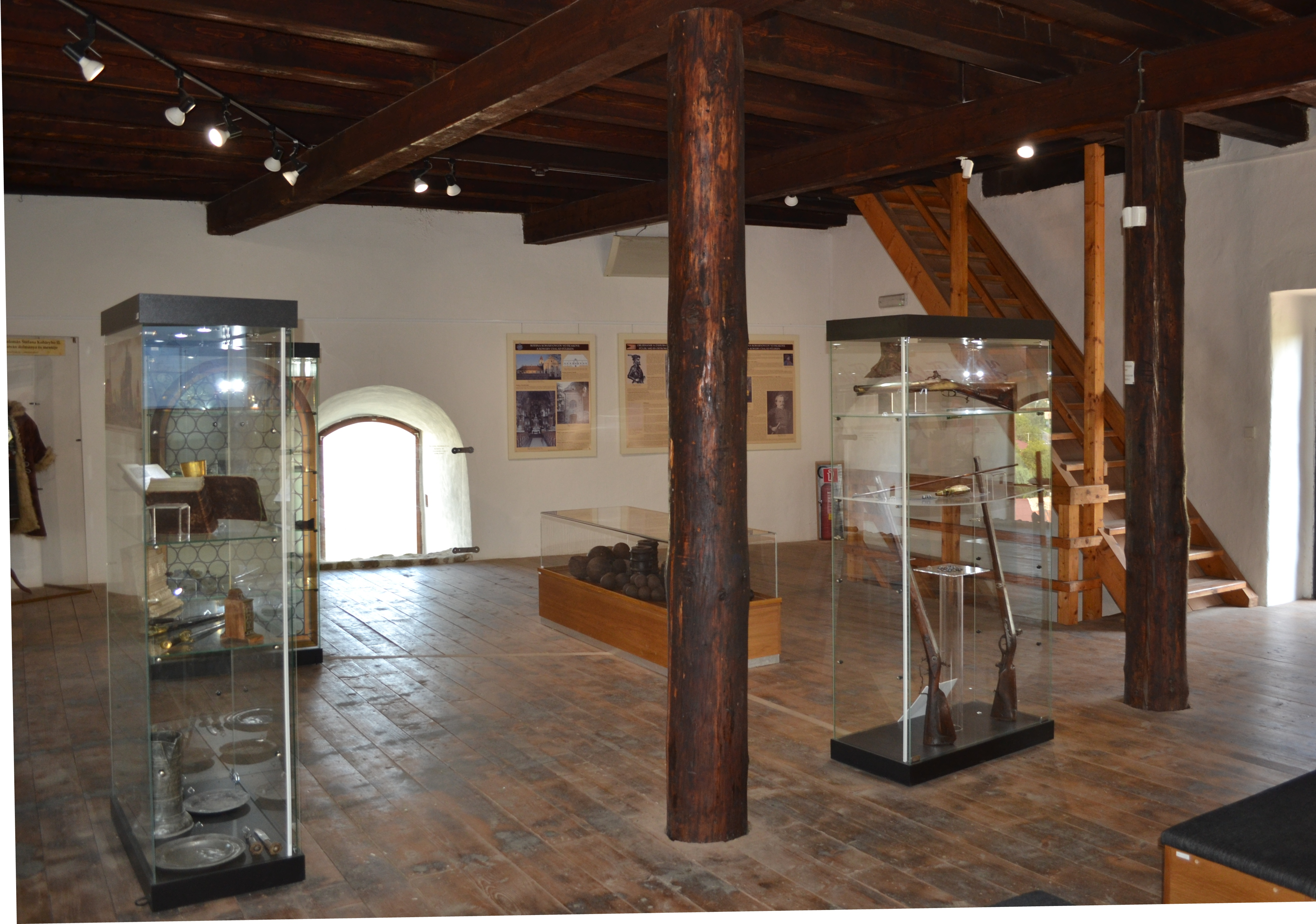
- Inside the museum
- Established: 2007; 19 years ago
- Location: Fiľakovo, Slovakia
- Coordinates: 48.271667°N 19.825278°E
- Type: History Museum
- Website: www.hradfilakovo.sk

The Fiľakovo Castle Museum (Slovak: Hradné múzeum vo Fiľakove) is a historic museum located within the Fiľakovo castle in Slovakia. The museum exhibits objects from the Turkish occupation of Fiľakovo. Parts are also considered important archaeological sites of Fiľakovo.

The idea of creating a Museum in the city originally dates back to 1941, initiated by Franciscan priest K. König, who organized archaeological excavations and efforts to establish the museum. Excavations began in 1944 but were interrupted by World War II. The first regional museum in Fiľakovo was founded in 1951, initially called the District Museum of Local History, later becoming the City Museum in 1960. It was integrated with a district museum for Lučenec in 1967, eventually operating under the name Novohradské múzeum in Fiľakovo.

== History ==
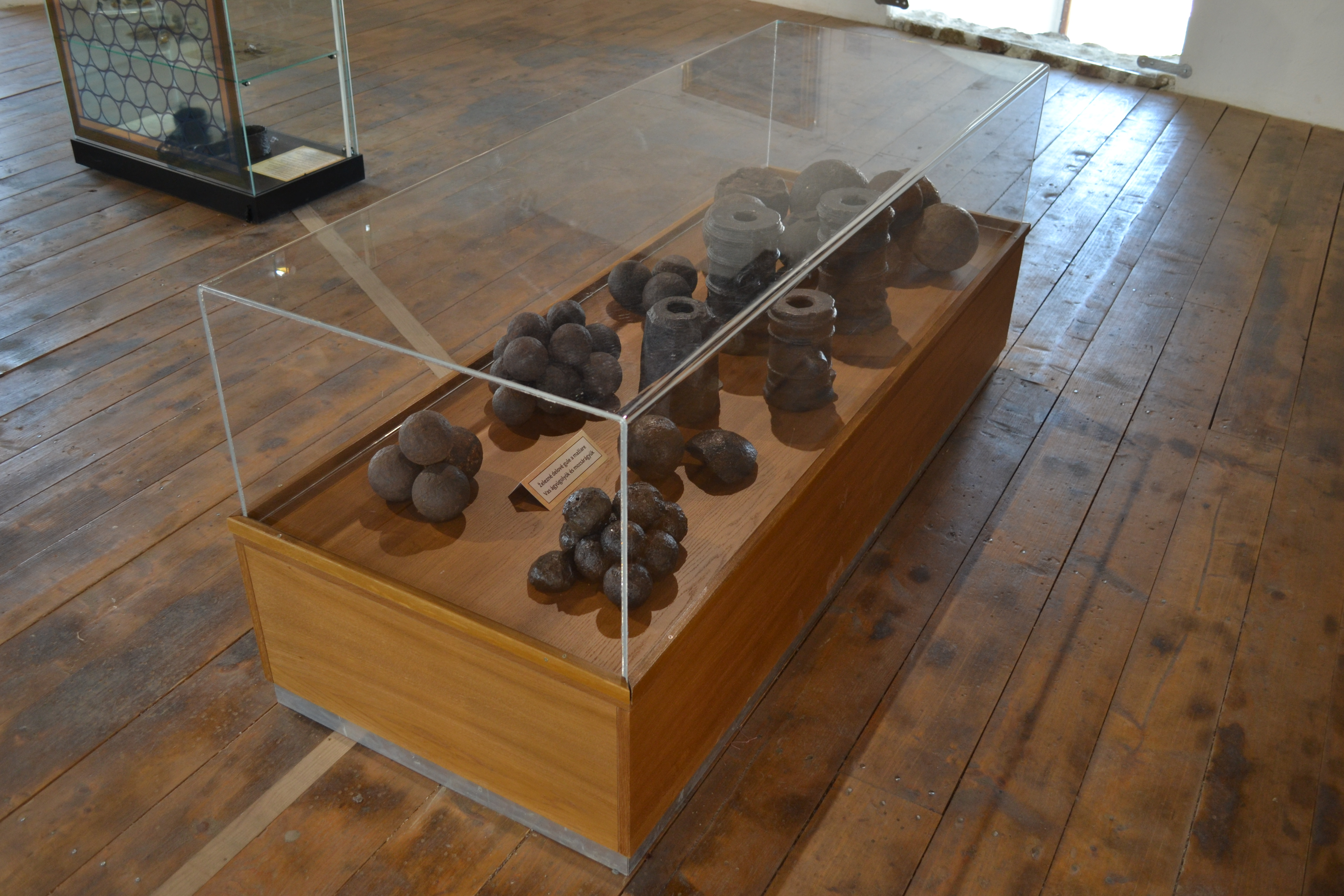
Iron cannonballs and mortars exhibition

The concept of establishing a museum dedicated to the Fiľakovo Castle dates back to 1941. The initiative was started by Franciscan priest K. König, who established the first Castle Commission to oversee the project. The commission began efforts to raise funds for the museum and submitted a request to the Hungarian National Museum in Budapest to carry out archaeological excavations of the castle site. Excavation work commenced in 1944 under the direction of Dr. János Kalmár; however, the outbreak of World War II interrupted both the archaeological research and the museum's development.

In 1951, the first regional museum serving the Slovak part of the Novohrad region was founded in Fiľakovo, initially known as the District Museum of Local History for the Fiľakovo District. This institution was later rebranded as the City Museum in 1960. In 1967, the museum was integrated with the District Museum of Local History for the Lučenec District, which had been established at Galician Castle in 1955. From 1971, it operated under the name Novohradské múzeum in Fiľakovo, and in 1976, it became a separate department of the Lučenec-based museum.

Between 1967 and 1984, the city hosted two permanent exhibitions. One of the City Museum located on the ground floor of the Franciscan monastery, and another of the Novohradské Museum housed in the historic Vigado building, originally a city redoubt built in 1900 and later serving as a burgher school from 1940. However, in 1984, the Novohradské Museum relocated to Lučenec due to inadequate facilities in Fiľakovo, and by 1988, the exhibition within the monastery was also dismantled. Consequently, for a period, the city lacked its own dedicated museum institution until the events of the Velvet Revolution.

In 1993, a new phase in the history of the Fiľakovo Museum began. The city’s request was approved by the Ministry of Culture of the Slovak Republic, which was the founding institution of the Novohrad Museum at the time. As a result, a portion of the collections from the City Museum, which had been stored in various unguarded depositories and had deteriorated over six years, was donated to the city of Fiľakovo. The renovated City Museum was established as a department of the City Cultural Center, and in 1994, a permanent exhibition was opened in three rooms of the Vigado building.

The idea of establishing a castle museum was revisited in the development plans of the local government in 2005. Between 2006 and 2007, the interior of the Bebek Bastion was reconstructed and adapted for museum purposes. In April 2007, the Castle Museum in Fiľakovo was officially founded, with the property of the City Museum being delineated and the Fiľakovo Castle assigned to its administration. In August 2008, the HMF opened a permanent exhibition on the three lower floors of the five-story Bebek Bastion, titled "Centuries of Fiľakovo Castle." This exhibit introduces visitors to the history of the town and the castle, from the first written mention to its destruction in 1682. It features rare medieval and early modern finds from the Slovak National Museum, including tiles depicting medieval Hungarian kings and saints, as well as original castle keys and objects from Fiľakovo’s 39-year Turkish occupation.
