= Cargo Cult (musician) =

Slovak musician

Cargo Cult was the stage name of Slovak musician Allan Vilhan, who produces music in the genre of electronica (currently producing under name "Blue MOON Science"). The work is a blend of ambient and beat-driven with subtle transitions from track to track. He describes it as "trip rock". Vilhan is originally from Filakovo, making music in his spare time. He was signed with the online music label Magnatune and publishing company ACM Records. As of 2004, he has produced two albums: Alchemy and Vibrant. Much of his music is licensed under Creative Commons, and his work has been used in the soundtrack of a video game. At present he lives in London.

== Discography ==
- Alchemy (2002), Magnatune
- Vibrant (2005)
