= Alexander Büchler =

Hungarian rabbi (1869–1944)

Alexander Büchler (Hebrew: שאנדור ביכלר, Hungarian: Bűchler Sándor; 24 September 1869 in Fülek (Fiľakovo), Kingdom of Hungary – July 1944 in Auschwitz) was a Hungarian rabbi and educator.

He is a son of the Talmudist rabbi Phineas Büchler of Mór. He was educated at the gymnasium in Székesfehérvár and at the university and the seminary of Budapest; he received the degree of Ph.D. in 1893 and was ordained as rabbi in 1895. In 1897 he was called to Keszthely.

== Literary works ==
Büchler's works include essays on the history of the Jews in Hungary, published in the "Magyar Zsidó Szemle" and the "Österreichische Wochenschrift", and the following books:

- "Niederlassungen der Juden in Europa im XVI. und XVII. Jahrhundert, mit Besonderer Rücksichtauf Ungarn", Budapest, 1893 (in Hungarian);
- "Schay Lamoreh", "Kolel Miktebe Ḥakme Yisrael", Budapest, 1895 (in Hebrew);
- "History of the Jews in Budapest", 1901 (in Hungarian)
