= Šomoška Castle =

Historic site in Slovakia

Coordinates: 48°10′17.08″N 19°51′24.93″E

- Šomoška hrad
- Šiatorská Bukovinka, Banská Bystrica Region, Slovakia
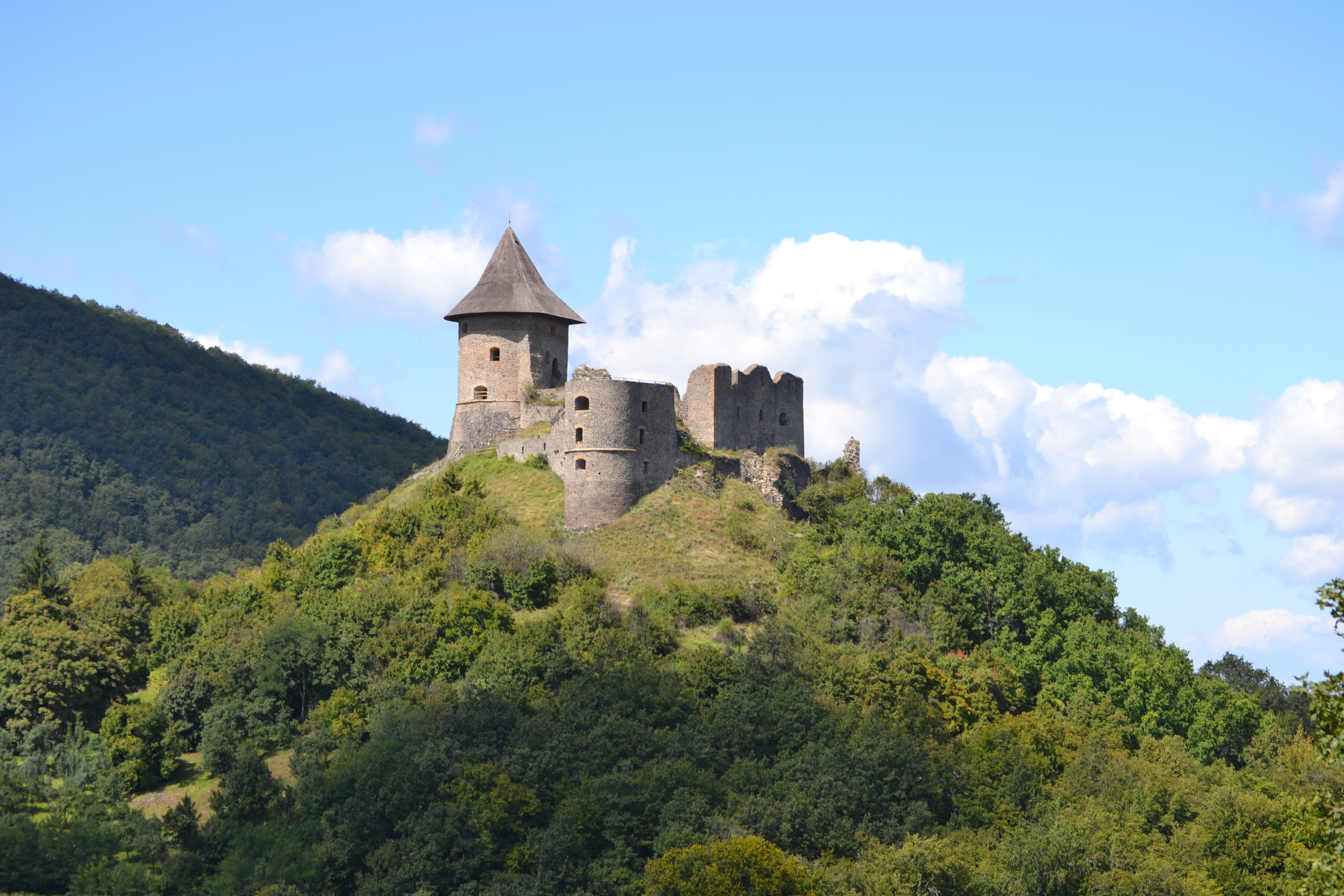

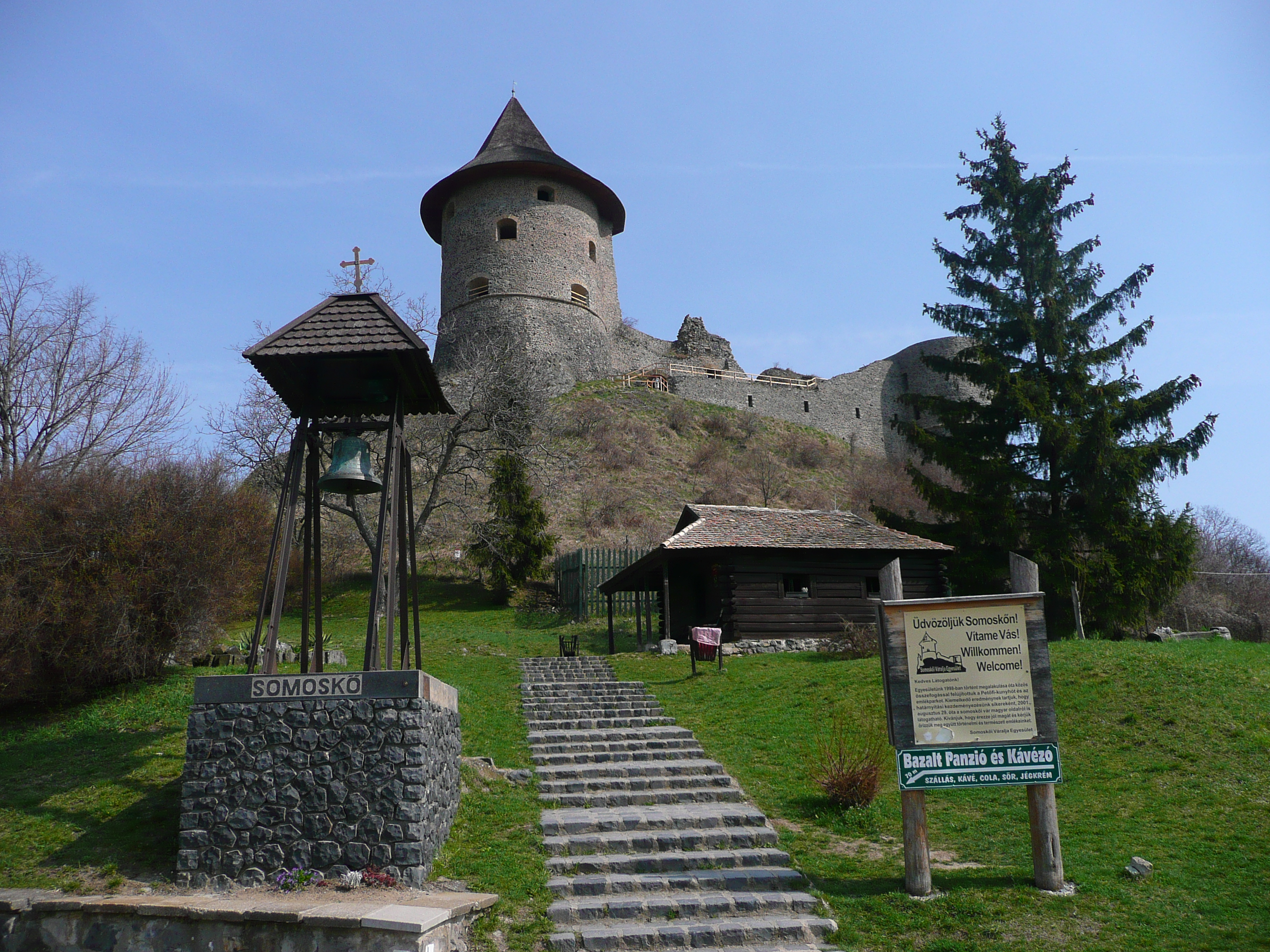

Site information
- Type: Castle

Site history
- Built: Before 1291

Šomoška Castle (Slovak: Šomoška hrad, Hungarian: somoskői vár) are the ruins of a castle located in the village of Šiatorská Bukovinka in the Banská Bystrica Region of Slovakia. The castle is a part of the Cerová vrchovina Protected Landscape Area.

Šomoška Castle has had several names throughout its history during the era of the Kingdom of Hungary. In 1323, the castrum Somoskw, Somoskew meaning Drieňový Kameň, was also known as Drienov.

In 2024, it was recorded that over 25,000 people had come to see the castle that year, making it one of the most popular castles in Slovakia for tourists that year.

== History ==
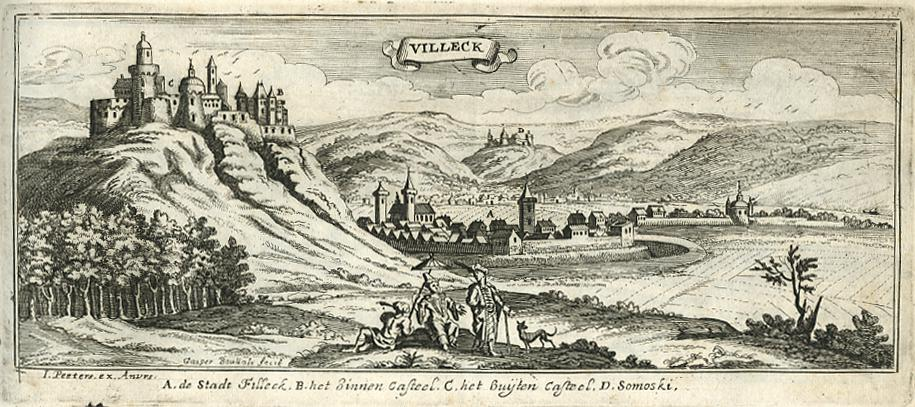
An illustration of how the castle might have looked like c.1683-1692.

The castle was built prior to 1291 by Peter of the Kacsics family. In 1310, his sons surrendered the castle to Matthew Csák after losing the Battle of Rozgony, thereby securing the southernmost stronghold of his territory. Following the demise of Csák, King Charles of Hungary transferred ownership of the castle to Thomas Kacsics, from whom the later Szécsényi family descended. It remained with his heirs until the family line ended in 1461.

The castle was later owned by the Losonci family. In the 1550s, the Turks seized nearly all the castles in the Nowohrad region, with Šomoška being the sole exception. The castle, safeguarded by its terrain, was able to defend itself. It also withstood another attack by the Turkish, during which Devín and Modry Kameń castles were taken over. It was not until around 1575 or 1576, that the castle was occupied by the Turks from 1573 to 1593, after which they eventually withdrew. The castle underwent further fortifications in 1618 and 1647 to 1655. During the anti-Habsburg uprising led by Francis II Rákóczi in 1703, it was occupied by insurgents. In the 1970s, efforts were made to conserve and partially reconstruct the ruins. In 2025, parts of the castle were renovated.

== Architecture ==
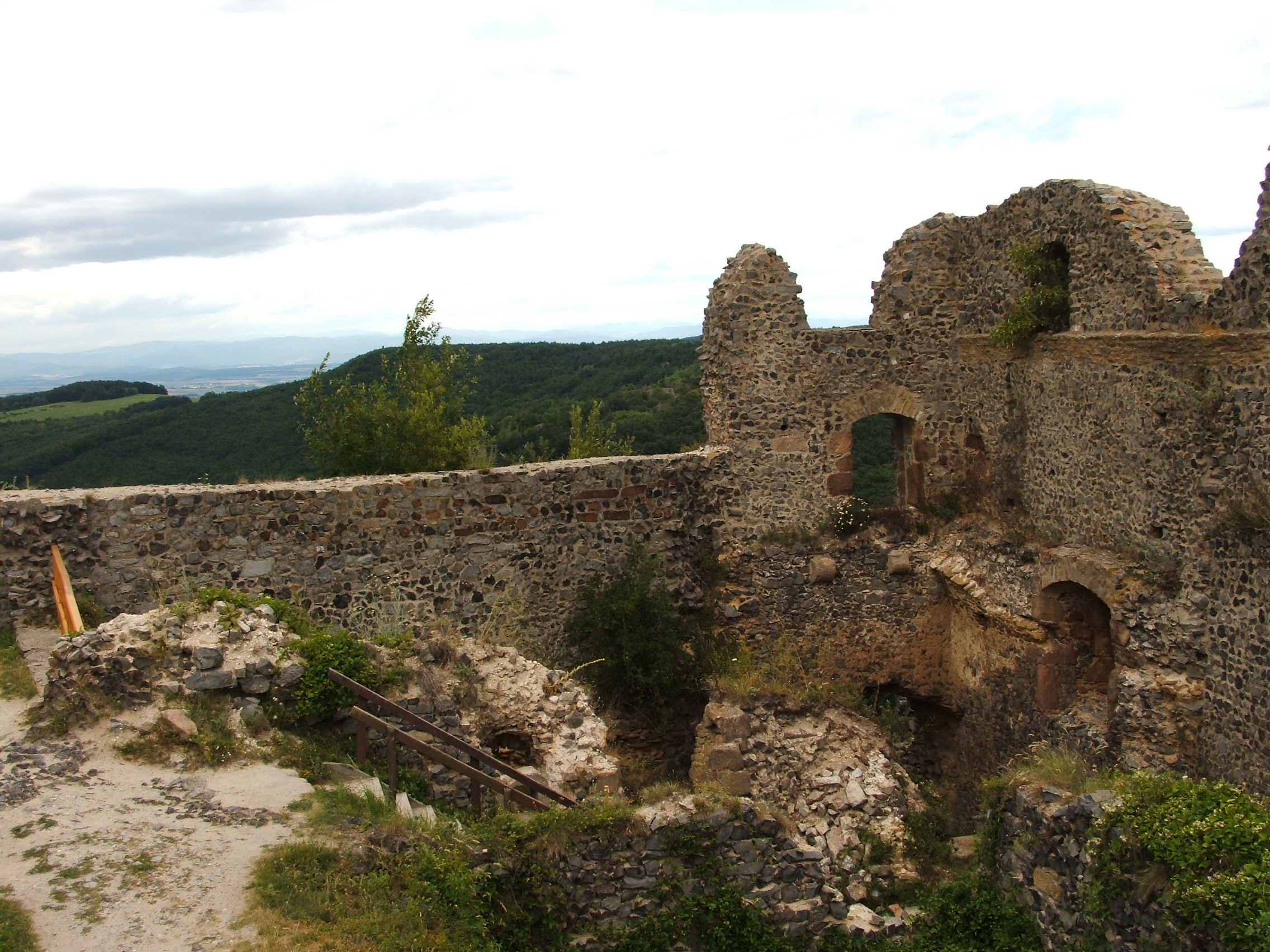
Inside of the castle walls.

The castle was constructed using basalt and mortar, situated on a solitary hill with steep inclines. The residential area consisted of a house located within the courtyard at the northern wall. Its eastern section may have taken the form of a four-sided tower, which was either covered or removed during subsequent expansions. In the latter half of the fifteenth century or the early sixteenth century, the castle underwent fortification with the addition of three corner cannon towers. The most formidable of these, located to the west, measured 16.5 meters in diameter, with walls that were 3.5 meters thick. A slightly smaller semicircular tower was positioned to the south, while a cylindrical tower to the north protected the access road to the castle. The southern and northern curtains were reinforced with new walls that included two-story firing positions for firearms. The castle also had a well in the basement of the residential house and a rainwater tank situated in the courtyard.

== Around the castle ==
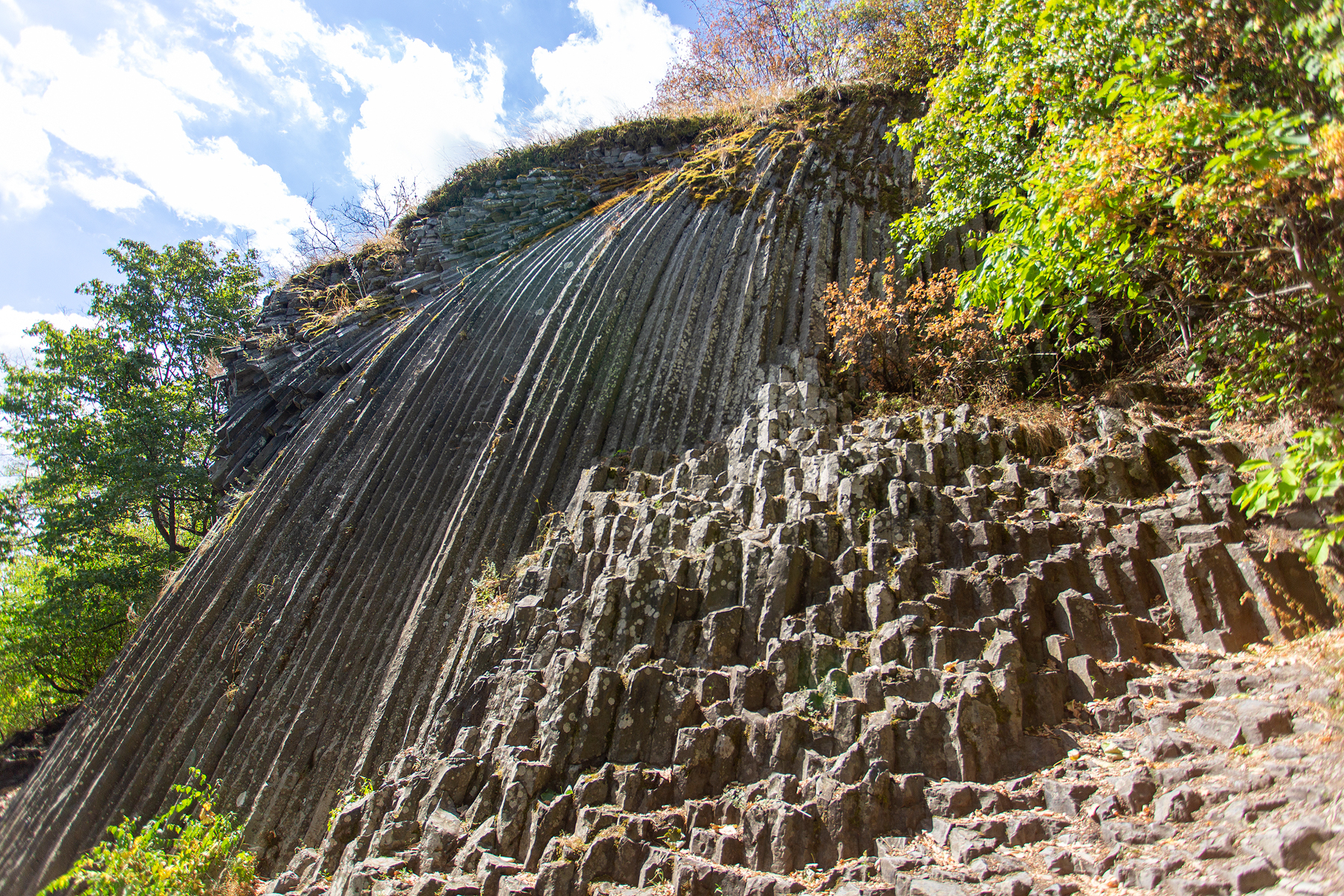
The waterfall is considered a rarity in Europe.

On the same hill as the Šomoška Castle is built on, there is a natural feature, also known as a rock or stone waterfall, called the Šomoška rock waterfall. The waterfall was discovered accidentally during the re-construction of the Castle. The rock waterfall was formed approximately 4 million years ago (Pliocene) as a result of solidification of basaltic lava.

== See also ==
- List of castles in Slovakia
