= Cerová vrchovina Protected Landscape Area =

Protected area in Slovakia

Cerová vrchovina Protected Landscape Area CHKO Cerová vrchovina
- IUCN category V (protected landscape/seascape)
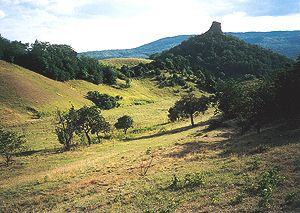
- Interactive map of Cerová vrchovina Protected Landscape Area; CHKO Cerová vrchovina
- Location: Southern Slovakia, Cerová vrchovina Mts.
- Coordinates: 48°14′N 19°59′E
- Area: 167.71 km^{2} (64.75 sq mi)
- Established: 10 October 1989
- Governing body: Správa CHKO Cerová vrchovina (CHKO Cerová vrchovina administration) in Rimavská Sobota

Cerová vrchovina Protected Landscape Area (Slovak: Chránená krajinná oblasť Cerová vrchovina) is one of the 14 protected landscape areas in Slovakia. The Landscape Area is situated in the Cerová vrchovina Mountains, part of the Western Carpathians, in southern Slovakia. It is situated in the Rimavská Sobota, Poltár and Lučenec districts and ends at the Slovak-Hungary borders in the east. The area protects 167.71 km^{2} of the mountains, and it excludes all urban areas, except for the villages of Hajnáčka and Šiatorská Bukovinka.

== History ==
The Protected Landscape Area was established on 10 October 1989. The law was amended on 3 September 2001. There were national nature reserves in the area before the Protected Landscape Area was created, for example Šomoška (declared in 1954) and Ragáč (1964).

== Geography ==
The highest hills are Karanč / Karancs at 729 m (2,392 ft) and Šiatoroš at 660 m (2,170 ft).

== Buildings and structures ==
- Šomoška Castle
- Šomoška rock waterfall
