= Solomon Löwisohn =

Hungarian-Jewish writer and historian (c. 1788/89-1821)

- Born: 1788 or 1789; Moor, Weißenburg County, Kingdom of Hungary
- Died: 27 April 1821 (aged 32); Moor, Weißenburg County, Kingdom of Hungary
- Writing career
- Language: Hebrew, German
- Movement: Haskalah

Solomon Löwisohn (Yiddish: שלמה לעוויזאהן, romanized: Shelomoh Levizohn, German: Salomo Löwisohn; 1788 or 1789 – 27 April 1821) was a Hungarian Maskilic poet, historian, grammarian, and linguist.

== Biography ==
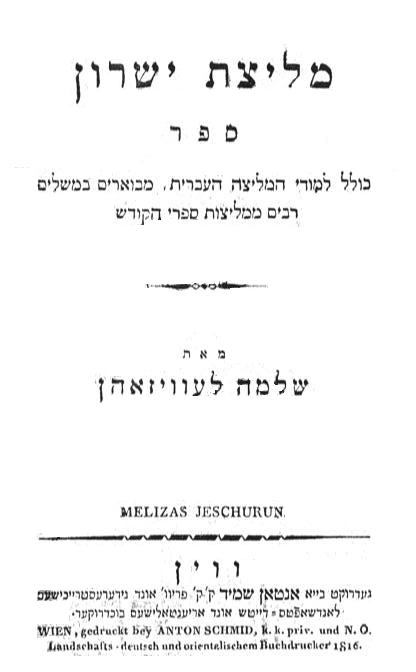
Title page of Melitsat yeshurun (1816).

Solomon Löwisohn was born into a prominent Jewish family in Moor, Weißenburg County. His father, himself a proficient Talmudist, taught the boy until he was fifteen years old. Since there was no Jewish school in the village, he sent him to Moor's Capuchin school to study German and arithmetic. The boy showed unusual talents; by the age of 13, he had already completely mastered the 24 books of the Tanakh and possessed a rare skill in Hebrew. During this period he tried his hand at festive and occasional poetry.

In 1809 he went to study at the Prague yeshivah with his relative Moses Saphir, and between 1813 and 1815 studied Semitic languages at the University of Prague. Löwisohn soon became closely associated with the Maskilic circle of Baruch and Judah Jeitteles. His first major work, a dialogue on Hebrew grammar between David Kimḥi and Joel Brill entitled Siḥah be-ʻolam ha-neshamot, was published in 1811.

In 1814, he accepted the position of corrector at the printing establishment of Anton Edler von Schmid in Vienna, but gave up his post in 1820. He quickly became physically and mentally ill, and succumbed to his ailments in his hometown in April 1821, at the age of 32.

== Work ==
Löwisohn's other works include Meḥkere erets, on the topography of the Tanakh, and Dikduk leshon ha-Mishna (1815), an essay on the language of the Mishnah. Further, he translated and annotated the Maḥzor, and part of the ritual for Tisha B'Av (1819). His most important works are Melitsat Yeshurun (1816), an analysis of the poetics of the Bible, and Vorlesungen über die neuere Geschichte der Juden (1820), of which the first volume only was published.

== Bibliography ==
- Siḥah be-ʻolam ha-neshamot [A Conversation in the World of Souls] (in Hebrew). Prague: F. Sommer. 1811. hdl:2027/hvd.hwsp8s.
- Bet ha-osef (in Hebrew). 1812.
- Dikduk leshon ha-Mishna [Grammar of the Language of the Mishnah]. 1815.
- Melitsat Yeshurun [The Eloquence of Jeshurun] (in Hebrew). Vienna: A. Schmid. 1816. hdl:2027/hvd.hwnlzx.
- Tikkune ha-tefillah (in Hebrew). Vienna. 1816.
- Meḥkere erets (in Hebrew). Vienna: Georg Holzinger. 1819. hdl:2027/nyp.33433110029596.
- Vorlesungen über die neuere Geschichte der Juden [Lectures on Modern Jewish History] (in German). Vienna: Karl Ferdinand Beck. 1820.
- Biblische Geographie (in German). Vienna: Karl Ferdinand Beck. 1821.
- Erets kedumim (in Hebrew). Vilna: M. Romm. 1839. hdl:2027/chi.091402693.
- Meḥkere lashon. Investigations linguae, siva duo opera...Sicha beolam hanschamoth et Beth haossef (in Hebrew). Vilna: Y. R. Romm. 1849. hdl:2027/hvd.hwmkhs.
