= Fiľakovo Castle =

Historic site in Fiľakovo, Slovakia

Fiľakovo castle
- Fiľakovo hrad
- Fiľakovo, Slovakia
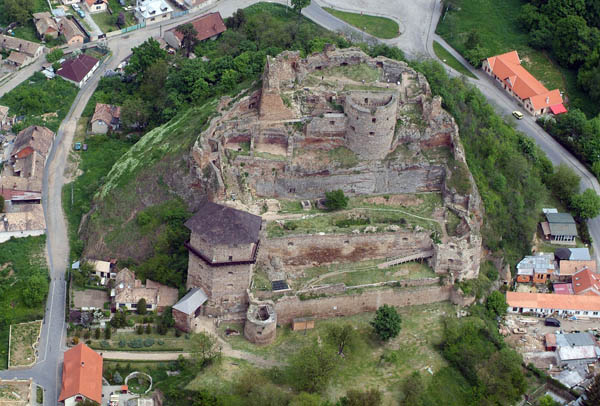
- Aerial view of the castle

Site information
- Type: Castle

Location
- Coordinates: 48.271667°N 19.825278°E

Fiľakovo Castle (Slovak: Fiľakovský hrad) is a ruined castle that dates back to the Middle Ages above the town of Fiľakovo in Slovakia.

== History ==
Archaeological findings date the settlement of the castle hill from the Copper Age (approx. 3500 BC). In the 12th century, a stone castle probably stood on the site of the castle hill. The first written mention of the castle is from 1242, where it is written that the Fiľakovo castle resisted Mongol raids. The castle had several owners including Matthew III Csák. In 1483, the castle was conquered by the troops of King Matthias Corvinus and István Peréni was expelled from it. From 1490, the administration of the castle was entrusted to the Buda captain Balázs Ráskay. Ferenc Bebek married Ráskay’s daughter and received the castle as a dowry. After the Turkish threat intensified, the castle was rebuilt in 1551 according to the plans of the Italian architect A. da Vedano into a massive Renaissance fortress. Along with the castle, a city fortification was also built, connecting to the castle acropolis. Despite the efforts of the defenders, the castle fell into the hands of the Turks in 1554, who settled there for 39 years. From here, Beg Hamza ruled, and after him Beg Šaman ruled a large part of southern Slovakia – the Fiľakovo sanjak.

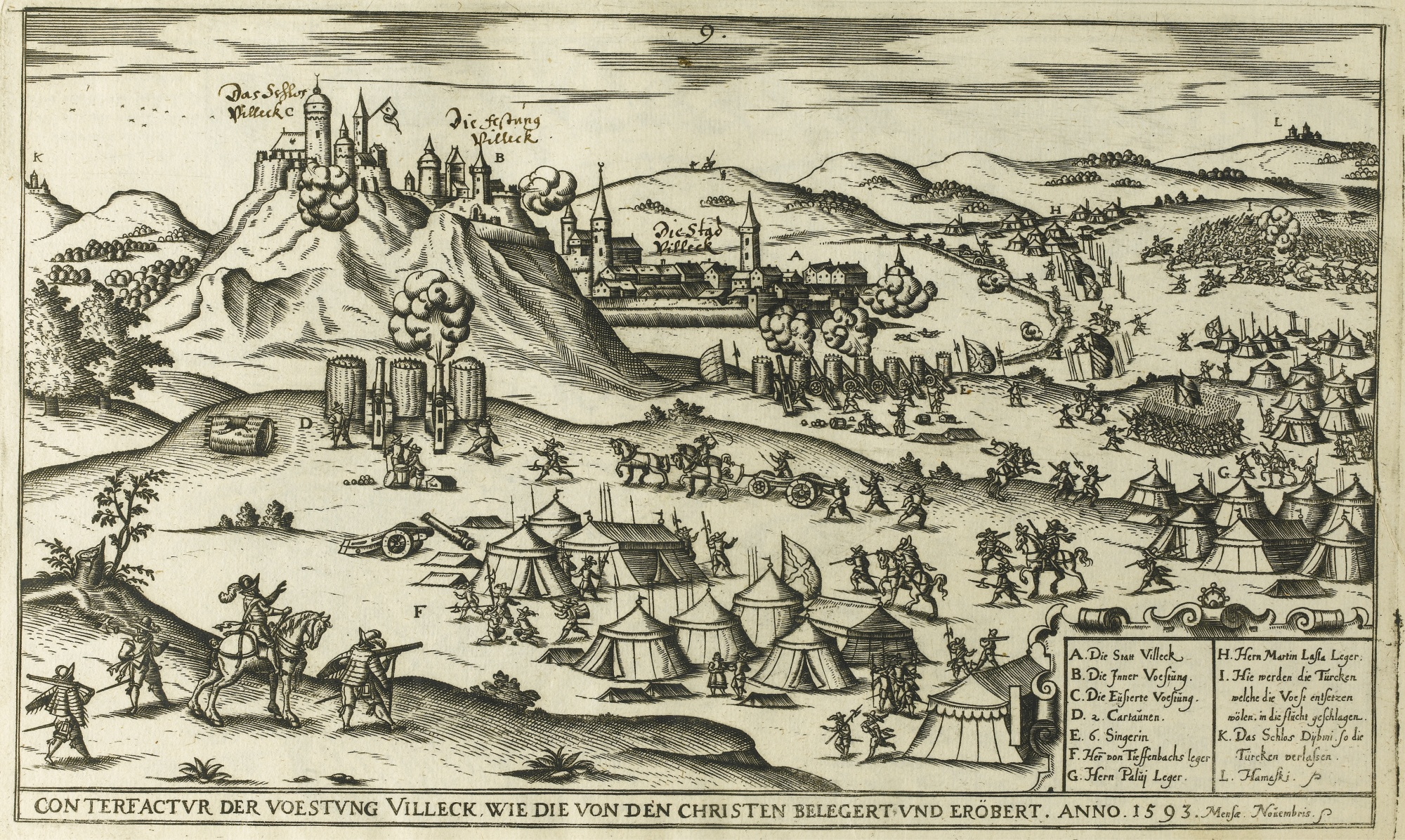
Imperial troops recaptured the castle from the Turks in 1593.

Frequent military unrest between the power groups of the Habsburg Empire and the emperor also forced rapid and repeated adjustments, in 1608, 1609, 1613 and again in 1619 (after the fire of 1615). In 1621–1623, the Betlenovci fought for the castle. The captain of the castle was Tamás Bosnyák of Magyarbél. During the Rákóczi Uprising, when Ferenc Wesselényi was the captain, the imperial army occupied the city. Both the castle and the city prospered. A watchtower was built on Červená skala and a garrison was permanently stationed on Strážná hora. Meetings and conferences of the surrounding counties were held in the castle.

The castle ruins have been conserved since 1972. After the reconstruction of the Bebek Bastion, an exhibition on the history of the castle and the city was set up there.

== Complex ==
The original castle in the 12th century consisted of a four-sided tower, a perimeter wall with a palace on the southwest side and probably a rampart with palisades. During the reconstruction in 1551, the castle was expanded with a middle castle with a pair of massive pentagonal bastions (the western one still bears the name of Bebek). In the 6 meter thick wall between them, 3 artillery positions and 6 niches for hook guns were established. A fence wall with a pair of round corner bastions was also built, which defined the access corridor to the middle castle.

== See also ==
- List of castles in Slovakia
- Fiľakovo Castle Museum
