= Nógrád County (historical county) =

County of the Kingdom of Hungary

Nógrád County Comitatus Neogradiensis (Latin) Nógrád vármegye (Hungarian) Komitat Neograd (German) Novohradská župa (Slovak)
- County of the Kingdom of Hungary (11th century-1923, 1938-1945)
- Coat of arms

- Capital: Balassagyarmat
- Area
  - Coordinates: 48°5′N 19°18′E
  - 1910: 4,128 km^{2} (1,594 sq mi)
- Population
  - 1910: 261,517
- History
  - Established: 11th century
  - Treaty of Trianon: 4 June 1920
  - Merged into Nógrád-Hont County: 1923
  - County recreated (First Vienna Award): 1938
  - Remerged into Nógrád-Hont County: 1945
- Today part of: Hungary (2,381 km^{2}); Slovakia (1,747 km^{2})

Nógrád (Hungarian; Latin: comitatus Neogradiensis, German: Neuburg or Neograd, Slovak: Novohrad) was an administrative county (comitatus) of the Kingdom of Hungary. Its territory is now divided between Hungary and Slovakia. The name Novohrad is still used in Slovakia as an informal designation of the corresponding territory. The name is derived from the former Nógrád castle in Hungary.

== Geography ==
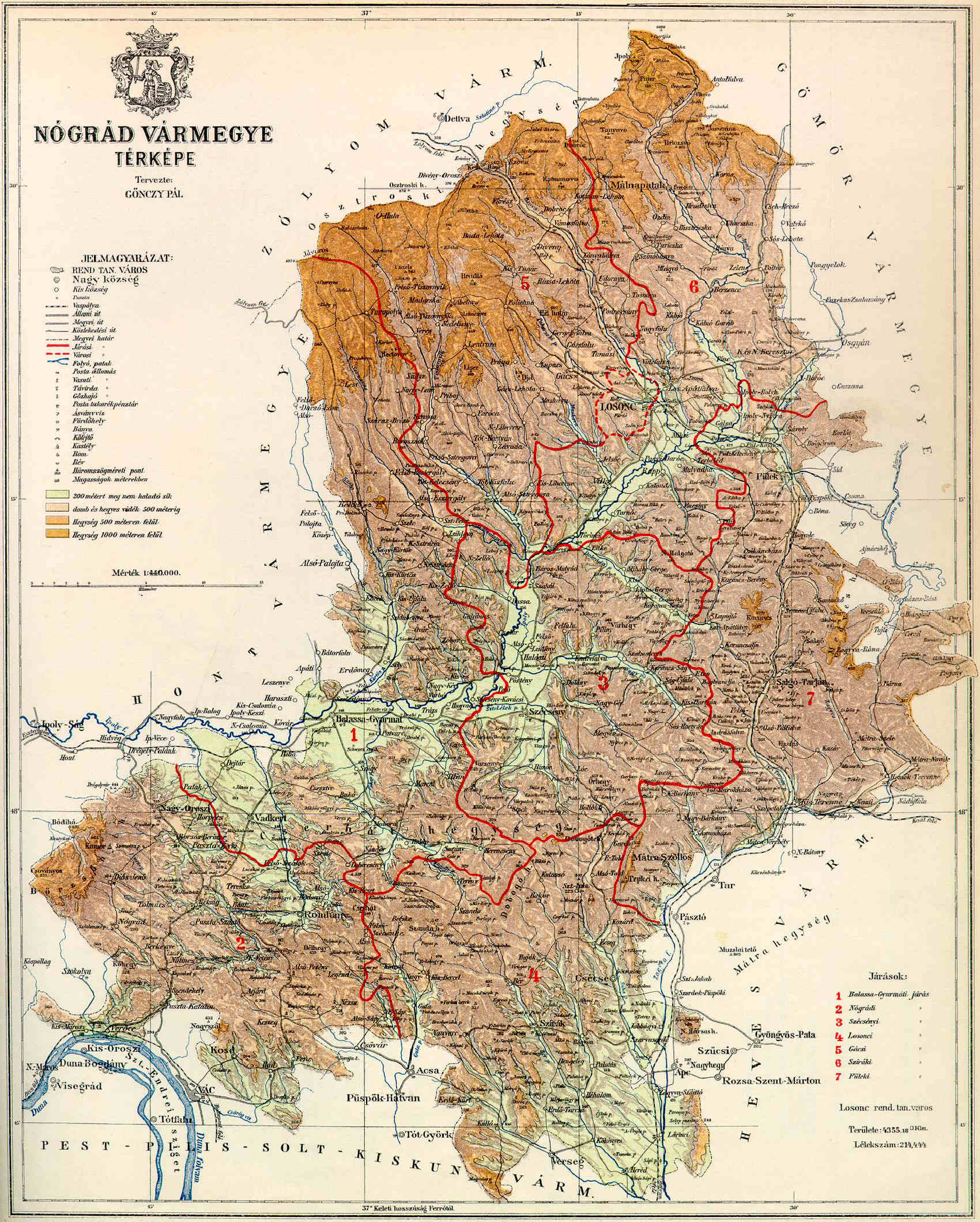
Map of Nógrád, 1891.

In 1910, Nógrád county shared borders with the counties of Hont, Zólyom, Gömör-Kishont, Heves and Pest-Pilis-Solt-Kiskun. It was situated approximately along the line Poltár, Losonc (today Lučenec), Szécsény and Vác. The river Ipoly (Slovak: Ipeľ) flowed through the county. Its area was 4,133 km^{2} around 1910.

== Capitals ==
The capital of the county was Balassagyarmat, except for the 18th century, when the capital was Losonc.

== History ==
Nógrád was one of the first counties of the Kingdom of Hungary, founded in the 11th century. Large part of its territory was ruled by the Ottoman Empire from 1541 to 1595, and from 1605 to 1686, as part of Budin Province and Eğri Province.

In the aftermath of World War I, the part of Nógrád county north of the river Ipeľ/Ipoly became part of newly formed Czechoslovakia (as Novohrad county), as recognized by the concerned states in 1920 by the Treaty of Trianon. The southern part stayed in Hungary and was merged with the Hungarian part of Hont county to form Nógrád-Hont County in 1923. Following the provisions of the First Vienna Award, the northern half of the county was redeemed thus and the county had was recreated in 1938. After World War II, the Trianon borders and Nógrád-Hont County were restored. In 1950 the county was again recreated after some of its parts were passed to the newly formed Pest County and the reorganized Heves County.

In 1993, Czechoslovakia dissolved and Novohrad became part of independent Slovakia. Since 1996, it has been part of the Slovak administrative unit Banska Bystrica region.

== Demographics ==
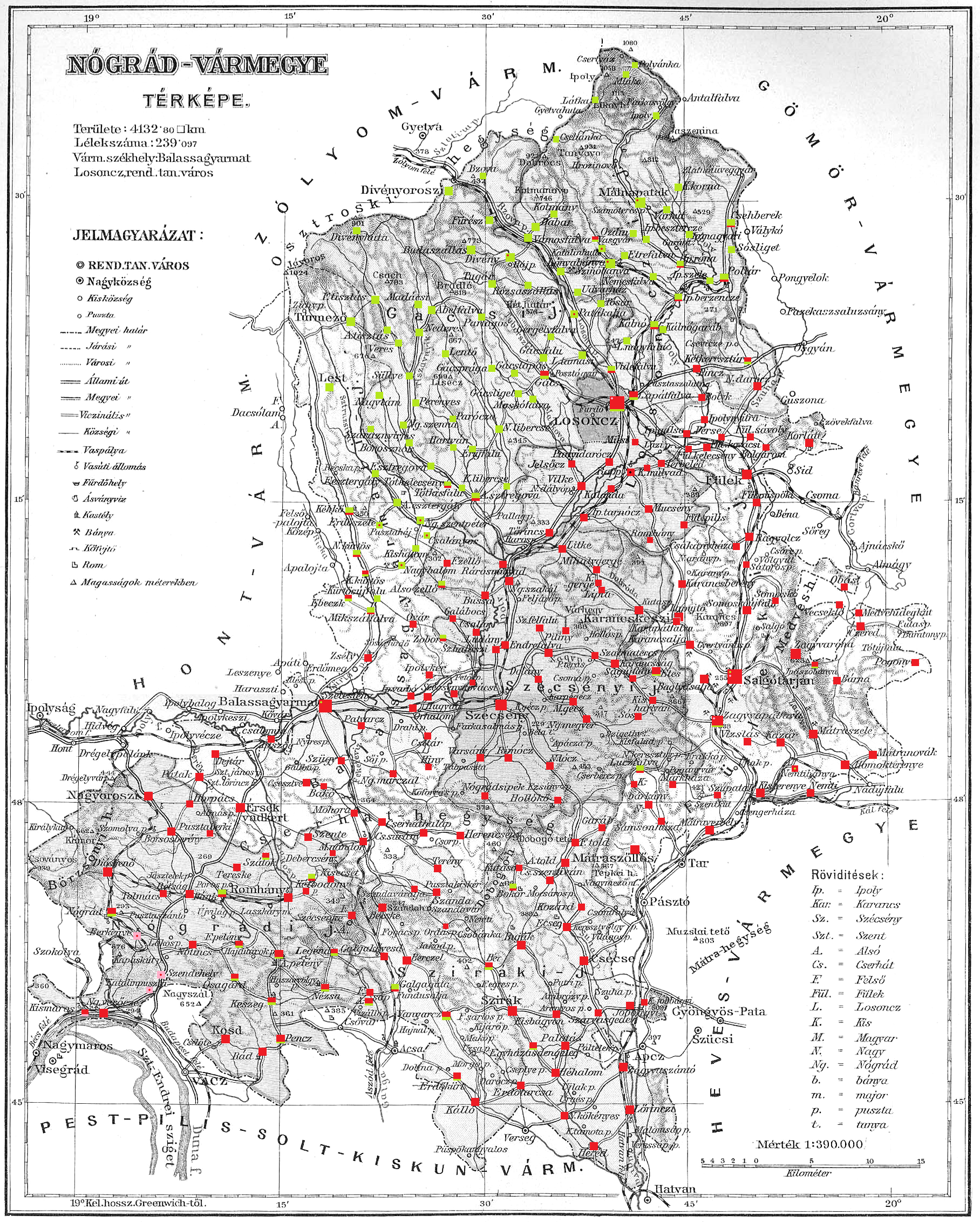
Ethnic map of the county with data of the 1910 census (see the key in the description).

Population by mother tongue (Note: Only linguistic communities > 1% are displayed.)
Census	Total	Hungarian	Slovak	German	Other or unknown
1880	191,678	118,188 (64.02%)	59,650 (32.31%)	4,747 (2.57%)	2,025 (1.10%)
1890	214,444	148,357 (69.18%)	59,440 (27.72%)	4,044 (1.89%)	2,603 (1.21%)
1900	239,097	168,614 (70.52%)	64,287 (26.89%)	3,958 (1.66%)	2,238 (0.94%)
1910	261,517	197,670 (75.59%)	58,337 (22.31%)	3,143 (1.20%)	2,367 (0.91%)

Population by religion (Note: Only religious communities > 1% are displayed.)
Census	Total	Roman Catholic	Lutheran	Jewish	Calvinist	Other or unknown
1880	191,678	131,954 (68.84%)	46,807 (24.42%)	9,011 (4.70%)	3,581 (1.87%)	325 (0.17%)
1890	214,444	151,541 (70.67%)	49,590 (23.12%)	9,439 (4.40%)	3,669 (1.71%)	205 (0.10%)
1900	239,097	172,804 (72.27%)	52,205 (21.83%)	9,541 (3.99%)	4,195 (1.75%)	352 (0.15%)
1910	261,517	193,449 (73.97%)	52,991 (20.26%)	9,641 (3.69%)	4,934 (1.89%)	502 (0.19%)

== Subdivisions ==
In the early 20th century, the subdivisions of Nógrád county were:

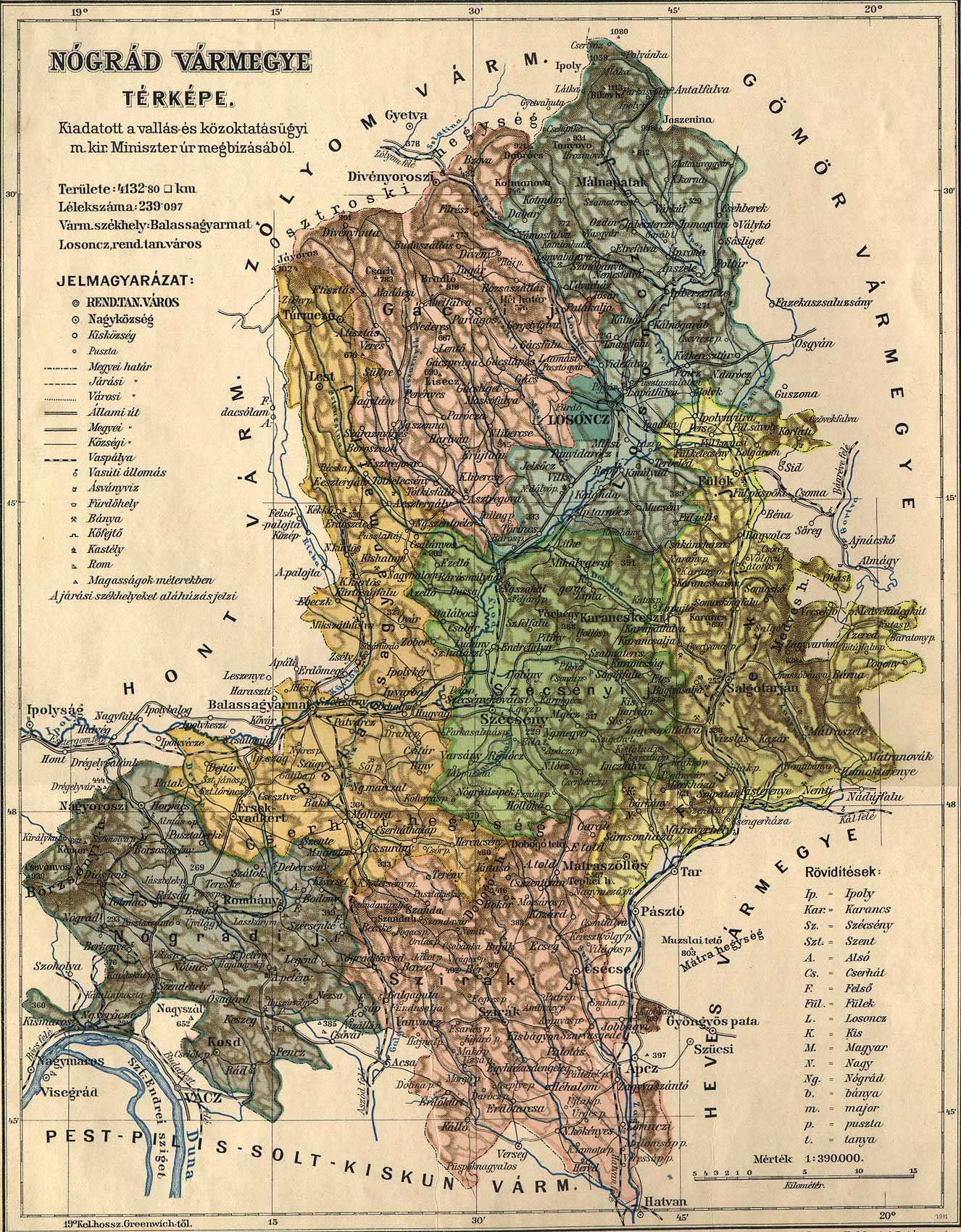

Districts (járás)
District	Capital
Balassagyarmat	Balassagyarmat
Gács	Gács (now Halič)
Losonc	Losonc (now Lučenec)
Nógrád	Rétság
Fülek	Salgótarján
Szécsény	Szécsény
Szirák	Szirák
Urban districts (rendezett tanácsú város)
Losonc (now Lučenec)

The municipalities of Lučenec, Fiľakovo and Halič are now in Slovakia.

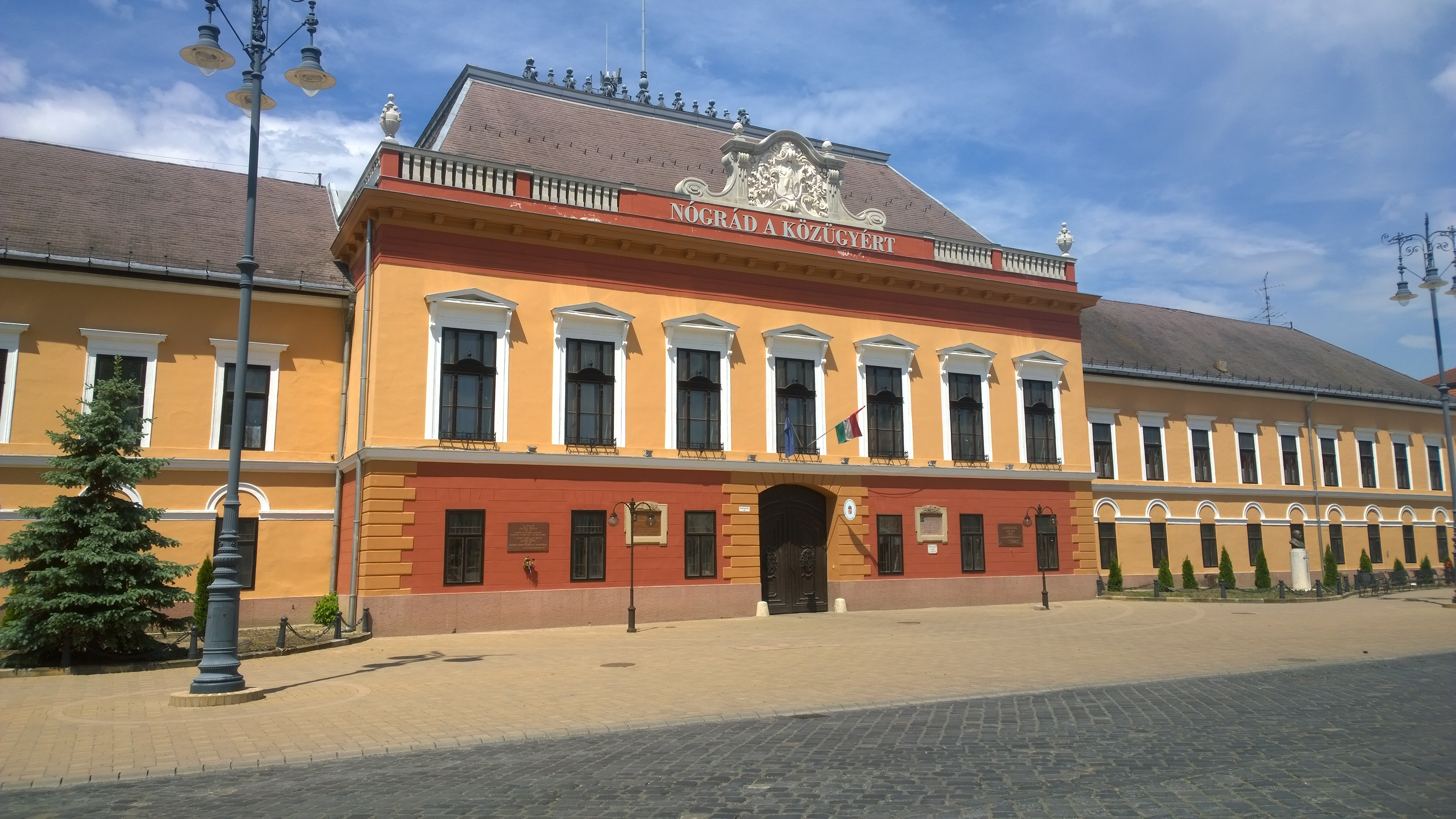
County Hall, Balassagyarmat

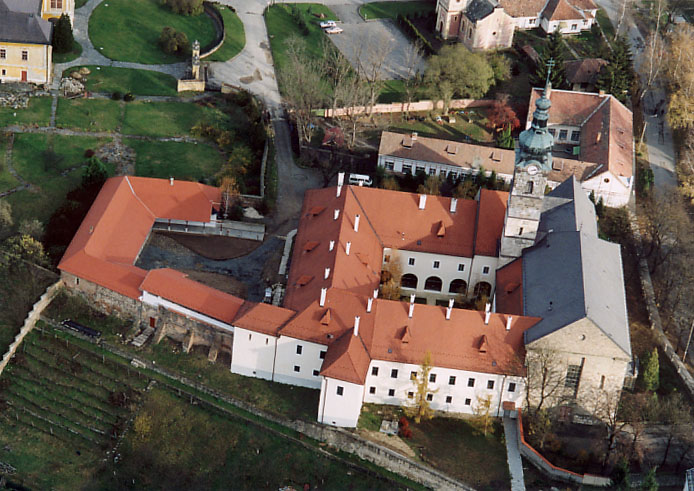
Franciscan Convent Szécsény – Aerial Photo

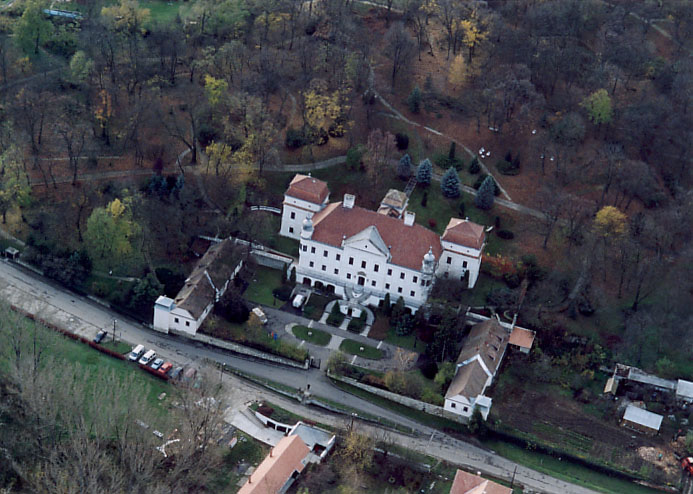
Szirák – Palace from above
