= Šiatorská Bukovinka =

Šiatorská Bukovinka Sátorosbánya
- Municipality
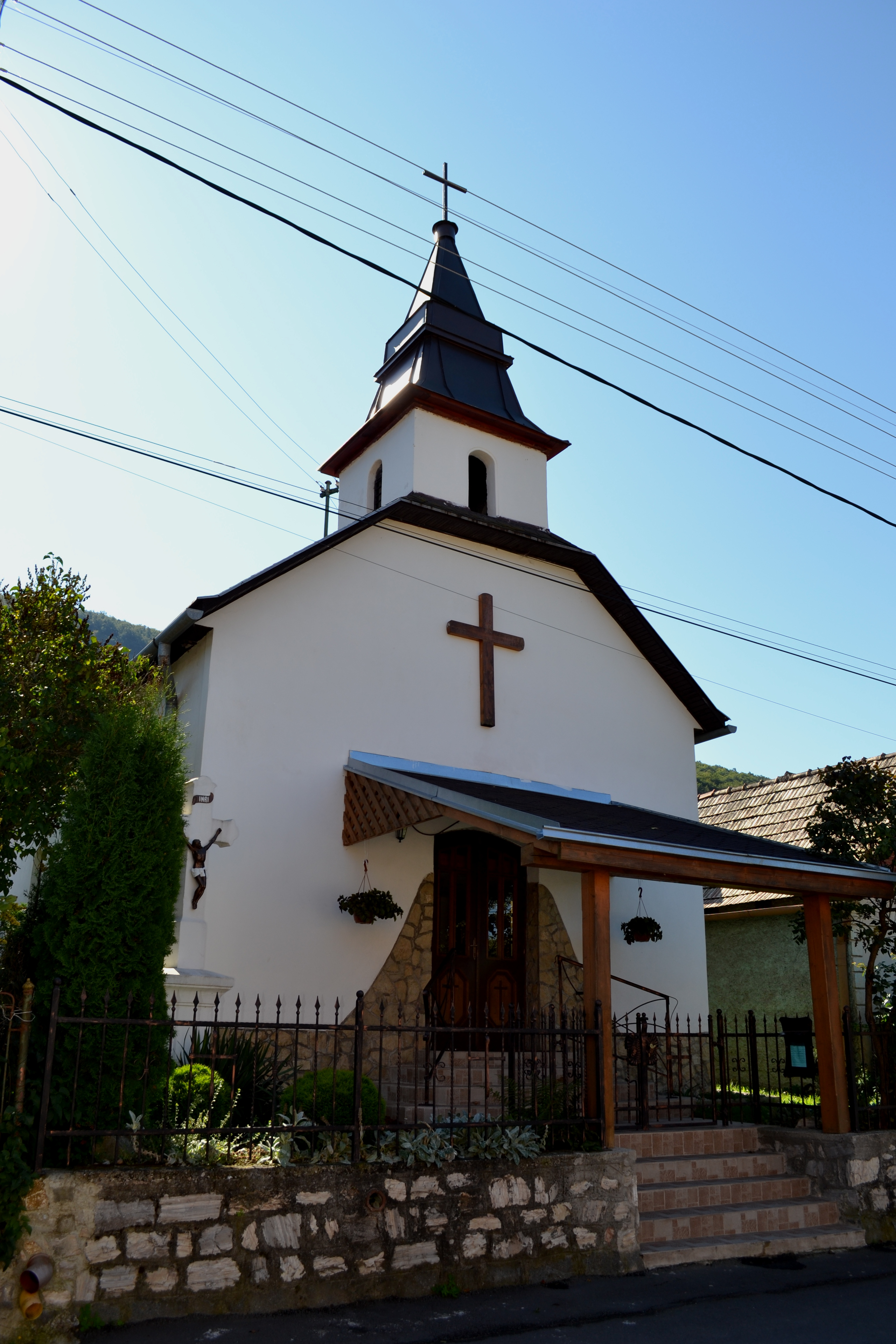
- Roman Catholic Church of St. Peter and Paul

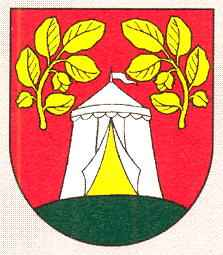
- Flag Coat of arms

- Location of Šiatorská Bukovinka in the Banská Bystrica Region Location of Šiatorská Bukovinka in Slovakia
- Coordinates: 48.18°N 19.82°E
- Country: Slovakia
- Region: Banská Bystrica Region
- District: Lučenec District
- First mentioned: 1959

Area
  - Total: 21.64 km^{2} (8.36 sq mi)
- Elevation: 305 m (1,001 ft)

Population (2025)
  - Total: 262
- Time zone: UTC+1 (CET)
  - Summer (DST): UTC+2 (CEST)
- Postal code: 985 58
- Area code: +421 47
- Vehicle registration plate (until 2022): LC
- Website: siatbukovinka.sk

Šiatorská Bukovinka (Hungarian: Sátorosbánya) is a village and municipality in the Lučenec District in the Banská Bystrica Region of Slovakia.

== Geography ==
The municipality lies at an altitude of 305 metres (1,001 ft) and covers an area of 21.64 km^{2} (8.36 sq mi) (2025).

== Population ==
Population statistic (10 years)
Year	1995	2005	2015	2025
Count	371	328	318	262
Difference		−11.59%	−3.04%	−17.61%

Population statistic
Year	2024	2025
Count	262	262
Difference		+0%

It has a population of 262 people (31 December 2025).

=== Ethnicity ===
Census 2021 (1+ %)
Ethnicity	Number	Fraction
Slovak	260	89.96%
Hungarian	28	9.68%
Not found out	11	3.8%
Total	289	

In year 2021 was 289 people by ethnicity 260 as Slovak, 28 as Hungarian, 11 as Not found out, 2 as Russian, 1 as Czech, 1 as Italian, 1 as Austrian and 1 as Other.

Note on population: The difference values of population numbers in the table "Population statistic" and in the sections "Ethnicity" & "Religion" is caused by the use of various statistical methods.

=== Religion ===
Census 2021 (1+ %)
Religion	Number	Fraction
Roman Catholic Church	204	70.59%
None	71	24.57%
Not found out	5	1.73%
Evangelical Church	5	1.73%
Ad hoc movements	3	1.04%
Total	289	

In year 2021 was 289 people by religion 204 from Roman Catholic Church, 71 from None, 5 from Not found out, 5 from Evangelical Church, 3 from Ad hoc movements and 1 from Greek Catholic Church.
