= Fiľakovo =

Fiľakovo Fülek
- Municipality
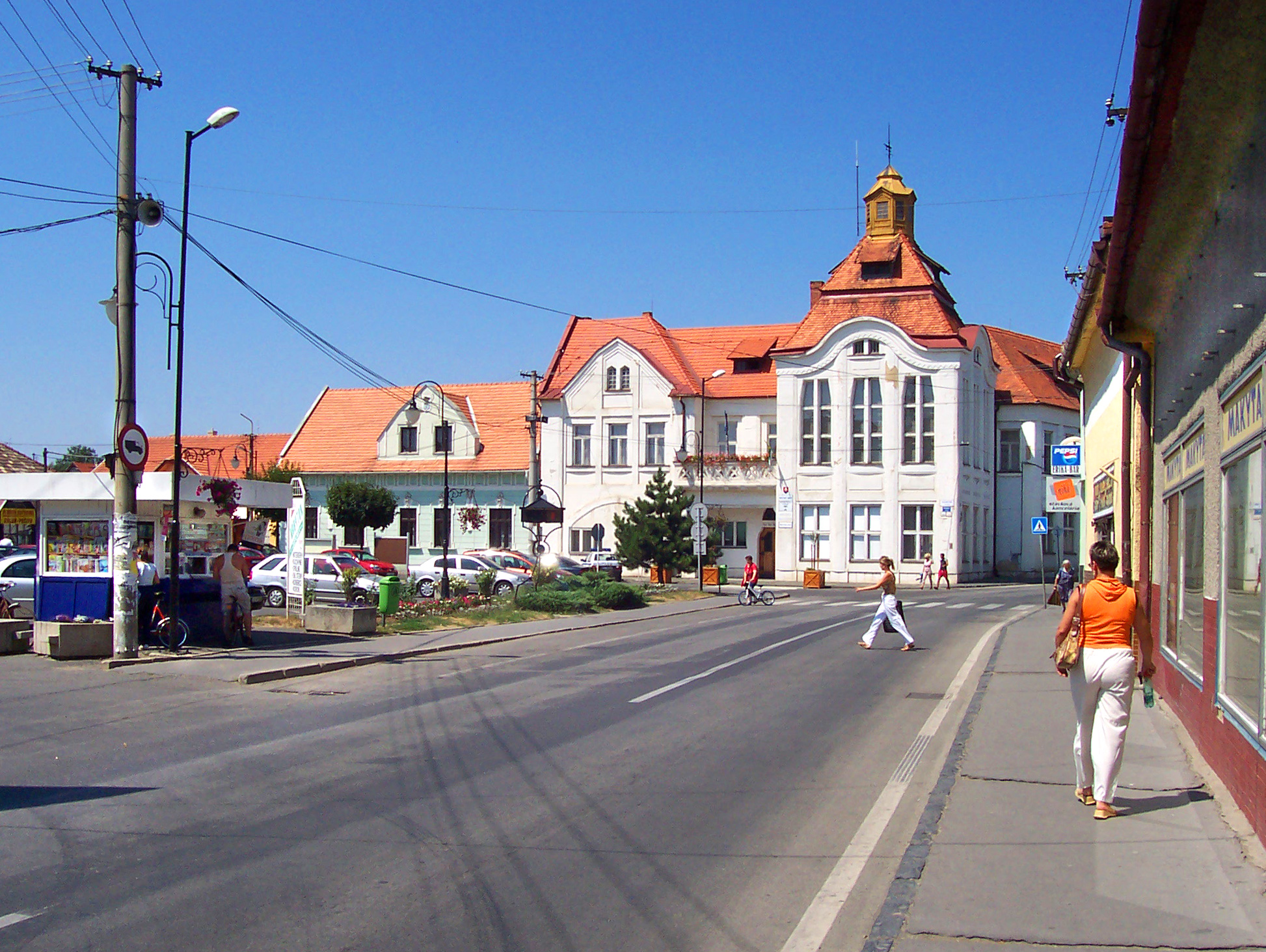
- Fiľakovo town square

- Flag Coat of arms

- Location of Fiľakovo in the Banská Bystrica Region Location of Fiľakovo in Slovakia
- Coordinates: 48.27°N 19.82°E
- Country: Slovakia
- Region: Banská Bystrica Region
- District: Lučenec District
- First mentioned: 1246

Government
  - Mayor: Attila Agócs (MOST-HÍD)

Area
  - Total: 16.19 km^{2} (6.25 sq mi)
- Elevation: 190 m (620 ft)

Population (2025)
  - Total: 9,530
- Time zone: UTC+1 (CET)
  - Summer (DST): UTC+2 (CEST)
- Postal code: 986 01
- Area code: +421 47
- Vehicle registration plate (until 2022): LC
- Website: www.filakovo.sk

Fiľakovo (Slovak pronunciation: [ˈfiʎakɔʋɔ]; Hungarian: Fülek, German: Fülleck, Turkish: Filek) is a town in the Banská Bystrica Region of south-central Slovakia.

Historically as part of Upper Hungary, it was located in Nógrád County (Slovak: Novohrad, lit. 'new castle').

== Geography ==
The municipality lies at an altitude of 190 metres (620 ft) and covers an area of 16.19 km^{2} (6.25 sq mi) (2025).

It is located in the Cerová vrchovina hills, in the valley of the Belina brook, located around 20 km (12.43 mi) from the Hungarian city of Salgótarján, 85 km (52.82 mi) from Banská Bystrica, about 150 km (93.21 mi) from Košice and around 220 km (136.70 mi) from Bratislava.

== History ==
The first written record of the town, along with the Fiľakovo Castle is from 1242, where the castle withstood the Mongol invasions. It is mentioned in 1246 as Filek. In 1423 the town received municipal privileges. In 1553 the town with the castle was conquered by the Turks and was the seat of a sanjak until 1593, when it was reconquered by the Imperial troops. However, it was conquered once more by the Ottomans in 1662 and the town along with the castle was burned down in 1682 by troops of Imre Thököly. It was finally passed to Austrians in 1686. Before the establishment of independent Czechoslovakia in 1918, it was part of Nógrád County within the Kingdom of Hungary. It again belonged to Hungary from 1938 to 1945 as a result of the First Vienna Award.

== Population ==
Historical population
Year	Pop.	±%
1970	7,880	—
1980	9,390	+19.2%
1991	10,165	+8.3%
2001	10,198	+0.3%
2011	10,817	+6.1%
2021	9,949	−8.0%
Source: Censuses

Population statistic (10 years)
Year	1995	2005	2015	2025
Count	10,268	10,362	10,687	9530
Difference		+0.91%	+3.13%	−10.82%

Population statistic
Year	2024	2025
Count	9623	9530
Difference		−0.96%

It has a population of 9530 people (31 December 2025).

=== Ethnicity ===
Census 2021 (1+ %)
Ethnicity	Number	Fraction
Hungarian	6578	66.11%
Slovak	3222	32.38%
Romani	1122	11.27%
Not found out	639	6.42%
Total	9949	

In year 2021 was 9949 people by ethnicity 6578 as Hungarian, 3222 as Slovak, 1122 as Romani, 639 as Not found out, 35 as Czech, 14 as German, 14 as Other, 10 as Chinese, 9 as Romanian, 6 as Polish, 5 as Ukrainian, 5 as Russian, 4 as Italian, 3 as Serbian, 2 as Jewish, 2 as Vietnamese, 2 as Turkish, 1 as Irish, 1 as Austrian, 1 as French, 1 as English and 1 as Albanian.

Note on population: The difference values of population numbers in the table "Population statistic" and in the sections "Ethnicity" & "Religion" is caused by the use of various statistical methods.

=== Religion ===
Census 2021 (1+ %)
Religion	Number	Fraction
Roman Catholic Church	5950	59.81%
None	2478	24.91%
Not found out	902	9.07%
Evangelical Church	157	1.58%
Calvinist Church	130	1.31%
Christian Congregations in Slovakia	103	1.04%
Total	9949	

In year 2021 was 9949 people by religion 5950 from Roman Catholic Church, 2478 from None, 902 from Not found out, 157 from Evangelical Church, 130 from Calvinist Church, 103 from Christian Congregations in Slovakia, 84 from Jehovah's Witnesses, 50 from Greek Catholic Church, 21 from Seventh-day Adventist Church, 19 from Other and not ascertained christian church, 16 from Other, 12 from Buddhism, 8 from Ad hoc movements, 7 from Baptists Church, 3 from Paganism and natural spirituality, 3 from Islam, 2 from Jewish community, 2 from Eastern Orthodox Church, 1 from Old Catholic Church and 1 from Church of Jesus Christ of Latter-day Saints.

== Twin towns — sister cities ==
Fiľakovo is twinned with:

- Bátonyterenye, Hungary
- Salgótarján, Hungary
- Szécsény, Hungary
- Szigethalom, Hungary
- Ustrzyki Dolne, Poland

== People ==
- Sándor Büchler, rabbi, historian
- Frank Lowy, Australian businessman
- Allan Vilhan, musician
- Vica Kerekes, actress

== Gallery ==
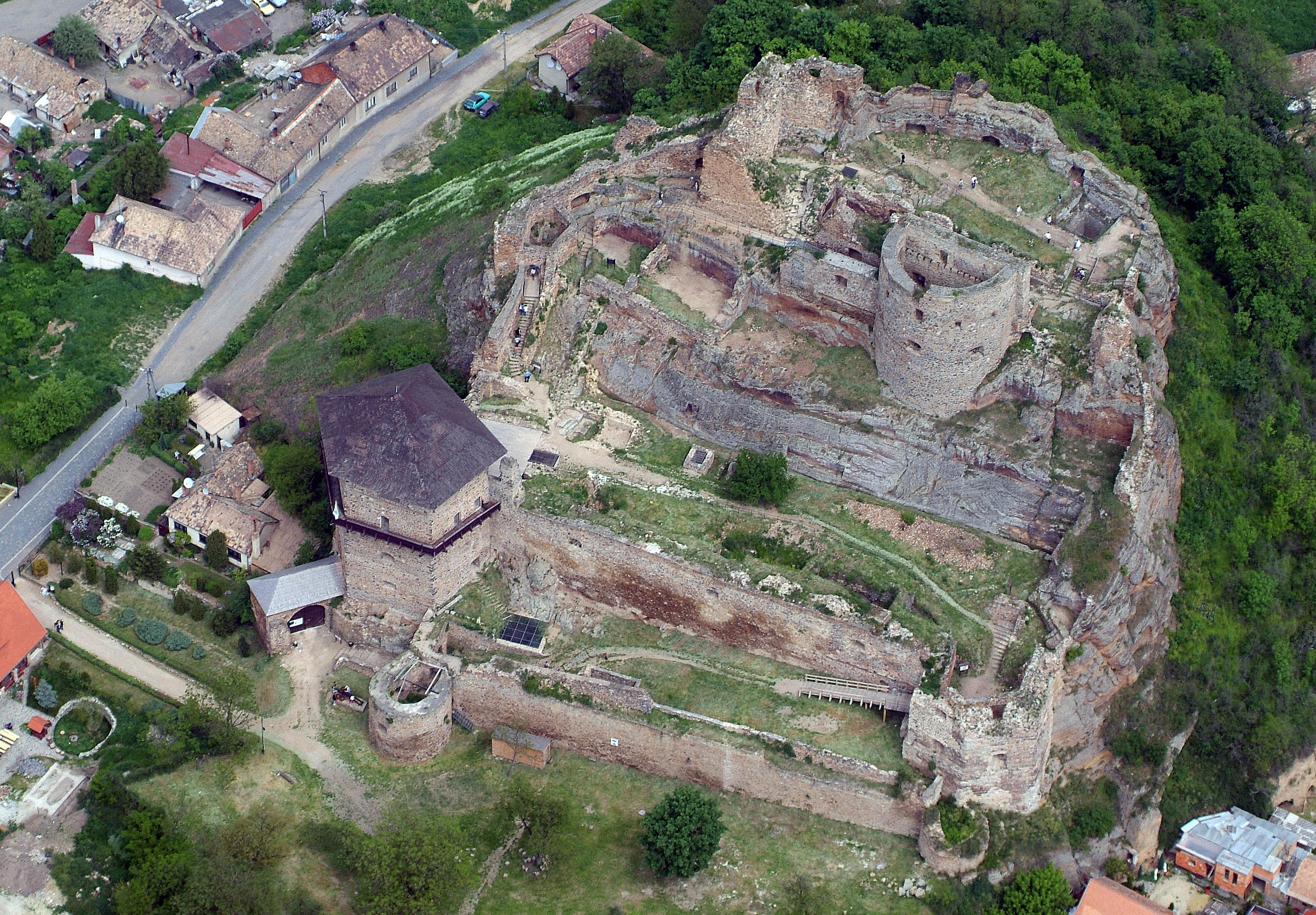
Aerial photography of the castle

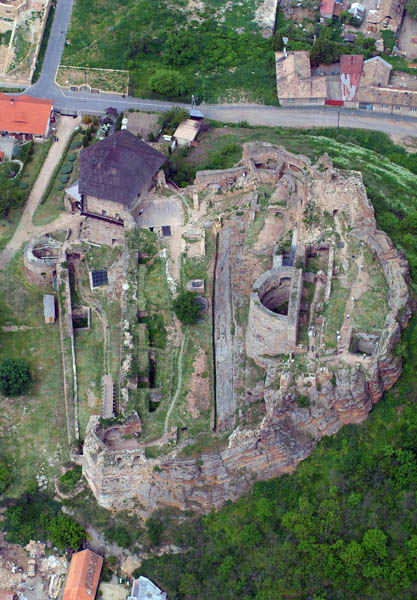

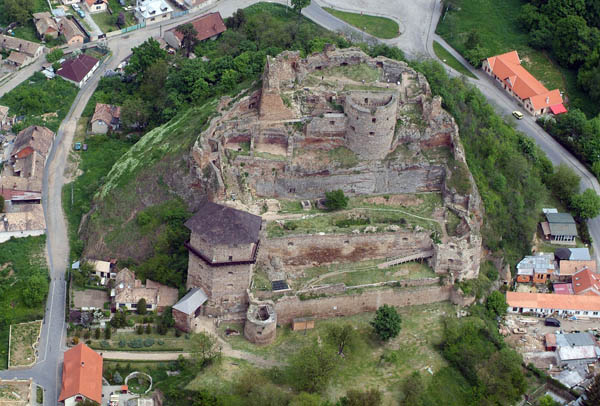

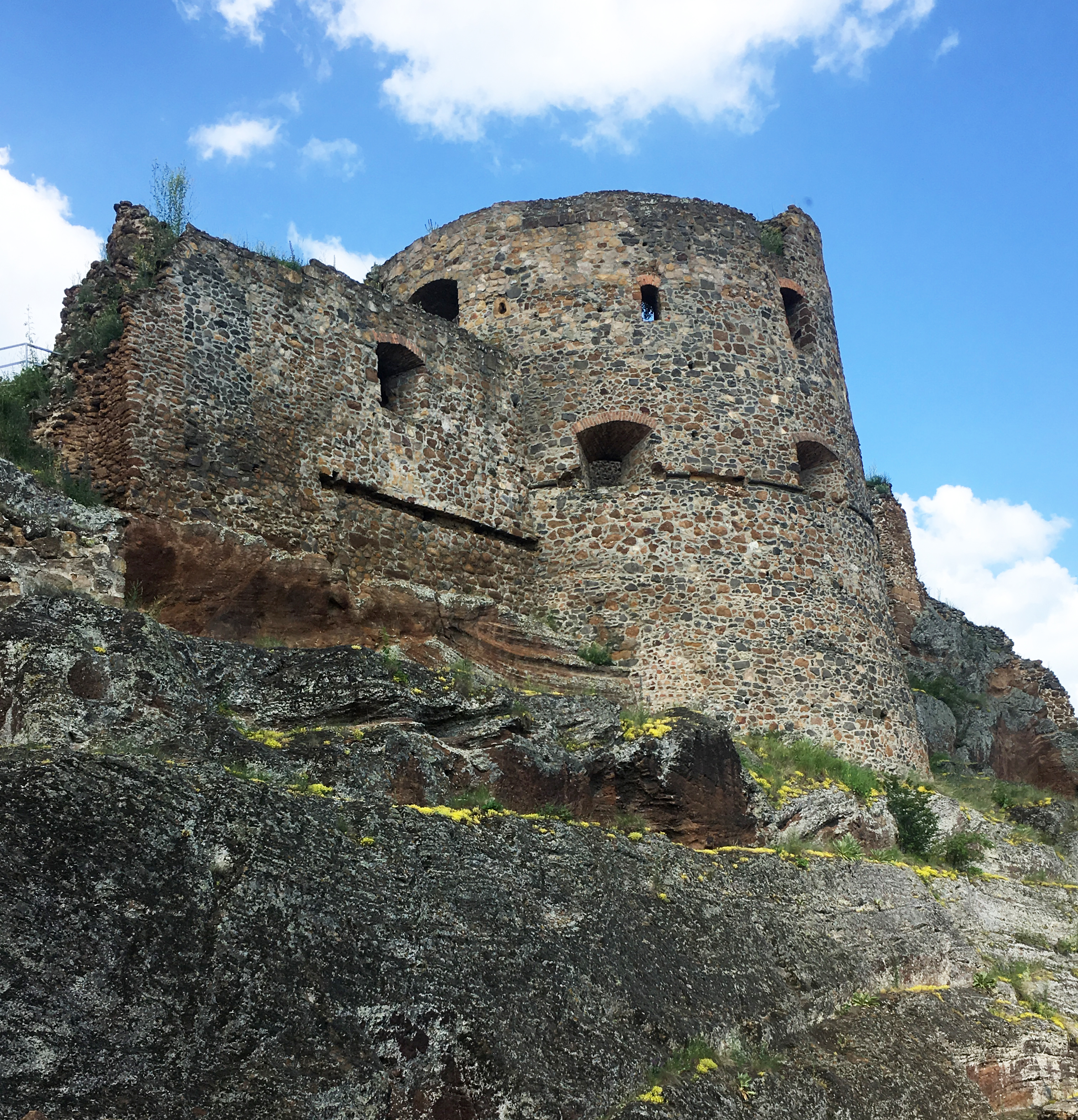
Fiľakovo castle.

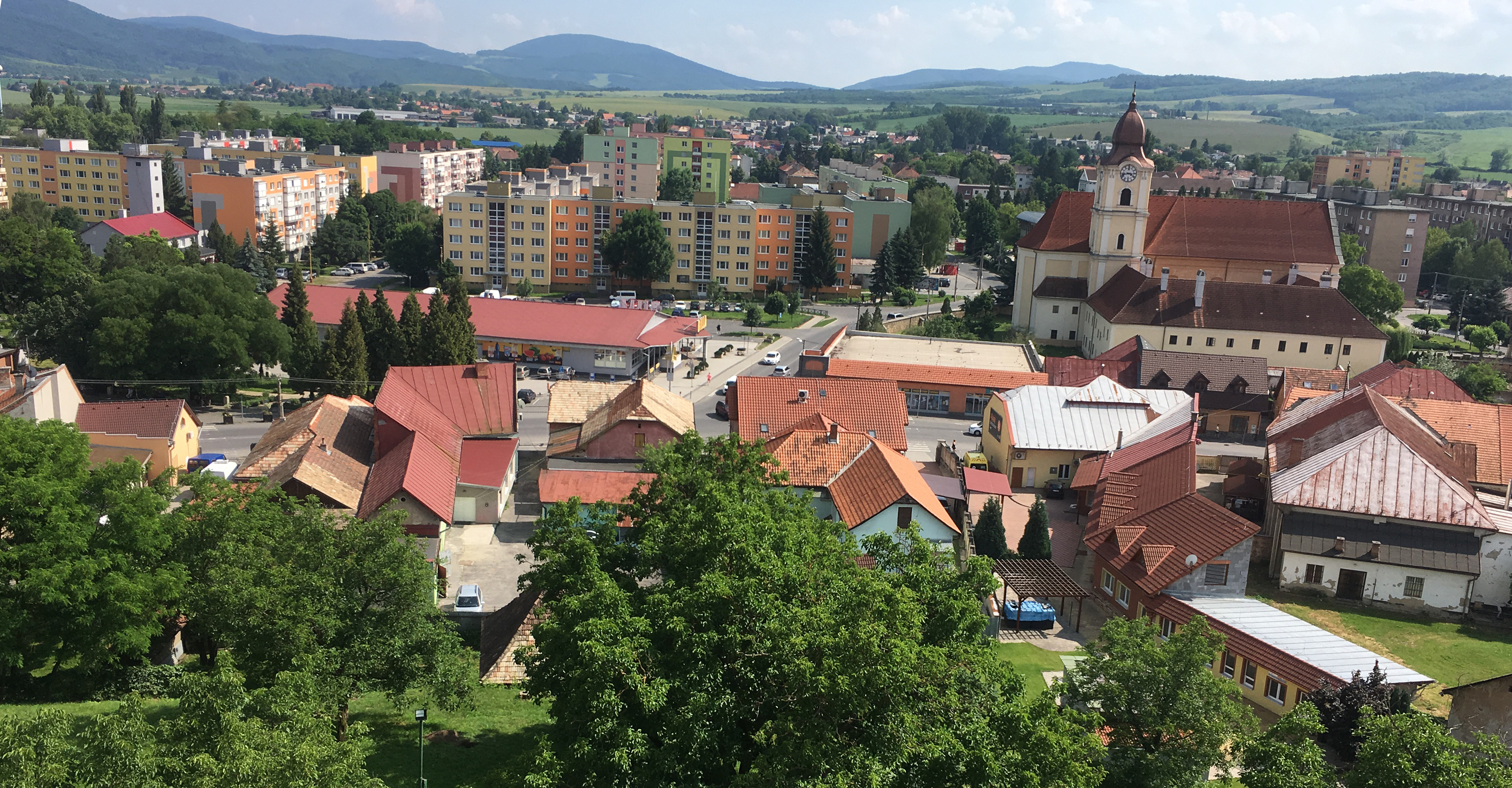
Fiľakovo viewed from the castle.

== See also ==
- List of municipalities and towns in Slovakia

== Genealogical resources ==
The records for genealogical research are available at the state archive "Statny Archiv in Banska Bystrica, Slovakia"

- Roman Catholic church records (births/marriages/deaths): 1700-1893 (parish A)
- Lutheran church records (births/marriages/deaths): 1783-1895 (parish B)
- Reformated church records (births/marriages/deaths): 1800-1895 (parish B)
