= Kubin =

Kubin may refer to:

== Places ==
- Kubin, a village in Azerbaijan
- Dolný Kubín, a town in Slovakia
- Kovin (German: Kubin), a town in Serbia
- Kubin, a town on Moa Island in Australia
  - Kubin Airport
- Vyšný Kubín, a village in Slovakia

== People ==
Kubín is a surname of Czech origin. The word is derived from the given name Kuba, a diminutive of Jakub.

- Alfred Kubin (1877–1959), Austrian painter and printmaker
- Felix Kubin (born 1969), German musician
- Jaroslav Kubín (1947–2025), Czech politician
- Kip Kubin (born 1965), American film director
- Larry Kubin (born 1959), American football player
- Maria Kubin (born 1966), Austrian Old Catholic bishop
- Otakar Kubín (1883–1969), Czech painter and sculptor
- Tomáš Kubín (born 1962), Czech politician
- Wolfgang Kubin (born 1945), German poet and translator
