= János Fábry =

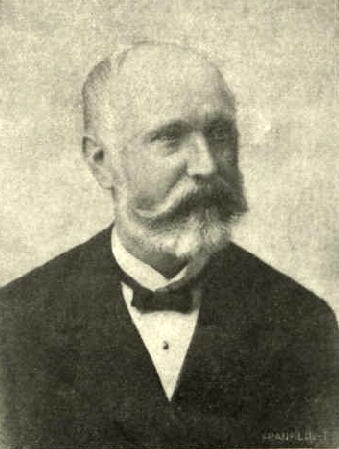
- János Fábry
- Born: July 31, 1830; Lučenec, Kingdom of Hungary, Austrian Empire
- Died: December 30, 1907 (aged 77); Rimavská Sobota, Kingdom of Hungary, Austria-Hungary
- Occupations: Museologist, botanist, educator, museum director
- Children: 5 (including Zoltán Fábry)

János Fábry (31 July 1830 – 30 December 1907) was a Hungarian museologist, botanist, teacher, and school principal, best known as the founder and first director of the Gemer-Malohont Museum in Rimavská Sobota.

== Life and career ==
Fábry completed his secondary education in his hometown of Lučenec and in Banská Štiavnica. In Lučenec, his teacher Mihály Szilniczky introduced him to botany. He later studied natural history in Prešov under the guidance of noted botanists Frigyes Ákos Hazslinszky and András Vandrák.

During the Hungarian Revolution of 1848, Fábry joined the revolutionary forces as an artilleryman and later served as an adjutant officer. Following the Hungarian surrender at Világos in 1849, he worked as a private tutor in Jánosi (now Janice) in Gömör County. In 1850, he became a teacher at the Evangelical Gymnasium in Ožďany. In 1854, he pursued further studies in physics, chemistry, and geology at the University of Vienna. Following the merger of the Ožďany and Rimavská Sobota gymnasiums, he continued his teaching career at the United Protestant Gymnasium in Rimavská Sobota, occasionally serving as its principal.

Among his students was the prominent Hungarian writer Kálmán Mikszáth, who fondly remembered Fábry in his novellas Kovászember and János Fábry, as well as in an obituary published in the weekly Vasárnapi Ujság. Fábry taught natural sciences for 34 years and single-handedly built the school's essential scientific collections. Between 1868 and 1890, he also maintained and directed a state-subsidized higher girls' school.

Fábry was an active member of several scientific and cultural associations and served as an observer for the meteorological station in Rimavská Sobota. In September 1882, he founded the Gömör County Museum (now the Gemer-Malohont Museum), serving as its first and founding director. He also established the Museum Association, which operated until 1951 and was revived after the Fall of Communism.

As a botanist, Fábry spent 42 years collecting plants, resulting in a large herbarium. While some of his early published floral works contained errors, his massive collection remains historically valuable; a smaller part is kept in Cluj-Napoca and the Gemer-Malohont Museum, while the largest portion is preserved in the Slovak National Museum in Bratislava. He also established and expanded the museum's antiquities and numismatic collections.

During the 1850s and 1860s, Fábry contributed articles to periodicals such as Hon, Vasárnapi Ujság, and Politikai Ujdonságok. He published botanical papers in Magyar Növénytani Lapok (the botanist Aladár Richter named a new blackberry variety, Rubus Fabryi Richt. Al., in his honor). He was also a regular contributor to local regional weeklies and the linguistic journal Magyar Nyelvőr. He retired from active teaching in 1897, spending the last ten years of his life tending to his botanical collections.

== Descendants and legacy ==
Fábry had four daughters and one son, Zoltán Fábry, who later served as the police chief of Rimavská Sobota (died in 1943). His grandson, Zoltán Fábry Jr. (1911–1951), was a hussar major who was executed in Budapest during the Stalinist show trials in communist Hungary. He was posthumously rehabilitated and promoted to hussar colonel in 1991, and rests in the National Pantheon.

After 1990, the Gemer-Malohont Museum Association in Rimavská Sobota established the "János Fábry Prize" in his honor. In 2008, the prize was awarded to the Fábry family and accepted by his great-great-grandson, Szabolcs Fábry, the mayor of Nagyvázsony, Hungary.

A major downtown street leading to the museum in Rimavská Sobota is named after Fábry. In 2020, a bilingual (Slovak-Hungarian) temporary exhibition showcasing the museum founder's life's work opened at the Gemer-Malohont Museum.

== Works ==
- Igénytelen szó a hazai füvészet érdekében (An Unpretentious Word in the Interest of Domestic Botany), Magyar Sajtó, 1857.
- Rimaszombat viránya (The Flora of Rimavská Sobota), Rimaszombati Gimn. Ért. 1858–59.
- Adalékok a dísznövények történetéhez (Contributions to the History of Ornamental Plants), Rimaszombati Gimn. Ért. 1858–59.
- A szőlő története (The History of Grapes), Vasárnapi Ujság, 1863.
- Az állattan elemei (Elements of Zoology), Pest, 1864.
- A növénytan elemei (Elements of Botany), Pest, 1865.
- Gömörmegye viránya (The Flora of Gömör County), Pest, 1867.
- A Gömörmegyei Múzeum múltja és jelene (The Past and Present of the Gömör County Museum), Rimavská Sobota, 1905.

== Sources ==
- Szinnyei, József. Magyar írók élete és munkái (in Hungarian). Vol. III.
- Aladár Richter: Fábry János, Erdélyi Múz. Egylet Évk., 1903.
- Gyula Klein: Fábry János, Növénytani Közlemények, 1908.
- Magyar életrajzi lexikon 1000–1990 (Hungarian Biographical Lexicon).
