= Ladislav Luppa =

Politician (1884–1955)

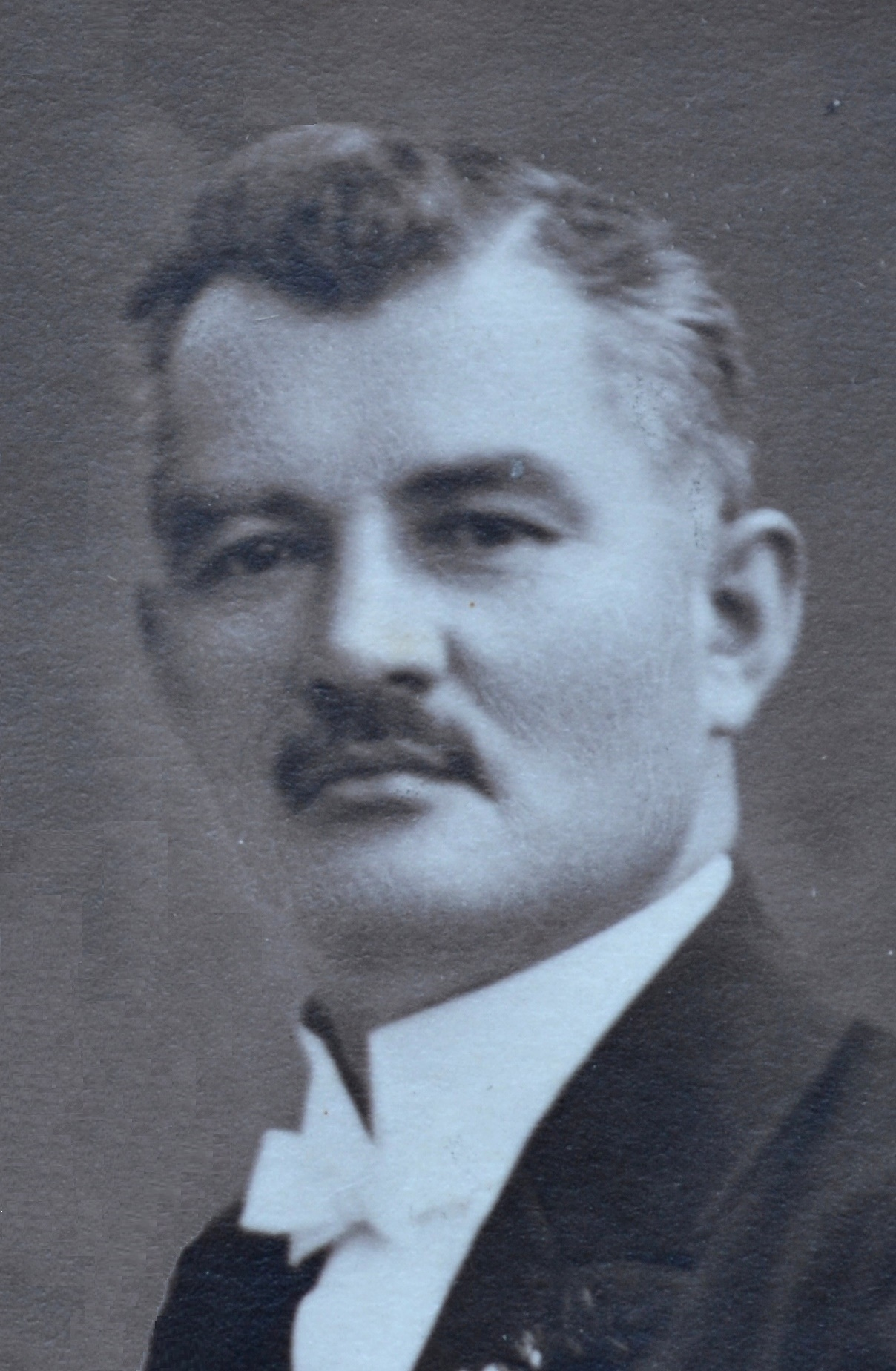
- Portrait of Ladislav Luppa from 1925
- Born: 13 April 1884; Lučenec, Austria-Hungary
- Died: 5 October 1955 (aged 71); Lučenec, Czechoslovakia
- Resting place: Lučenec
- Other name: Luppa László
- Citizenship: Czechoslovak, Hungarian
- Occupations: Master butcher, regional politician
- Years active: 1919–1955
- Known for: Member of the Lučenec town council, head of the butchers' guild section
- Relatives: Ján Luppa (grandfather)

Notes
- Recipient of the Karl Troop Cross and the German Iron Cross

Ladislav Luppa (Hungarian: Luppa László; 13 April 1884 – 5 October 1955) was a regional politician active in the Felvidék region (southern Slovakia), a long-time member of the town council in Lučenec, an acclaimed master butcher, and a veteran of the First World War.

== Biography ==
Luppa was born on 13 April 1884 in Lučenec. He completed his secondary education at the Hungarian Royal State Main Gymnasium in Lučenec.

During the First World War, he was conscripted into the military and served a total of 45 months in active combat duties on the Russian and Italian fronts with the 25th Infantry Regiment. He completed his army service with the rank of sergeant (čatár). For his bravery in combat, he was awarded the Austro-Hungarian Karl Troop Cross and the German Iron Cross.

Following the establishment of the First Czechoslovak Republic, Luppa established an independent and successful trade in Lučenec in 1919. He became a prominent master butcher and sausage maker, operating his shop at the intersection of Vargova and Zelená streets.

In May 1938, Luppa entered local politics when he was elected to the Lučenec town council (képviselő-testület). Within the municipality, he served as the head of the butchers' guild section and held the position of vice-chairman of the local charitable association Jószív Asztaltársaság (Good Heart Society). He was heavily involved in the social life of the community. He is buried in the municipal cemetery in Lučenec.

== Family background and revolutionary heritage ==
Ladislav Luppa came from a respected, upper-middle-class Lutheran family based in Lučenec. The surname Luppa is exceptionally rare in the Novohrad region (covering the Lučenec and Veľký Krtíš districts) and is uniquely tied to this specific family lineage.

A notable figure in the family history was his grandfather, Ján Luppa (known in Hungarian as Luppa János), who fought in the Hungarian Revolution of 1848. He took part in the uprising as an insurgent in guerrilla units resisting oncoming troops. In August 1849, after Russian imperial forces captured and burned Lučenec to assist the Austrian Emperor, Ján Luppa was captured alongside other local citizens and rebels. The prisoners were subjected to torture by Russian troops, who whipped them and forced them to dig up and wash the decomposing bodies of fallen Russian officers with their bare hands. Amidst the chaos, he narrowly escaped execution by fleeing into the dense forests surrounding the Lučenec spa area.

This event and the account of the torture were recorded by János Fábry, a prominent citizen of Lučenec, in his memoirs. Fábry noted that Ján Luppa personally recounted the ordeal and showed him his healing wounds a month after the tragedy. Ján Luppa continued to live in the town as a respected resident and taxpayer until the early 20th century. His escape ensured the survival of the Luppa family line in the Novohrad region.

== Decorations ==
- Karl Troop Cross (Austria-Hungary)
- Iron Cross (German Empire)
