= Lučenec Synagogue =

Former Neolog synagogue, now cultural center, in Lučenec, Slovakia

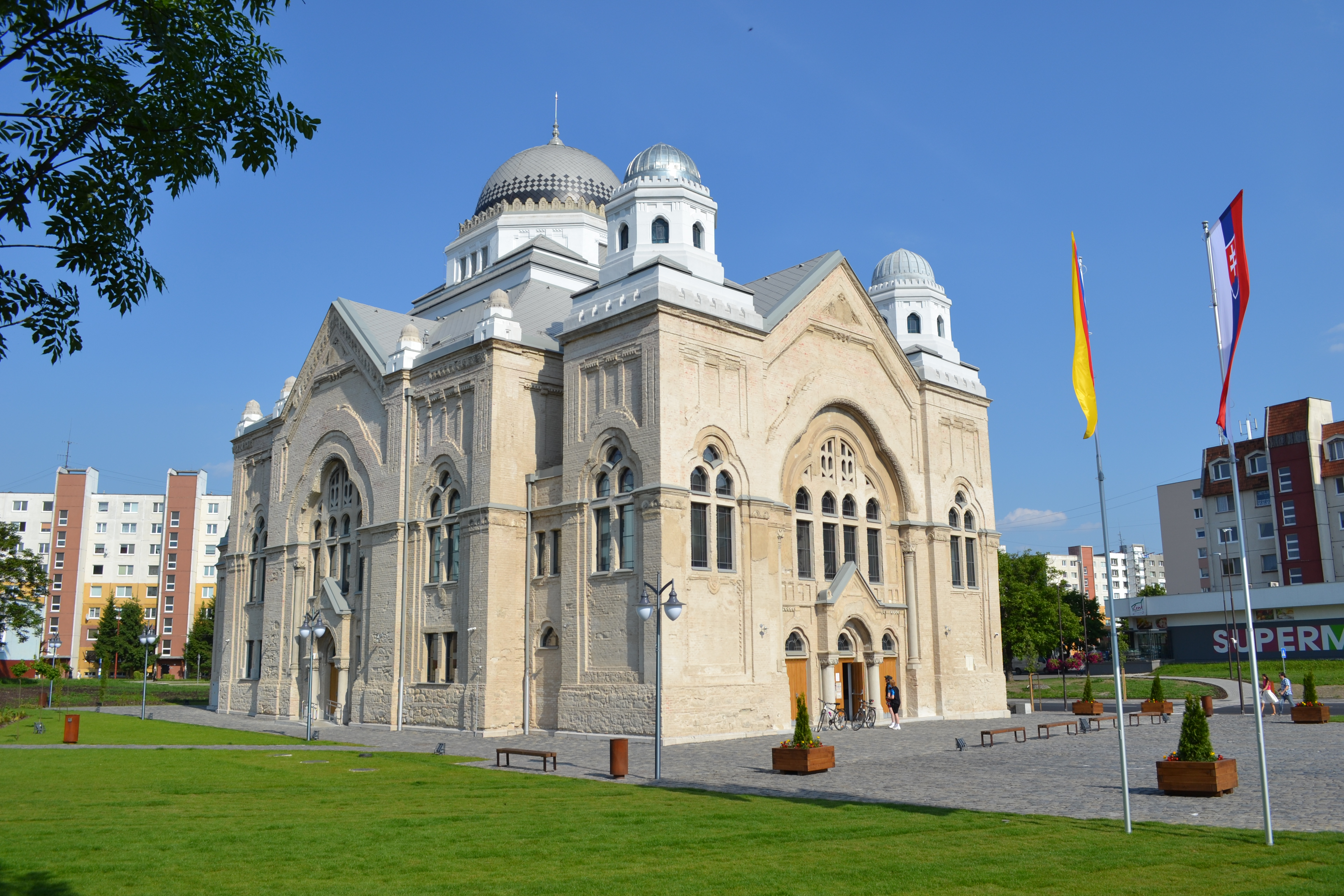
- The former synagogue in 2016

- Location of the synagogue in Slovakia

Religion
- Affiliation: Neolog Judaism (former)
- Rite: Nusach Ashkenaz
- Ecclesiastical or organisational status: Synagogue (1925–1944); Profane use (1950s–1980s); Cultural center (since 2016)
- Status: Inactive (as a synagogue); Repurposed

Location
- Location: 4 Adyho Street, Lučenec, Banská Bystrica
- Country: Slovakia
- Coordinates: 48°19′30″N 19°40′02″E

Architecture
- Architect: Lipót Baumhorn
- Type: Synagogue architecture
- Style: Secession; Art Nouveau
- Established: 1860s (as a congregation)
- Completed: 1925
- Construction cost: Kčs 1.5 million

Specifications
- Capacity: 1,100 worshipers
- Dome: One (maybe more)
- Materials: Reinforced concrete

The Lučenec Synagogue is a former Neolog congregation and synagogue, located in Lučenec, in the Banská Bystrica region of Slovakia. Completed in 1925 in the Secession style and is registered as a National Cultural Monument, the building was used as a synagogue until World War II. It was reconstructed and reopened as a cultural center on 13 May 2016.

== History ==
The synagogue was designed by the Hungarian architect Lipót Baumhorn to replace the older, dilapidated synagogue which had stood on the site since 1863. The domed structure is notable for its use of lightweight reinforced concrete.

The synagogue was officially opened on 8 September in 1925 and could accommodate up to 1,100 worshipers. The cost of the construction was around 1.5 million Kčs. The synagogue was used for religious services until 1944 when the interior of the synagogue was destroyed. The last rabbi of the synagogue was Arthur Rashovsky, who was killed in Auschwitz after the Jewish community of Lučenec was deported there on 12 June 1944.

The synagogue was partially restored after the war. Around the 1960s, the building was used as a warehouse for synthetic fertilizers, the presence of which caused serious damage to the fabric of the building. In 1980 the building fell out of use. Although it was listed as a historical monument in 1985, it gradually fell into disrepair.

== Reconstruction ==
Between 2014 and 2015, the synagogue was completely reconstructed. The project cost €2.5 million, of which €2.4 million was funded from an EU grant. The building is now operated as a Lučenec Cultural Quarter and is used for art events such as theater performances, concerts, exhibitions, and other cultural activities. The space can also be used for events such as graduation ceremonies, wedding receptions and public meetings. From September to November 2019, the synagogue also hosted a traveling exhibition of Chinese terracotta soldiers.

== See also ==
- History of the Jews in Slovakia
- List of cultural monuments in Lučenec
- List of synagogues in Slovakia
