= Timrava =

Božena Slančíková
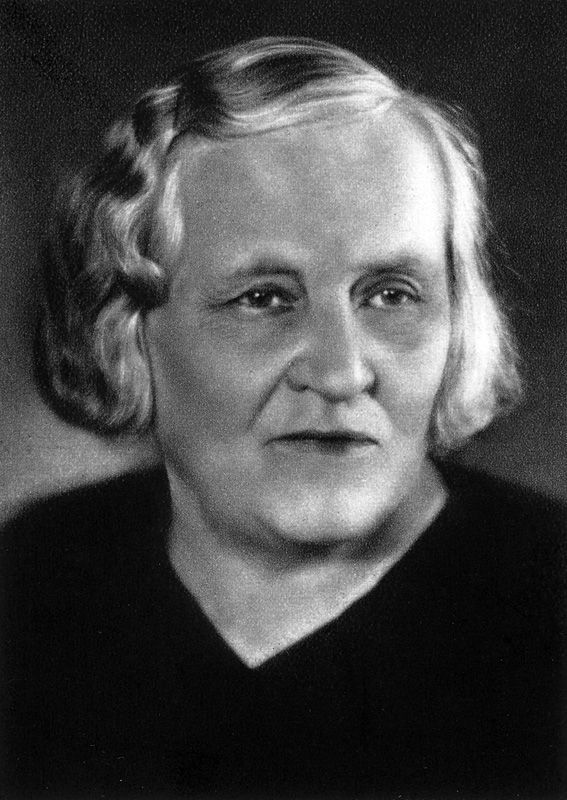
- Timrava (Božena Slančíková)
- Born: 2 October 1867; Polichno, Austria-Hungary
- Died: 27 November 1951 (aged 84); Lučenec, Czechoslovakia
- Occupations: Novelist, short story writer and playwright

Božena Slančíková (October 2, 1867, Polichno - November 27, 1951, Lučenec ), better known by the pen name Timrava, was a Slovak novelist, short story writer and playwright. She also wrote under the name "Aunt Polichna". "Timrava" was taken from the name of a popular small lake with a fountain, where she liked to sit while writing.

== Biography ==
She was born into the family of Paul Slančík, a Lutheran pastor and one of the co-founders of Matica Slovenská. She had ten siblings of whom six survived to adulthood. At fifteen, she briefly attended a public boarding school at Banská Bystrica. Otherwise she was home schooled for most of her early life. She lived with her father until his death in 1909.

Although she made several attempts to leave, she had little success finding a job. For three months, she was a companion to a wealthy widow in Dolný Kubín, and later became the caretaker of collections at the Slovak National Museum in Martin, but this also lasted only for a short time. After her father's death, she moved in with her mother, near her twin brother's rectory in the village of Ábelová, two miles west of Polichno. While at Martin, she had made the acquaintance of Elena Maróthy-Šoltésová, a member of the Slovak women's movement, who encouraged her to be a writer. Royalties, however, were slim and she was forced to take a position as a kindergarten teacher; a post she held from 1919-1929, when she retired.

Her small pension was not sufficient and the royalties from her writing didn't increase, so she moved to Lučenec in 1945, to live with relatives. In 1947, she was awarded the title of "National Artist".

== Writing ==
Although she lived in relative seclusion for her entire life, she had meetings with many eminent Slovak cultural figures such as the poet Kolomon Banšell, Ema Goldpergerová (one of the co-founders of the Slovak National Museum) and Olga Petianová (Štefan Krčméry's mother). Her first works were issued in a handwritten journal called "Ratolest" (Sprig), produced together with her sister Irene. Satirical verses comprised most of her early works, but she eventually turned to novels and short stories, with an occasional play. Her writings describe people and their thoughts, as well as offering some critical commentary on political and ethnic issues. The stories usually take place in a village or small town in her native region, and many of them are based on her own experiences. Although love is often the principal motive in her stories, she never became sentimental, which was the tendency of most earlier Slovak prose.

== In English ==
- That Alluring Land : Slovak Stories, translated and edited by Norma L. Rudinsky. University of Pittsburgh Press, (1992) ISBN 0-8229-3709-3
