= Juraj Laštík =

Slovak ski mountaineer

Personal information
- Born: 6 March 1987 (age 39) Dolný Kubín, Czechoslovakia

Sport
- Sport: Skiing
- Club: Slovenská skialpinistická asociácia

Juraj Laštík (born 6 March 1987) is a Slovak ski mountaineer. He became a member of the SSA national squad in 2005.

Laštík was born in Dolny Kubin. He started ski mountaineering in 2003 and competed first in the Skialpfest in 2004.

== Selected results ==
- 2006:
  - 1st, Slovak Championship
- 2007:
  - 10th, European Championship relay race (together with Jozef Hlavco, Milan Madaj and Matúš Daňko)
- 2008:
  - 9th, World Championship relay race (together with Peter Svätojánsky, Miroslav Leitner and Jozef Hlavco)
