= Pavol Országh Hviezdoslav =

Slovak poet (1849–1921)

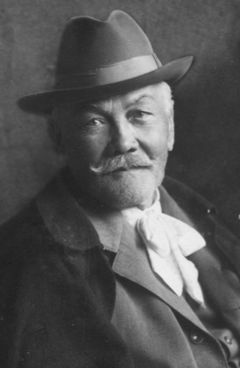
- Pavol Országh Hviezdoslav
- Born: Pavel Országh; 2 February 1849; Felsőkubin (now Vyšný Kubín, Slovakia)
- Died: 8 November 1921 (aged 72); Dolný Kubín, Czechoslovakia
- Resting place: Cemetery in Dolný Kubín
- Occupations: poet, dramatist, translator
- Spouse: Ilona Országhová
- Writing career
- Pen name: Pavol Országh Hviezdoslav, Jozef Zbranský
- Language: Slovak, Hungarian

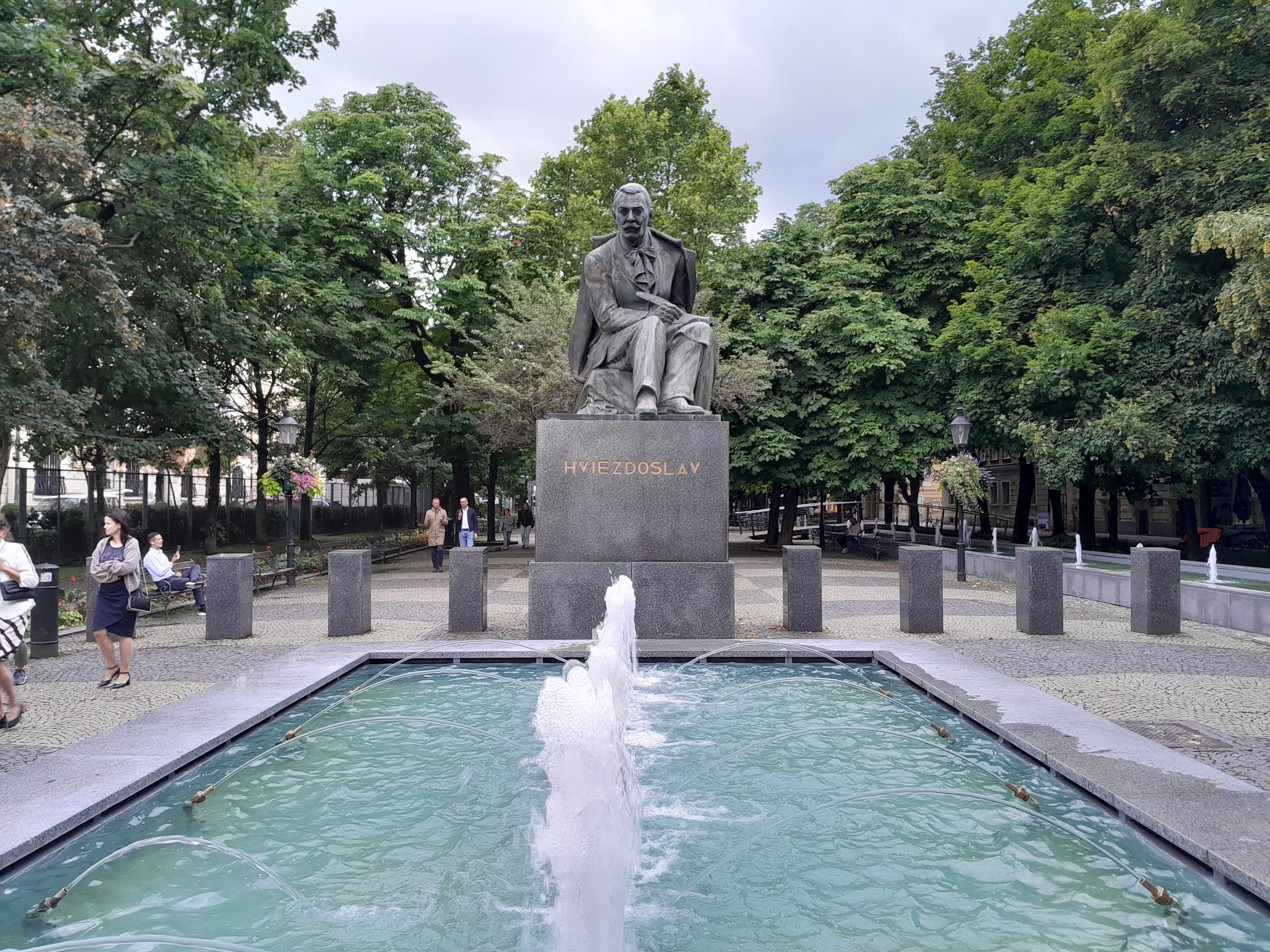
Hviezdoslav statue at Hviezdoslavovo námestie (Hviezdoslav Square) in Bratislava, Slovakia

Pavol Országh Hviezdoslav (2 February 1849 – 8 November 1921) was a Slovak poet, dramatist, translator, and for a short time, member of the Czechoslovak parliament from 1918 to 1920. Originally, he wrote in a traditional style, but later became influenced by parnassism and modernism.

== Name ==
He was born Pavol Országh. His surname is Hungarian (from ország 'country'). Hviezdoslav (a Slavic name, meaning approximately 'celebrating the stars' and/or 'Slav of the stars') was his pseudonym from 1875 onward. His earlier pseudonym was Jozef Zbranský.

== Life ==
Pavol Országh was living in Felsőkubin, Árva County, Kingdom of Hungary, Austrian Empire (now Vyšný Kubín, Slovakia). He was of noble origin. Hviezdoslav studied at grammar schools in Miskolc and Késmárk (now Kežmarok, Slovakia) in the Hungarian lutheran school. The young Országh became a Hungarian patriot. During this time he got acquainted with the poetry of Arany János and Petőfi Sándor and under their influence he started to write poems first in Hungarian, then from the mid-1870s in Slovak. After his graduation in 1870, he continued his studies at the Law Academy of Eperjes (now Prešov, Slovakia), where in 1871 he participated in the preparation of the Almanach Napred ("Forward" Miscellany/Almanac), which marked the beginning of a new literary generation in Slovak literature. Due to his contribution to this Almanac with several radical poems, however, he was ignored in the literary life of the country for the rest of the 1870s and couldn't get his works published. During this period, he pursued his law career in Alsókubin (now Dolný Kubín, Slovakia), but he also carried on with his literary work in his free time. He practiced as a lawyer between 1875 and 1899 in Námesztó (now Námestovo, Slovakia), and then in Alsókubin again. In 1918, he became a member of the newly created Revolutionary National Assembly (provisional governing body, later parliament) in Prague, and from 1919 to 1920, served as its representative. In 1919, he was chosen as the leader of the re-established Matica slovenská (Slovak matica), a Slovak cultural institute founded in 1863, and closed as a result of Hungarian policy in 1875.

In 1954, the Literary Museum of P. O. Hviezdoslav was established in Dolný Kubín. A festival of amateur poetry reciters named Hviezdoslav's Kubín has been held there since.

Minor planet 3980 is named Hviezdoslav.

== Works ==
Hviezdoslav introduced the syllabic-tonic verse into Slovak poetry and became the leading representative of Slovak literary realism. His style is characterized by extensive use of self-coined words and expressions, making it difficult to translate his works into foreign languages.

His oeuvre constitutes some 12 volumes of original poetry and an additional 3 volumes of translations of classical authors. During his era, he was the poet laureate of the Slovak nation. To honor his 1905 translation, of The Tragedy of Man by Imre Madách, he was elected a member of the Kisfaludy Society in 1912.

=== Collected works and selections ===
- The Collected Poetical Works of Hviezdoslav, vol. 1 to 15 (Zobrané spisy básnické Hviezdoslava, zv. 1–15, 1892 – 1931)
- Biblical Poems (Básne biblické, Prague 1911)
- The Writings of P.O. Hviezdoslav in 12 volumes (Spisy P.O. Hviezdoslava v 12 zväzkoch, 1951–1957)
- Poetic First Fruits (Basnicke prvotiny I-II, 1955–1956)
- Poetic Maturing I-II (Básnicke zrenie I-II, 1957–1958)
- Works I-IV (Dielo I-IV, 1973, second edition 1997–1998)

=== Reflexive poetry ===
He began writing poetry – initially in Hungarian – while still attending grammar school (in Miskolc and Kežmarok / Késmárk)). His first poetry collection, the Básnické prviesienky Jozefa Zbranského ("Poetry primroses of Jozef Zbranský"), was published in 1868. It introduced the syllabic-tonic verse into Slovak literature.

An awakened national pride brought him to resolve to work in Slovak, but the inclination towards realism in his early poetry was met with aversion by the older generation.

Among the most important of his mature lyric cycles are:

- Sonety (1882–1886) (Sonnets)
- Letorosty I-III (1885–1893) (Growth Rings I – III)
- Žalmy a hymny (1885–1892) (Psalms and Hymns)
- Prechádzky jarom (1898) (Walks through Spring)
- Prechádzky letom (1898) (Walks through Summer)
- Stesky (1903) (Languors/Complaints)
- Krvavé sonety (1914/1919) (Bloody Sonnets) – important anti-World War I poetry

=== Epic compositions ===
The poet's epic compositions derive from his native Orava and from biblical topics, through which he commented allegorically on the situation of the Slovak nation:

- Hájnikova žena (1884–1886) (The Gamekeeper's Wife)
- Ežo Vlkolinský (1890)
- Gábor Vlkolinský (1897–1899)

=== Biblical poetry ===
- Agar
- Kain
- Ráchel
- Sen Šalamúnov (The Dream of Solomon)

=== Drama ===
- Pomsta (Revenge)
- Herodes a Herodias (1909) (Herod and Herodias)- verse drama inspired by the Bible; a pillar of Slovak classic dramatic repertory.

== Translations ==
Hviezdoslav was also a translator. He translated many works of such authors as Goethe (Faust, Iphigenia on Tauris, ballads), Schiller (selected poems), Mickiewicz (Crimean Sonnets et al.), Pushkin (Boris Godunov, The Captive of the Caucasus, The Gypsies, Rusalka, etc.), Shakespeare (Hamlet, A Midsummer Night's Dream), Słowacki (In Switzerland, etc.), Arany (28 lyric poems and ballads), Petőfi (42 selected poems), Lermontov (A Song about the Emperor Ivan Vasilievitch, The Song of the Merchant Kalashnikov, The Demon) and Madách (The Tragedy of Man). These translations were collected after his death into volumes 12 to 15 of The Collected Poetical Works of Hviezdoslav.

== Legacy ==
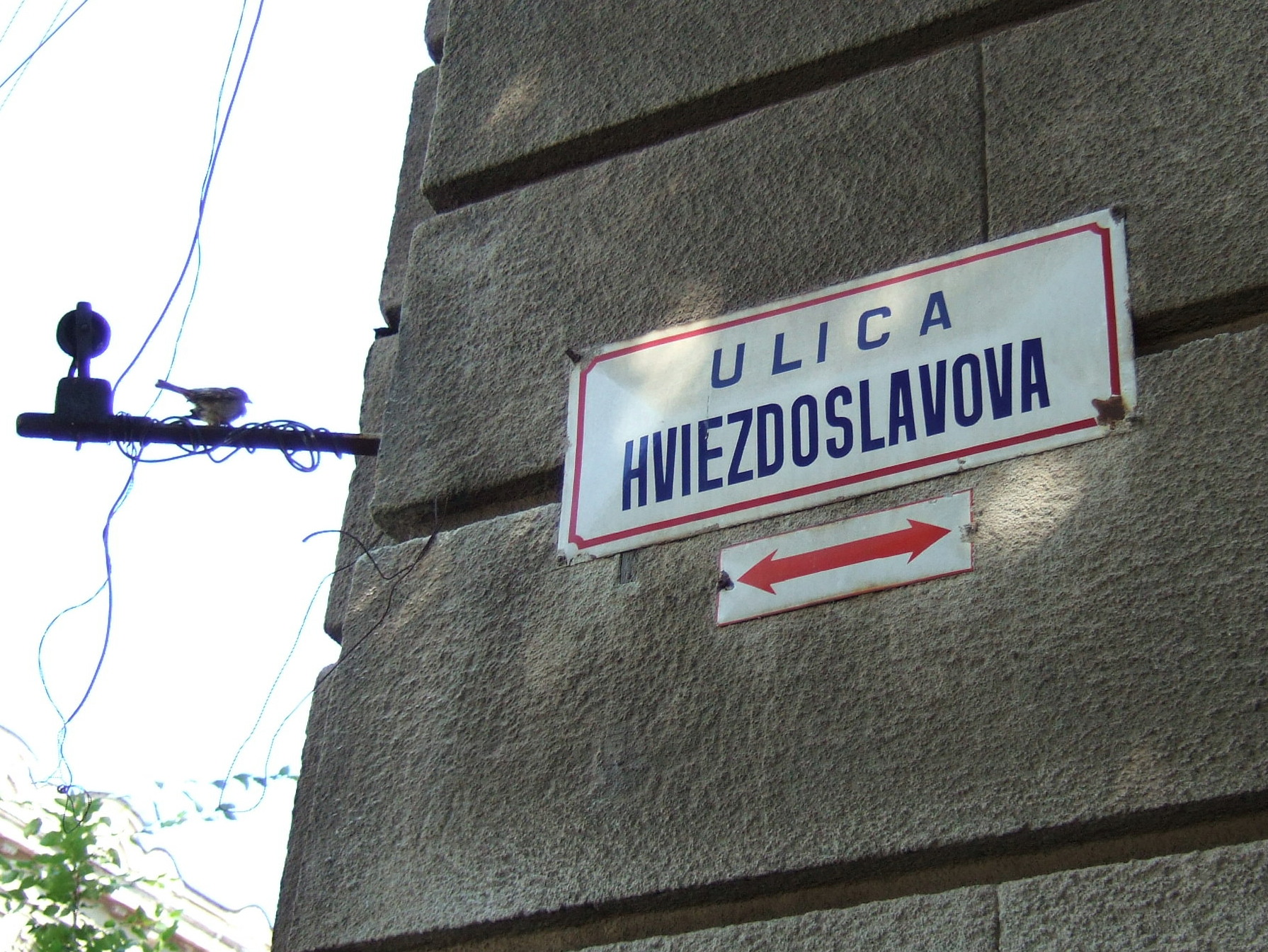
There are streets named after Hviezdoslav in almost all Slovak towns

Hviezdoslavovo námestie, a town square in Bratislava, along with the village of Hviezdoslavov and approximately 172 streets in Slovakia are named after him.

The poetry recitation contest Hviezdoslavov Kubín, which bears his name in honor, has been taking place every year since its inception in 1954, except for 1960.

== See also ==
- Slovak poetry
