= Ladislav Nádaši-Jégé =

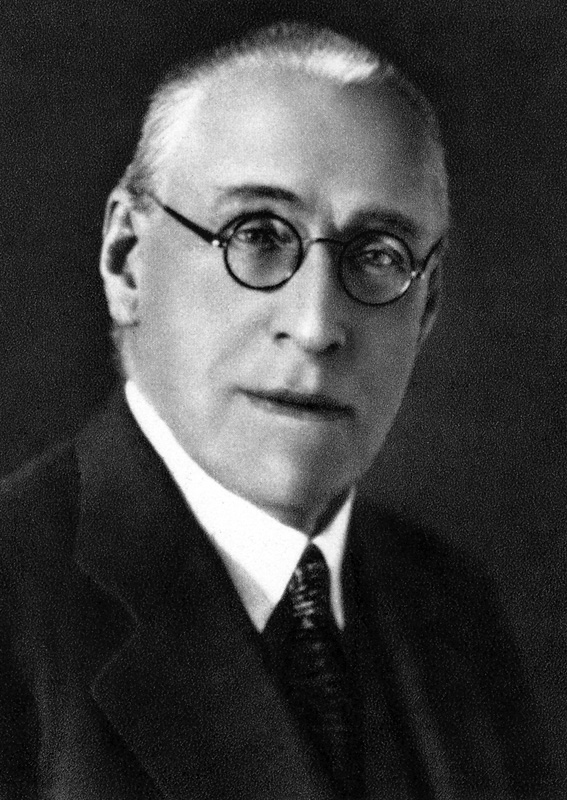
- Born: 12 February 1866; Dolný Kubín, Austrian Empire (now Slovakia)
- Died: 2 July 1940 (aged 74); Dolný Kubín, Slovakia
- Resting place: Dolný Kubín
- Other names: Ladislav Nádaši
- Occupation: poet

Dr Ján Ladislav Nádaši-Jégé (12 February 1866, in Dolný Kubín – 2 July 1940, in Dolný Kubín) was a Slovak writer, literary critic and doctor.

== Life ==
He was born into a lawyer's family in Dolný Kubín, and studied in Kežmarok, Ružomberok, Gyöngyös and Levoča. After leaving exams in Levoča he started to study medicine in Prague. He planned to leave for Cleveland in the United States, however, family problems changed his plans. He settled as a doctor in Dolný Kubín, where, with the exception of 1924–25, when he lived in Bratislava, lived his almost whole life. Jégé died in 1940 due to heart attack.

== Works ==
He started writing during his studies in Prague. At that time, he was a member of the Detvan association, which supported his literary activities. Under the pseudonym Ján Grob (from initials comes his pseudonym Jégé) he wrote several sketches and one novella. Most of his works, however, come from the 1930s and particularly 1920s, when he wrote his best works.

- 1897 - Pomsta ("Revenge"), tale
- 1889 - Výhody spoločenského života ("Advantages of the social life"), novella
- 1922 - Wieniawského legenda ("Wieniawski's legend"), historical novel
- 1923 - Adam Šangala, historical novel
- 1925 - Krpčeky sv. Floriána ("St. Florian's little boots"), drama
- 1925 - Mia, drama
- 1925 - Kuruci, ("Kuruc"), novella
- 1926 - Magister rytier Donč ("Knight Donč the Magister"), novella
- 1926 - Horymír, novella
- 1928 - Svätopluk, novel
- 1930 - Cesta životom ("A way through the life"), autobiographical work
- 1931 - Itália ("Italy"), collection of novellas
- 1931 - Kozinský mlyn ("Mill of Kozin"), novella
- 1932 - Alina Orságová, novel
- 1934 - Medzi nimi ("Between them"), collection of novellas
- 1937 - S duchom času ("With the spirit of time/Zeitgeist"), novel
