= Michal Kubačka =

Slovak footballer (born 1935)

Personal information
- Date of birth: 10 December 1935 (age 90)
- Place of birth: Dolný Kubín, Czechoslovakia
- Position: Goalkeeper

Senior career*
Years	Team	Apps	(Gls)
1953–1954	Spartak Dolný Kubín		
1954–1970	Slovan Nitra		
1970–1972	Spartak Vráble		
- * Club domestic league appearances and goals

Michal Kubačka (born 10 December 1935) is a Slovak former footballer who played as a goalkeeper.

In the Czechoslovak League, he played for Slovan Nitra. In lower competitions he also played for Spartak Dolný Kubín and Spartak Vráble.

== Club career ==
Kubačka started playing football in his hometown at the age of eighteen. He was the successor of Štefan Lešický in the goal of Nitra, being a part of the first promotion to the federal league in the 1958–59 season, finishing second behind Dukla Prague in the year 1961–62, and the unexpected relegation a season later.

He was a part of Slovan Nitra's success in the Mitropa Cup during the 1961–62 season. The Nitra team defeated FC Turin, SVS Linz and ČH Bratislava in the group stages, and going through against Udinese in the semi-finals. With Slovan Nitra, he made it to the final of the Mitropa Cup in 1961–62 against Bologna, whose team won its last title in the Italian league two years later. He played in the first final match, which was played on 14 March 1962 in Nitra and ended in a 2–2 draw. The rematch in Italy was played on 4 April 1962, the home team won it 3–0 and became the winner of the Mitropa Cup for the third time in its history.
