= List of cultural monuments in Lučenec =

This list contains the 59 buildings and structures officially designated as cultural monuments in Lučenec, Slovakia.

Photography	Name	Register number ÚSKP	Address/Coordinates	Notes
	Jewish Mortuary	606-458/0	Vajanský street	
	Memorial	606-516/0		Monument for Romanian soldiers killed in World War II.
	Ráday Family Crypt	606-2741/0	Lučenec cemetery	
	Mansion	606-3479/0	Zámocká street 54 = 48°20′2.26″N 19°40′59.2″E	
	Synagogue	606-3507/0	Ady street 4 = 48°19′28.02″N 19°40′9.3″E	The largest synagogue in the Slovak Republic
	Grave with a tombstone	606-519/0	Lučenec cemetery	Grave of Slovak writer Timrava (Božena Slančíková)
	Crypt	606-10455/0	Lučenec cemetery	Andrejcsik Family Crypt
	Mansion	606-10452/0	Filakovská street 12 - 48°19′32.45″N 19°40′14.84″E	Szilassy Mansion
	Town hall	606-3488/0	Dr. Herz street 1 - 48°19′38.96″N 19°40′5.59″E	Former town hall
	Burgher's house	606-3494/0	Dr. Herz street 12 = 48°19′38.71″N 19°40′1.24″E	
	Office building	606-3483/0	Dr. Herz street 14 = 48°19′38.68″N 19°39′59.69″E	Currently, the district court
	Rakottay villa	606-10958/0	Jókai street 7 = 48°19′52″N 19°40′11.32″E	
	Villa	606-11072/1	Jókai street 13 = 48°19′53.87″N 19°40′3.22″E	Currently, kindergarten
	Summer-house	606-11072/2	Jókai street 13 = 48°19′53.87″N 19°40′3.22″E	
	parcel wall	606-11072/3	Jókai street 13 = 48°19′53.87″N 19°40′3.22″E	
	Railing with columns	606-11072/4	Jókai street 13 = 48°19′53.87″N 19°40′3.22″E	
	Set of columns	606-11072/5	Jókai street 13 = 48°19′53.87″N 19°40′3.22″E	
	Bowl with stand	606-11072/6	Jókai street 13 = 48°19′53.87″N 19°40′3.22″E	
	Calvinist church	606-454/0	J. Kármán street 1 = 48°19′43.64″N 19°40′10.11″E	
	Bank	606-3489/0	J. Kármán street 2 = 48°19′43.86″N 19°40′9.08″E	Currently, Novohradská library
	Pedagogy school	606-3502/0	Komenský street 12 = 48°19′34.07″N 19°39′57.89″E	
	Evangelical church	606-453/0	Komenský street 14 = 48°19′32.78″N 19°39′58.02″E	
	Evangelical parsonage	606-3503/0	Komenský street 16 = 48°19′31.87″N 19°39′57.02″E	
	Roman Catholic Church	606-452/0	Kubínyi square = 48°19′41.56″N 19°39′10.39″E	
	Burgher's house	606-3484/0	Kubínyi square 1 = 48°19′39.07″N 19°40′10.49″E	
	The Roman Catholic parish	606-456/0	Kubínyi square 2 = 48°19′39.61″N 19°40′10.63″E	
	Burgher's house	606-457/0	Kubínyi square 3 = 48°19′40.12″N 19°40′10.81″E	
	Burgher's house	606-3485/0	Kubínyi square 4 = 48°19′40.62″N 19°40′10.96″E	
	Burgher's house	606-3490/0	Kubínyi square 5 = 48°19′41.16″N 19°40′11.14″E	
	Primary school	606-3491/0	Kubínyi square 6 = 48°19′41.66″N 19°40′11.28″E	Former girls School
	Burgher's house	606-3487/0	Kubínyiho náměstí 7 = 48°19′42.17″N 19°40′11.42″E	
	Burgher's house	606-3486/0	Kubínyi square 8 = 48°19′39.76″N 19°40′8.76″E	
	Banka	606-3492/0	Kubínyi square 9 = 48°19′41.05″N 19°40′9.08″E	Former Dunajská bank
	Burgher's house	606-3493/0	Kubínyi square 10 = 48°19′42.74″N 19°40′9.12″E	
	Burgher's house	606-3495/0	Masaryk street 2 = 48°19′43.1″N 19°40′8.51″E	
	Burgher's house	606-3496/0	Masaryk street 4 = 48°19′43.36″N 19°40′7.68″E	
	Burgher's house	606-3497/0	Masaryk street 6 = 48°19′43.57″N 19°40′6.82″E	
	Burgher's house	606-3498/0	Masaryk street 8 = 48°19′43.82″N 19°40′5.99″E	
	Burgher's house	606-3499/0	Masaryk street 10 = 48°19′44.04″N 19°40′5.12″E	
	Burgher's house	606-3500/0	Masaryk street 28 = 48°19′46.09″N 19°39′56.34″E	
	Burgher's house	606-3501/0	Masaryk street 29 = 48°19′47.42″N 19°39′49.82″E	
	Burgher's house	606-11073/0	Masaryk street 34 = 48°19′46.6″N 19°39′53.86″E	
	Former YMCA	606-10806/0	Novohrad street 2 = 48°19′48.79″N 19°39′46.8″E	
	Reduta - Lučenec	606-3482/0	Vajanský street 2 = 48°19′38.68″N 19°40′9.57″E	
	Memorial plaque	606-517/0	Vajanský street 5 = 48°19′36.88″N 19°40′7.5″E	Memorial plaque for Hungarian poet Sándor Petőfi
	Burgher's house	606-10451/0	Vajanský street 7 = 48°19′36.41″N 19°40′7.36″E	
	Burgher's house	606-3504/0	Vajanský street 14 = 48°19′35.26″N 19°40′7.82″E	
	Administrativní budova	606-3505/0	Vajanský street 16 = 48°19′34.72″N 19°40′7.68″E	
	Burgher's house	606-10765/0	Dr. Voda street 2 = 48°19′45.3″N 19°39′53.32″E	
	Memorial plaque	606-518/0	Zvolenská street 10 = 48°20′11.15″N 19°39′40.14″E	Memorial plaque for Slovak writer Timrava (Božena Slančíková)
	Cafe	606-3506/0	Železničná street 1 = 48°19′47.78″N 19°39′57.24″E	Currently, OTP Bank
	Burgher's house	606-11249/0	Železničná street 16 = 48°19′52.21″N 19°39′57.02″E	
	Mansion	606-470/1	Dolná Slatinka 4 = 48°20′58.99″N 19°41′22.88″E	
	Park	606-470/2	Dolná Slatinka 4 = 48°20′58.99″N 19°41′22.88″E	
	Mansion	606-469/1	Jegorov street 3 = 48°20′32.82″N 19°40′52″E	
	Park	606-469/2	Jegorov street 3 = 48°20′32.82″N 19°40′52″E	
	Ruins of mansion	606-471/1	Jegorov street 10 = 48°20′34.12″N 19°40′48.29″E	
	Remains of the park	606-471/2	Jegorov street 10 = 48°20′34.12″N 19°40′48.29″E	
	Memorial plaque	606-522/0	Gemerská street 32 = 48°20′21.66″N 19°40′44.98″E	Memorial plaque for Czech writer Alois Jirásek

== Sources ==
- English translation of the Slovak Wikipedia
