= St Catherine's Church, Dolný Kubín =

St Catherine's Church
- Kostol sv. Kataríny Alexandrijskej
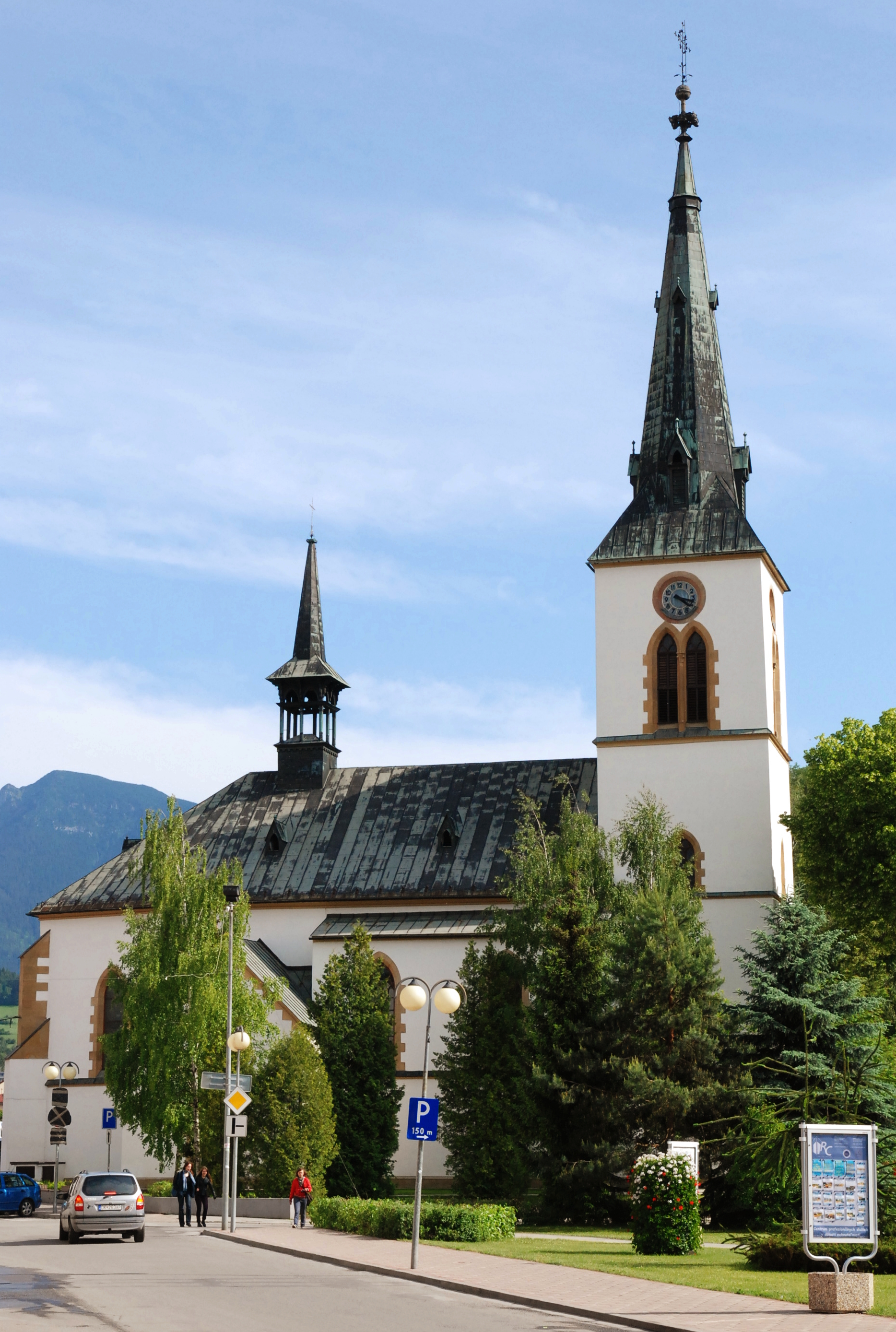
- St Catherine's Church

- Location in Slovakia
- 49°12′32.51″N 19°17′43.08″E
- Location: Dolný Kubín
- Country: Slovakia
- Denomination: Roman Catholic

History
- Status: Parish Church
- Dedication: Catherine of Alexandria

Architecture
- Heritage designation: Cultural Monument (The Monuments Board of the Slovak Republic, no. 503-216/0)
- Years built: 1380, reconstructions 1895, 2005

Administration
- Diocese: Roman Catholic Diocese of Spiš

Clergy
- Priest: Ľubomír Pekarčík

St Catherine's Church (Slovak: Kostol sv. Kataríny Alexandrijskej) Dolný Kubín, is a Roman Catholic church in Slovakia.

== History ==
The present Gothic church was built on the remnants of the first church of Dolný Kubín in the 14th century. The interior of the church was painted by "Slovenske umenie manifacture" in 1939. Paintings made by Edmund Maszanyi are from the same year.

The 1622 epitaph of Job Zmeskal and his wife from 1622 is placed here as well as a picture of Saint Catherine from 1764. In 1886, the church was renovated. A fire in 1895 almost destroyed the church but was quickly repaired with the help of a generous churchgoers and the dean. In 2005, several renovations were made to the church, including for the interior of the parish and its external staircases. Further addition of poles, ground lamps and cables was made in 2019 to illuminate the church through the provision by the city council with installation works and project documentation borne by the parish.
