= Janice, Rimavská Sobota District =

Village and municipality in Slovakia

Janice Jéne
- Municipality
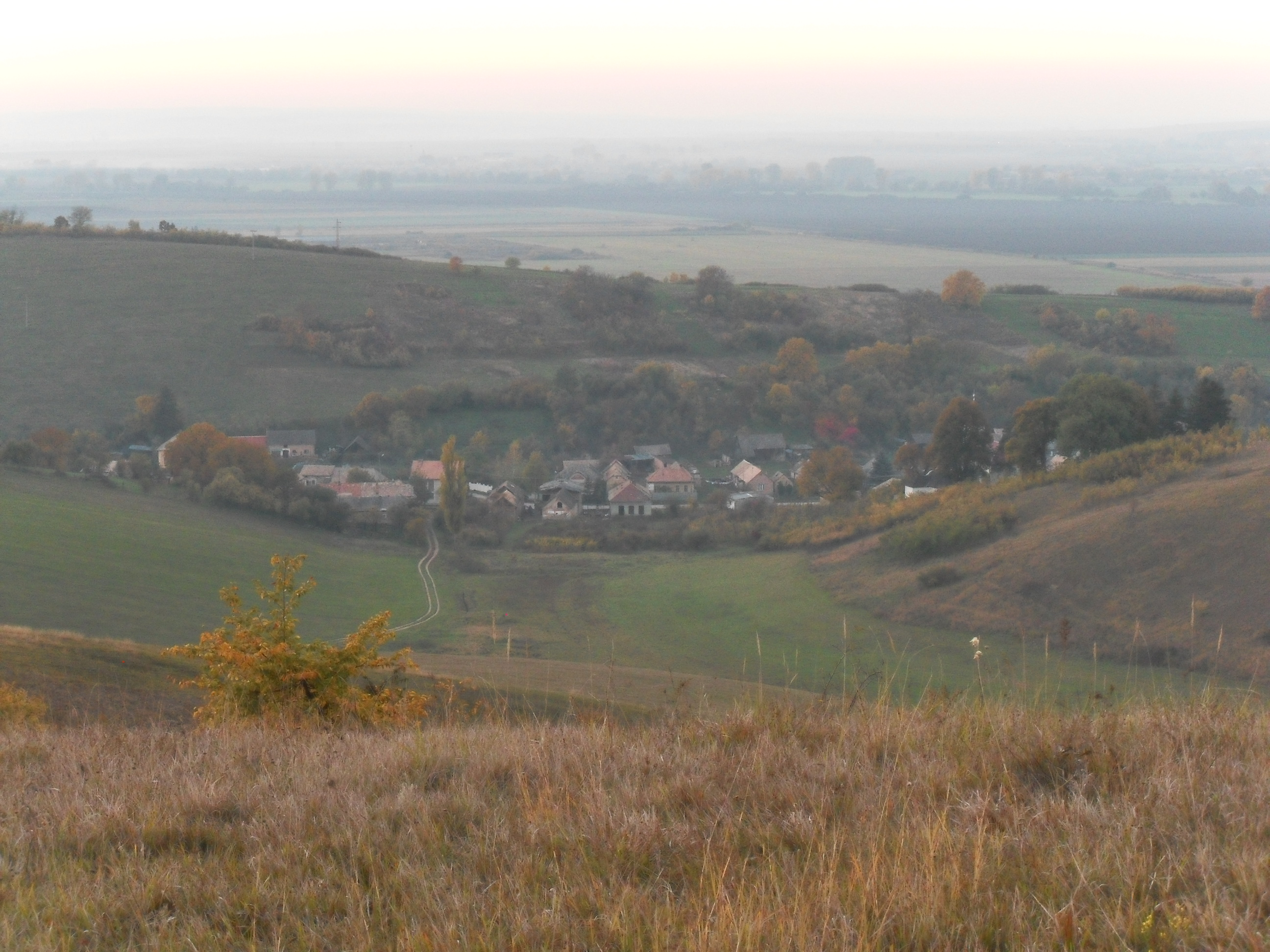

- Flag

- Location of Janice in the Banská Bystrica Region Location of Janice in Slovakia
- Coordinates: 48°17′N 20°13′E
- Country: Slovakia
- Region: Banská Bystrica Region
- District: Rimavská Sobota District
- First mentioned: 1216

Area
  - Total: 8.59 km^{2} (3.32 sq mi)
- Elevation: 171 m (561 ft)

Population (2025)
  - Total: 318
- Time zone: UTC+1 (CET)
  - Summer (DST): UTC+2 (CEST)
- Postal code: 980 42
- Area code: +421 47
- Vehicle registration plate (until 2022): RS
- Website: janice.sk

Janice (Hungarian: Jéne) is a village and municipality in the Rimavská Sobota District of the Banská Bystrica Region of southern Slovakia.

== History ==
On paper it is noticed in 1217 and in 1431 under the name Jeney. It consists of 2 parts - Čikovo (Czikóháza) and Janice. From the beginning it belonged to the yeoman's family of Jeney (local feudatories), then to the Fügeys and Széchys. The originally village burnt out in the 16th century and later it was established on present area. During travelling through Gemer, Matthias Corvinus came to a stop there supposedly, and according to that event, a part of the area „Čelo Mateja Korvína“ is named. It belonged to Hungary till Trianon

== Population ==
Population statistic (10 years)
Year	1995	2005	2015	2025
Count	158	192	254	318
Difference		+21.51%	+32.29%	+25.19%

Population statistic
Year	2024	2025
Count	329	318
Difference		−3.34%

It has a population of 318 people (31 December 2025).

=== Ethnicity ===
Census 2021 (1+ %)
Ethnicity	Number	Fraction
Hungarian	248	83.78%
Romani	220	74.32%
Not found out	18	6.08%
Slovak	11	3.71%
Total	296	

In year 2021 was 296 people by ethnicity 248 as Hungarian, 220 as Romani, 18 as Not found out and 11 as Slovak.

Note on population: The difference values of population numbers in the table "Population statistic" and in the sections "Ethnicity" & "Religion" is caused by the use of various statistical methods.

The vast majority of the municipality's population consists of the local Roma community. In 2019, they constituted an estimated 80% of the local population.

=== Religion ===
Census 2021 (1+ %)
Religion	Number	Fraction
Roman Catholic Church	183	61.82%
Calvinist Church	72	24.32%
None	18	6.08%
Not found out	14	4.73%
Jehovah's Witnesses	7	2.36%
Total	296	

In year 2021 was 296 people by religion 183 from Roman Catholic Church, 72 from Calvinist Church, 18 from None, 14 from Not found out, 7 from Jehovah's Witnesses and 2 from Evangelical Church.

== Genealogical resources ==
The records for genealogical research are available at the state archive "Statny Archiv in Banska Bystrica, Slovakia"

- Reformated church records (births/marriages/deaths): 1714-1897 (parish B)

== See also ==
- List of municipalities and towns in Slovakia
