= Kubin, Azerbaijan =

Coordinates: 38°54′N 48°39′E

Kubin
- Village and Municipality
- Interactive map of Kubin
- Country: Azerbaijan
- Rayon: Masally

Population
  - Total: 509
- Time zone: UTC+4 (AZT)
  - Summer (DST): UTC+5 (AZT)

Kubin is a village and municipality in the Masally Rayon of Azerbaijan. It has a population of 509.
