= Polichno =

Polichno Parlagos
- Municipality
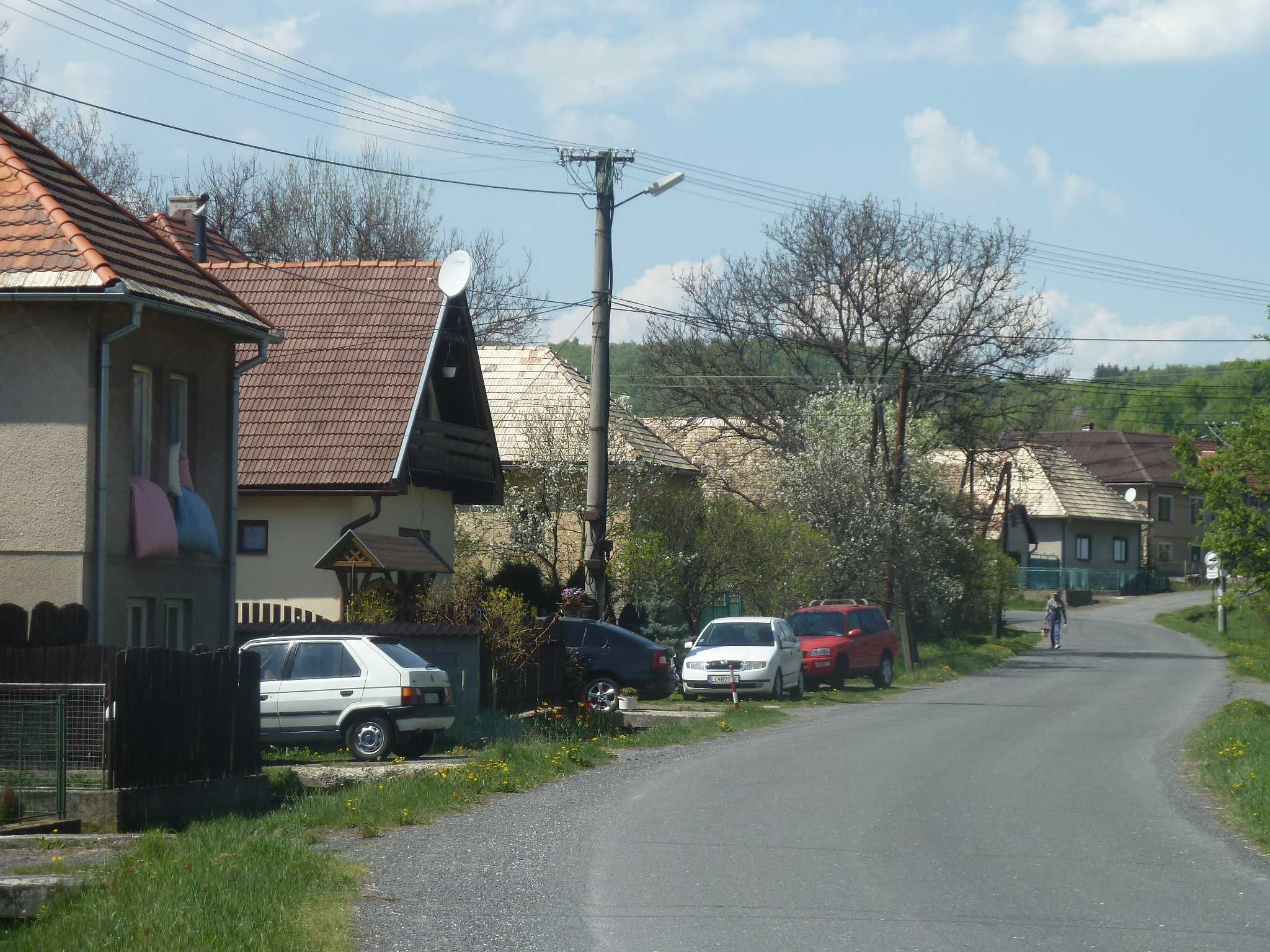

- Flag

- Location of Polichno in the Banská Bystrica Region Location of Polichno in Slovakia
- Coordinates: 48.42°N 19.50°E
- Country: Slovakia
- Region: Banská Bystrica Region
- District: Lučenec District
- First mentioned: 1467

Area
  - Total: 11.07 km^{2} (4.27 sq mi)
- Elevation: 596 m (1,955 ft)

Population (2025)
  - Total: 120
- Time zone: UTC+1 (CET)
  - Summer (DST): UTC+2 (CEST)
- Postal code: 985 13
- Area code: +421 47
- Vehicle registration plate (until 2022): LC
- Website: www.polichno.sk/wp/

Polichno (Hungarian: Parlagos) is a village and municipality in the Lučenec District in the Banská Bystrica Region of Slovakia.

== Geography ==
The municipality lies at an altitude of 596 metres (1,955 ft) and covers an area of 11.07 km^{2} (4.27 sq mi) (2025).

== Population ==
Population statistic (10 years)
Year	1995	2005	2015	2025
Count	130	145	144	120
Difference		+11.53%	−0.68%	−16.66%

Population statistic
Year	2024	2025
Count	124	120
Difference		−3.22%

It has a population of 120 people (31 December 2025).

=== Ethnicity ===
Census 2021 (1+ %)
Ethnicity	Number	Fraction
Slovak	75	58.59%
Not found out	51	39.84%
Romani	2	1.56%
Total	128	

In year 2021 was 128 people by ethnicity 75 as Slovak, 51 as Not found out, 2 as Romani, 1 as Czech and 1 as Rusyn.

Note on population: The difference values of population numbers in the table "Population statistic" and in the sections "Ethnicity" & "Religion" is caused by the use of various statistical methods.

=== Religion ===
Census 2021 (1+ %)
Religion	Number	Fraction
Not found out	52	40.63%
None	30	23.44%
Roman Catholic Church	18	14.06%
Evangelical Church	17	13.28%
Seventh-day Adventist Church	9	7.03%
Total	128	

In year 2021 was 128 people by religion 52 from Not found out, 30 from None, 18 from Roman Catholic Church, 17 from Evangelical Church, 9 from Seventh-day Adventist Church, 1 from Calvinist Church and 1 from United Methodist Church.
