= Dolný Kubín =

- Municipality
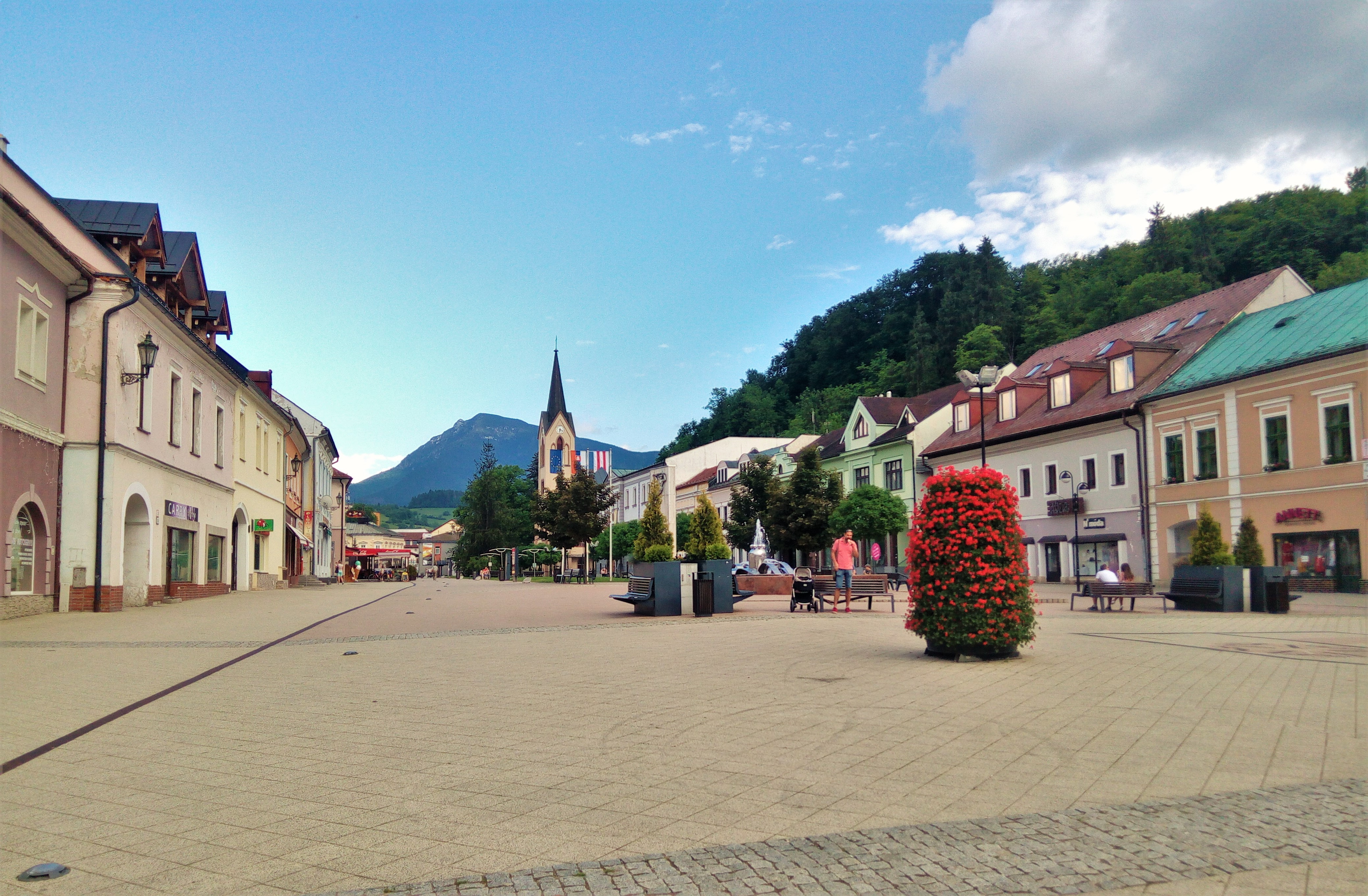
- Main square in the historical city centre

- Flag Coat of arms

- Location of Dolný Kubín in the Žilina Region Location of Dolný Kubín in Slovakia
- Coordinates: 49.21°N 19.30°E
- Country: Slovakia
- Region: Žilina Region
- District: Dolný Kubín District
- First mentioned: 1325

Government
  - Mayor: Ján Prílepok (independent)

Area
  - Total: 55.05 km^{2} (21.25 sq mi)
- Elevation: 507 m (1,663 ft)

Population (2025)
  - Total: 17,378
- Time zone: UTC+1 (CET)
  - Summer (DST): UTC+2 (CEST)
- Postal code: 260 1
- Area code: +421 43
- Vehicle registration plate (until 2022): DK
- Website: www.dolnykubin.sk

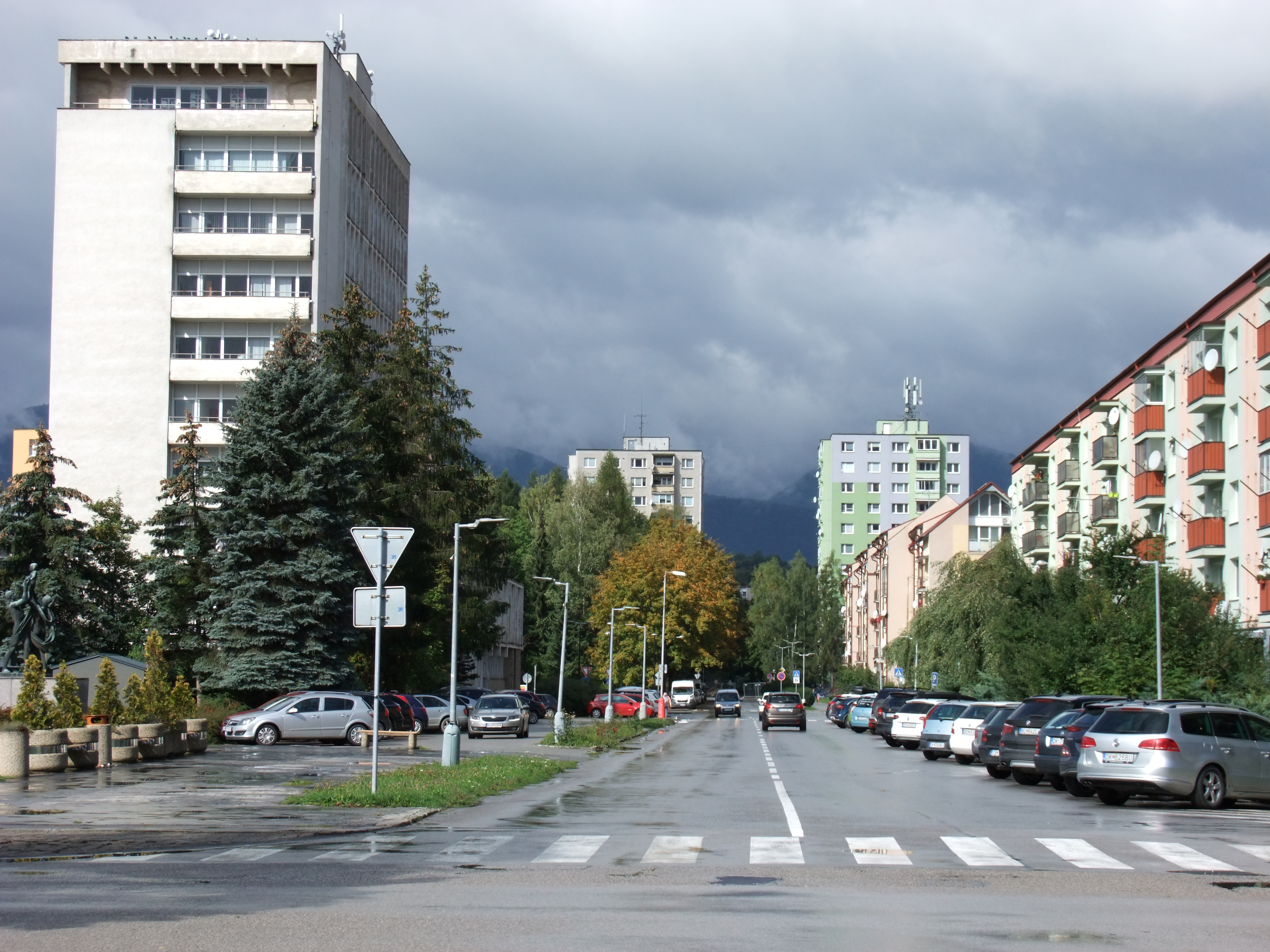
Bysterec, a district of Dolný Kubín. The photo shows SNP (Slovak National Uprising) Street. The town's Freedom Square is located out of frame to the left.

Dolný Kubín (Slovak pronunciation: [ˈdɔlniː ˈkubiːn]; also known by other names) is a town in northern Slovakia in the Žilina Region. It is the historical capital and the largest settlement of the Orava region.

== Names ==
The name is derived from the archaic Slovak word klubin meaning a "glade covered by smoke after burnt roots". Dolný Kubín means "Lower Kubín", in contrast with to Vyšný ("Upper") Kubín. The location and the settlement was known also as Kublen (1314), Clbin (1393), Culbyn (1408), Kubyn Nysny (1547), and Dolny Kubin (1773). Other names in the past include German: Unterkubin, Hungarian: Alsókubin.

== Geography ==
The municipality lies at an altitude of 507 metres (1,663 ft) and covers an area of 55.05 km^{2} (21.25 sq mi) (2025).

It is located in northern Slovakia on the Orava River, between the Lesser Fatra, Oravská Magura and Chočské vrchy mountains. It is located around 15 km (9.32 mi) from Ružomberok, 45 km (27.96 mi) from the Polish border and 270 km (167.77 mi) from Bratislava. The town is composed of the following boroughs: Banisko, Beňova Lehota, Brezovec, Kňažia, Malý Bysterec, Medzihradné, Mokraď, Srňacie, Staré mesto, Veľký Bysterec and Záskalie. The city limits also encompass the settlement of Jelšava.

=== Climate ===
The Köppen Climate Classification subtype for this climate is "Dfb" (Warm Summer Continental Climate).

== History ==
The first written reference of the location dates from 1314 and is about the land (not the settlement yet) Kubín. In 1325, the existence of "Superior Kolbyn" (Vyšný Kubín) was recorded what could indicate also the existence of Dolný Kubín, more detailed information about the settlement are from 1380s. The settlement belonged to the Orava Castle and was the center for the neighboring settlements. The citizens lived by animal husbandry and hunting, but also by quarrying. It was granted town privileges (town status, town charter) in 1632, and its importance was further strengthened in 1633 when the town was granted the right to hold markets. In 1683 the town became the seat of the Orava county and in 1776 also the seat of a processus district. In the 19th century Dolný Kubín was a centre of Slovak national life and the poet Pavol Országh Hviezdoslav and other Slovak national revivalists were active in the town.

After World War I, Dolný Kubín remained the seat of the Orava County until 1923, when Orava became a part of Váh County and it became the seat of its district. During World War II, the local garrison actively participated in preparation of Slovak National Uprising. Between December 1944 and January 1945, the town suffered from retaliatory actions and mass arrests. Red Army arrived to the town in the night from 4 to 5 April 1945, warmly welcomed by the local population.

The town experienced major developments mainly after World War II, when electrical works as well as other enterprises were established.

== Landmarks and culture ==
The Gothic St. Catherine church was built in the 14th century. The Čaplovič Library, containing collection of newspapers, books, maps and other printed works from 15th to the 19th century, along with the P. O. Hviezdoslav Museum, is located in the town. The Orava Gallery focuses on the art works from the 15th century to the 20th century and is seated in the former County House from the 17th century. The premier Slovak competition in poetry and prose recitation, called Hviezdoslavov Kubín (Hviezdoslav's Kubín), has taken place in the town since 1954. Orava Castle is located a few kilometres north-east of the town, in the village of Oravský Podzámok.

== Population ==
Population statistic (10 years)
Year	1995	2005	2015	2025
Count	19,562	19,882	19,196	17,378
Difference		+1.63%	−3.45%	−9.47%

Population statistic
Year	2024	2025
Count	17,540	17,378
Difference		−0.92%

It has a population of 17,378 people (31 December 2025).

=== Ethnicity ===
Census 2021 (1+%)
Ethnicity	Number	Fraction
Slovak	17,181	94.94%
Not found out	755	4.17%
Czech	191	1.05%
Total	18,095	

In year 2021 was 18,095 people by ethnicity 17,181 as Slovak, 755 as Not found out, 191 as Czech, 78 as Other, 71 as Romani, 35 as Polish, 29 as Ukrainian, 27 as Hungarian, 21 as Russian, 16 as Rusyn, 12 as German, 10 as English, 8 as Chinese, 8 as French, 7 as Italian, 5 as Vietnamese, 5 as Canadian, 5 as Croatian, 4 as Jewish, 4 as Irish, 4 as Moravian, 3 as Serbian, 2 as Turkish, 2 as Austrian, 2 as Greek, 2 as Albanian, 1 as Silesian, 1 as Romanian, 1 as Iranian and 1 as Bulgarian.

Note on population: The difference values of population numbers in the table "Population statistic" and in the sections "Ethnicity" & "Religion" is caused by the use of various statistical methods.

=== Religion ===
Census 2021 (1+%)
Religion	Number	Fraction
Roman Catholic Church	10,336	57.12%
None	3947	21.81%
Evangelical Church	2357	13.03%
Not found out	994	5.49%
Total	18,095	

In year 2021 was 18,095 people by religion 10,336 from Roman Catholic Church, 3947 from None, 2357 from Evangelical Church, 994 from Not found out, 131 from Greek Catholic Church, 67 from Ad hoc movements, 44 from Other, 30 from Christian Congregations in Slovakia, 29 from Buddhism, 28 from Eastern Orthodox Church, 27 from Other and not ascertained christian church, 20 from Jehovah's Witnesses, 16 from Islam, 15 from United Methodist Church, 12 from Calvinist Church, 12 from Paganism and natural spirituality, 6 from Church of the Brethren, 6 from Seventh-day Adventist Church, 5 from Czechoslovak Hussite Church, 4 from Baptists Church, 3 from Old Catholic Church, 3 from Hinduism, 2 from Apostolic Church and 1 from Jewish community.

According to the 2001 census, the town had 19,948 inhabitants. 97.03% of inhabitants were Slovaks, 1.07% Czechs and 0.28% Roma. The religious make-up was 65.11% Roman Catholics, 16.62% Lutherans and 14.55% people with no religious affiliation.

== Twin towns — sister cities ==
Dolný Kubín is twinned with:

- Braunau am Inn, Austria
- Eger, Hungary
- Kamianets-Podilskyi, Ukraine
- Limanowa, Poland
- Pakrac, Croatia
- Pelhřimov, Czech Republic
- Svendborg, Denmark
- Truskavets, Ukraine
- Zawiercie, Poland

== Notable people ==
- Pavol Országh Hviezdoslav (1849–1921), poet; lived and died in Dolný Kubín
- Ladislav Nádaši-Jégé (1866–1940), author
- Janko Matúška (1821–1877), poet and activist, author of Slovakia's national anthem
- Michal Kubačka (born 1935), footballer
- Juraj Laštík (born 1987), ski mountaineer
- Soňa Stanovská (born 2000), slalom canoeist

== See also ==
- List of municipalities and towns in Slovakia

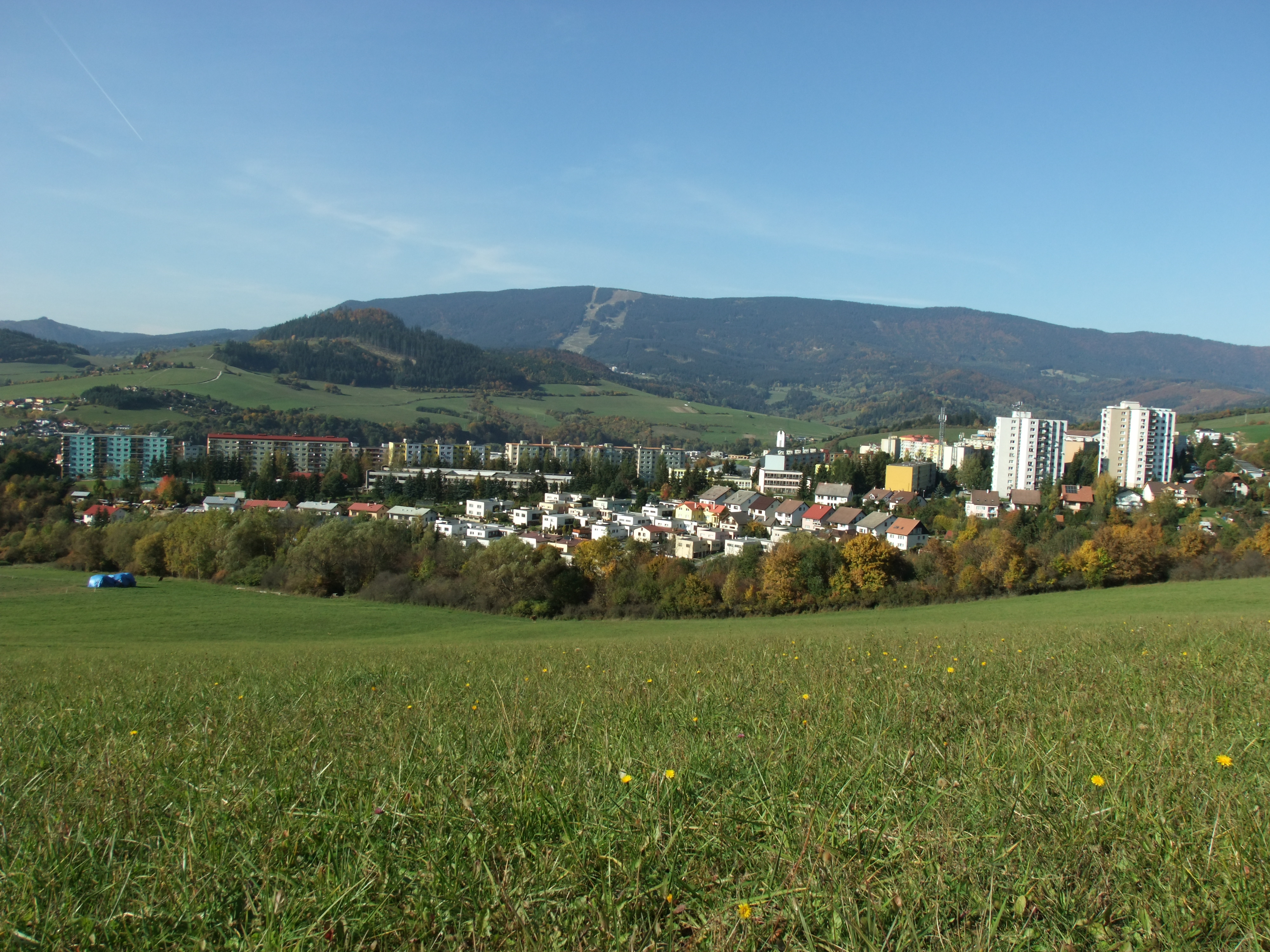
The photo shows the Brezovec district of Dolný Kubín. In the background is the Kubínska hoľa hill.

== Genealogical resources ==
The records for genealogical research are available at the state archive "Statny Archiv in Bytca, Slovakia"

- Roman Catholic church records (births/marriages/deaths): 1672-1898 (parish A)
- Lutheran church records (births/marriages/deaths): 1787-1897 (parish A)
