= Lučenec =

Lučenec Losonc
- Municipality
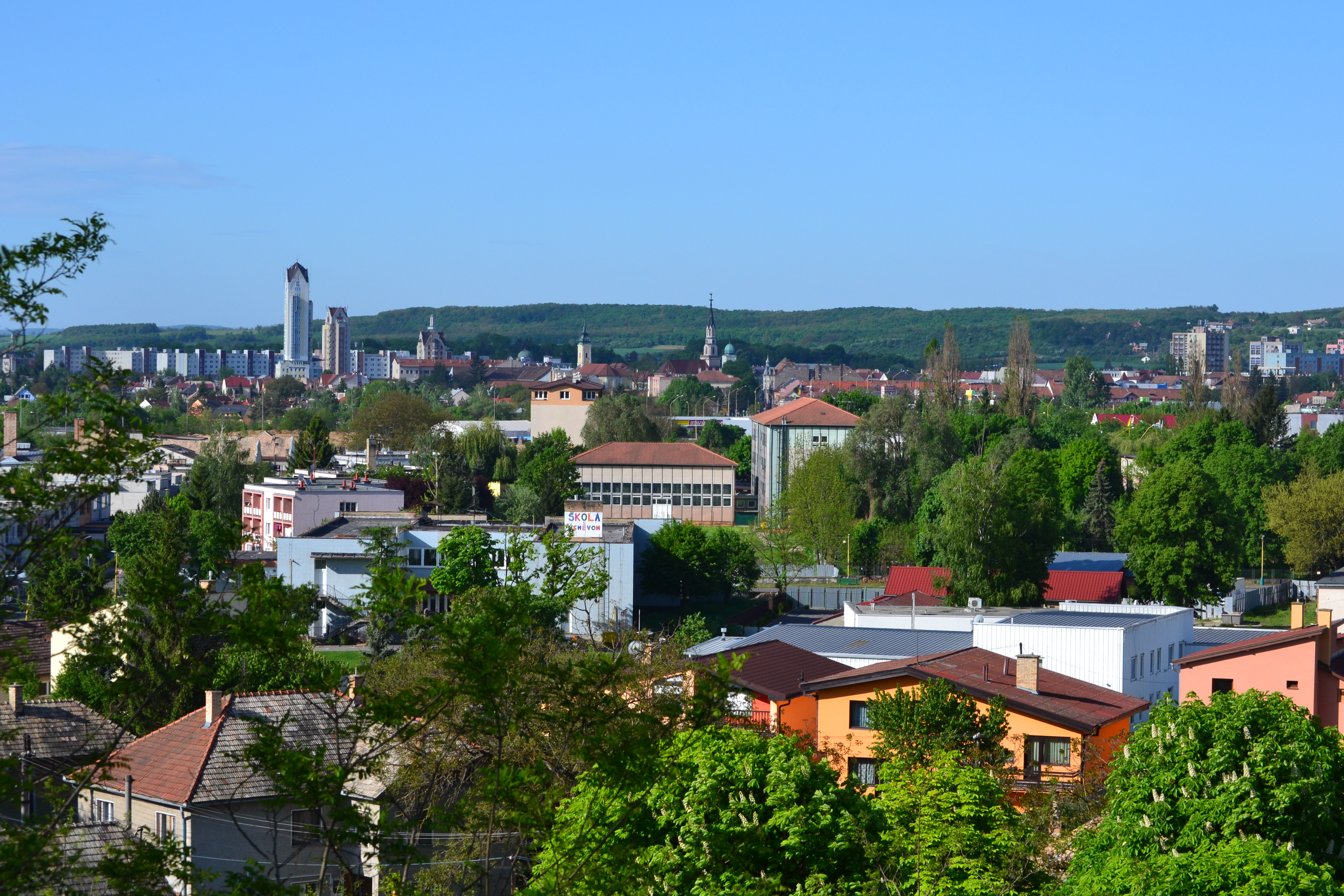
- Panorama of Lučenec

- Flag Coat of arms

- Location of Lučenec in the Banská Bystrica Region Location of Lučenec in Slovakia
- Coordinates: 48.33°N 19.67°E
- Country: Slovakia
- Region: Banská Bystrica Region
- District: Lučenec District
- First mentioned: 1262

Government
  - Mayor: Alexandra Pivková

Area
  - Total: 47.80 km^{2} (18.46 sq mi)
- Elevation: 186 m (610 ft)

Population (2025)
  - Total: 24,427
- Time zone: UTC+1 (CET)
  - Summer (DST): UTC+2 (CEST)
- Postal code: 984 01
- Area code: +421 47
- Vehicle registration plate (until 2022): LC
- Website: www.lucenec.sk

Lučenec (Slovak pronunciation: [ˈlutʂeɲets]; German: Lizenz; Hungarian: Losonc; Yiddish: לאשאנץ, romanized: Lashantz; Latin: Lutetia Hungarorum) is a town in the Banská Bystrica Region of south-central Slovakia. Historically, it was part, and in the 18th century the capital, of Nógrád County of the Kingdom of Hungary. In 1920, as a result of the Treaty of Trianon, it became a part of Czechoslovakia. The town has a large synagogue, built in 1924, which served a large Jewish population before World War II. The synagogue underwent renovations in 2016.

Lučenec is the economic centre of the whole Novohrad region, which includes districts Poltár and Veľký Krtíš.

== Geography ==
The municipality lies at an altitude of 186 metres (610 ft) and covers an area of 47.80 km^{2} (18.46 sq mi) (2025).

== History ==
Lučenec and its surroundings were inhabited in the Stone Ages. Slavs moved to this area in the 6th and 7th century as the first permanent settlers and the Hungarians joined them in the 10th century.

The first indirect mention of Lučenec was in 1128, when Lambert built a chapel in honour of Virgin Mary. The first direct mention of the settlement was in 1247 under the name Luchunch, but until the first half of the 15th century it was only a village, and was located off the main trade routes. In 1442, Lučenec was conquered by the Hussites troops under command of John Jiskra of Brandýs and in 1451 the Battle of Lučenec took place near the village between the troops of John Hunyadi and those of Jiskra, where the latter emerged victorious.

After the fall of the Fiľakovo (Hungarian: Fülek, German: Fülleck) castle in 1554, Lučenec was under the control of the Ottomans and their vassals as part of Budin Eyalet until capturing by Austrians in 1593. It was regained by Ottomans in 1596 and was again part of Filek (Ottoman name for Fiľakovo) sanjak (its centre was in modern-day Rimavská Sobota) in Eğri Eyalet till 1686. The town was burned down many times until the first half of the 19th century, when during the Revolutions of 1848/1849 it was occupied by the Russian imperial troops.

The town underwent modernization in the 19th and 20th centuries, for example, new industries like brickworks or tanneries were built, telegraph line in 1865, and in 1871 it was connected to the railway connecting Budapest (Slovak: Budapešť) and Žilina. Before the establishment of independent Czechoslovakia in 1918, Lučenec was part of Nógrád County within the Kingdom of Hungary. In 1919, it was briefly part of the Slovak Soviet Republic. In 1938, Lučenec was annexed to Hungary as a result of the First Vienna Award, and this lasted until 1945 when it was returned to Czechoslovakia. Approximately 8.3% of current residents are ethnic Hungarians.

The Novohrad Museum and Gallery with a collection of over 30,000 artefacts moved to a building in Kubínyiho Square in 1985.

== Climate ==
Lučenec has a Humid continental climate (Köppen: Dfb) with four alternating seasons. There are warm summers and cold winters. There is a high number of sunshine days with a short time of duration of snow cover as well as the cover is relatively low. Near by Lučenec are located several water reservoirs such as Ľadovo, Mýtna, Málinec and most popular Ružiná.

Climate data for Lučenec (1991−2020 normals, extremes 1986−present)
Month	Jan	Feb	Mar	Apr	May	Jun	Jul	Aug	Sep	Oct	Nov	Dec	Year
Record high °C (°F)	15.4 (59.7)	19.1 (66.4)	24.3 (75.7)	30.5 (86.9)	32.1 (89.8)	36.0 (96.8)	39.0 (102.2)	37.3 (99.1)	34.5 (94.1)	27.5 (81.5)	21.6 (70.9)	14.2 (57.6)	39.0 (102.2)
Mean maximum °C (°F)	9.0 (48.2)	12.4 (54.3)	19.0 (66.2)	25.2 (77.4)	28.6 (83.5)	32.0 (89.6)	33.8 (92.8)	33.3 (91.9)	28.6 (83.5)	23.2 (73.8)	15.8 (60.4)	9.4 (48.9)	34.7 (94.5)
Mean daily maximum °C (°F)	1.4 (34.5)	4.8 (40.6)	10.6 (51.1)	17.3 (63.1)	22.0 (71.6)	25.5 (77.9)	27.6 (81.7)	27.5 (81.5)	21.8 (71.2)	15.3 (59.5)	8.2 (46.8)	1.8 (35.2)	15.3 (59.5)
Daily mean °C (°F)	−1.7 (28.9)	0.5 (32.9)	5.2 (41.4)	10.8 (51.4)	15.4 (59.7)	19.0 (66.2)	20.8 (69.4)	20.6 (69.1)	15.7 (60.3)	10.2 (50.4)	4.8 (40.6)	−0.8 (30.6)	10.0 (50.0)
Mean daily minimum °C (°F)	−4.7 (23.5)	−3.7 (25.3)	−0.2 (31.6)	4.3 (39.7)	8.9 (48.0)	12.5 (54.5)	14.1 (57.4)	13.8 (56.8)	9.6 (49.3)	5.3 (41.5)	1.5 (34.7)	−3.3 (26.1)	4.8 (40.6)
Mean minimum °C (°F)	−15.8 (3.6)	−12.5 (9.5)	−7.5 (18.5)	−2.9 (26.8)	2.2 (36.0)	6.6 (43.9)	8.3 (46.9)	7.5 (45.5)	2.8 (37.0)	−3.5 (25.7)	−6.6 (20.1)	−13.4 (7.9)	−17.8 (0.0)
Record low °C (°F)	−25.7 (−14.3)	−24.0 (−11.2)	−16.2 (2.8)	−10.5 (13.1)	−2.5 (27.5)	2.9 (37.2)	4.0 (39.2)	3.0 (37.4)	−1.2 (29.8)	−9.8 (14.4)	−15.0 (5.0)	−26.1 (−15.0)	−26.1 (−15.0)
Average precipitation mm (inches)	26.4 (1.04)	28.4 (1.12)	27.9 (1.10)	38.4 (1.51)	69.6 (2.74)	72.8 (2.87)	90.1 (3.55)	65.3 (2.57)	48.7 (1.92)	52.2 (2.06)	46.8 (1.84)	35.3 (1.39)	601.9 (23.70)
Average precipitation days (≥ 1 mm)	5.7	6.0	6.2	6.3	9.3	8.6	8.9	7.2	6.8	7.1	8.0	6.9	87.0
Source: infoclimat.fr

== Population ==
Historical population
Year	Pop.	±%
1970	20,378	—
1980	24,436	+19.9%
1991	28,580	+17.0%
2001	28,332	−0.9%
2011	28,475	+0.5%
2021	25,902	−9.0%
Source: Censuses

Population statistic (10 years)
Year	1995	2005	2015	2025
Count	29,029	27,977	28,099	24,427
Difference		−3.62%	+0.43%	−13.06%

Population statistic
Year	2024	2025
Count	24,661	24,427
Difference		−0.94%

It has a population of 24,427 people (31 December 2025).

=== Ethnicity ===
Census 2021 (1+ %)
Ethnicity	Number	Fraction
Slovak	20,901	80.69%
Not found out	2906	11.21%
Hungarian	2535	9.78%
Total	25,902	

In year 2021 was 25,902 people by ethnicity 20,901 as Slovak, 2906 as Not found out, 2535 as Hungarian, 158 as Romani, 136 as Czech, 72 as Other, 23 as Russian, 21 as German, 18 as Rusyn, 16 as Ukrainian, 16 as Turkish, 15 as Polish, 14 as English, 13 as Chinese, 13 as Albanian, 10 as Bulgarian, 8 as Vietnamese, 7 as Italian, 6 as Jewish, 5 as French, 4 as Irish, 4 as Austrian, 4 as Moravian, 3 as Serbian, 3 as Greek, 3 as Croatian, 1 as Silesian, 1 as Romanian and 1 as Canadian.

Note on population: The difference values of population numbers in the table "Population statistic" and in the sections "Ethnicity" & "Religion" is caused by the use of various statistical methods.

In 1910 out of 12,939 inhabitants some 10,634 were Hungarians (82%), 1,675 Slovaks (13%), 428 Germans, 9 Romas, 1 Ruthenian, 12 Croatians, 18 Serbians and 162 others.

=== Religion ===
Census 2021 (1+ %)
Religion	Number	Fraction
Roman Catholic Church	10,617	40.99%
None	8509	32.85%
Not found out	3021	11.66%
Evangelical Church	2647	10.22%
Total	25,902	

In year 2021 was 25,902 people by religion 10,617 from Roman Catholic Church, 8509 from None, 3021 from Not found out, 2647 from Evangelical Church, 182 from Greek Catholic Church, 144 from Baptists Church, 120 from Calvinist Church, 120 from Christian Congregations in Slovakia, 115 from Jehovah's Witnesses, 76 from Other, 64 from Ad hoc movements, 53 from Islam, 45 from Other and not ascertained christian church, 34 from Seventh-day Adventist Church, 31 from Eastern Orthodox Church, 31 from Buddhism, 21 from Paganism and natural spirituality, 21 from United Methodist Church, 20 from Apostolic Church, 10 from Jewish community, 9 from Old Catholic Church, 5 from Hinduism, 3 from Bahá'i Community, 2 from Church of the Brethren and 2 from Church of Jesus Christ of Latter-day Saints.

== Boroughs ==
Lučenec is divided into these boroughs:

- Lučenec
- Opatová
- Malá Ves
- Rúbanisko

== Notable people ==
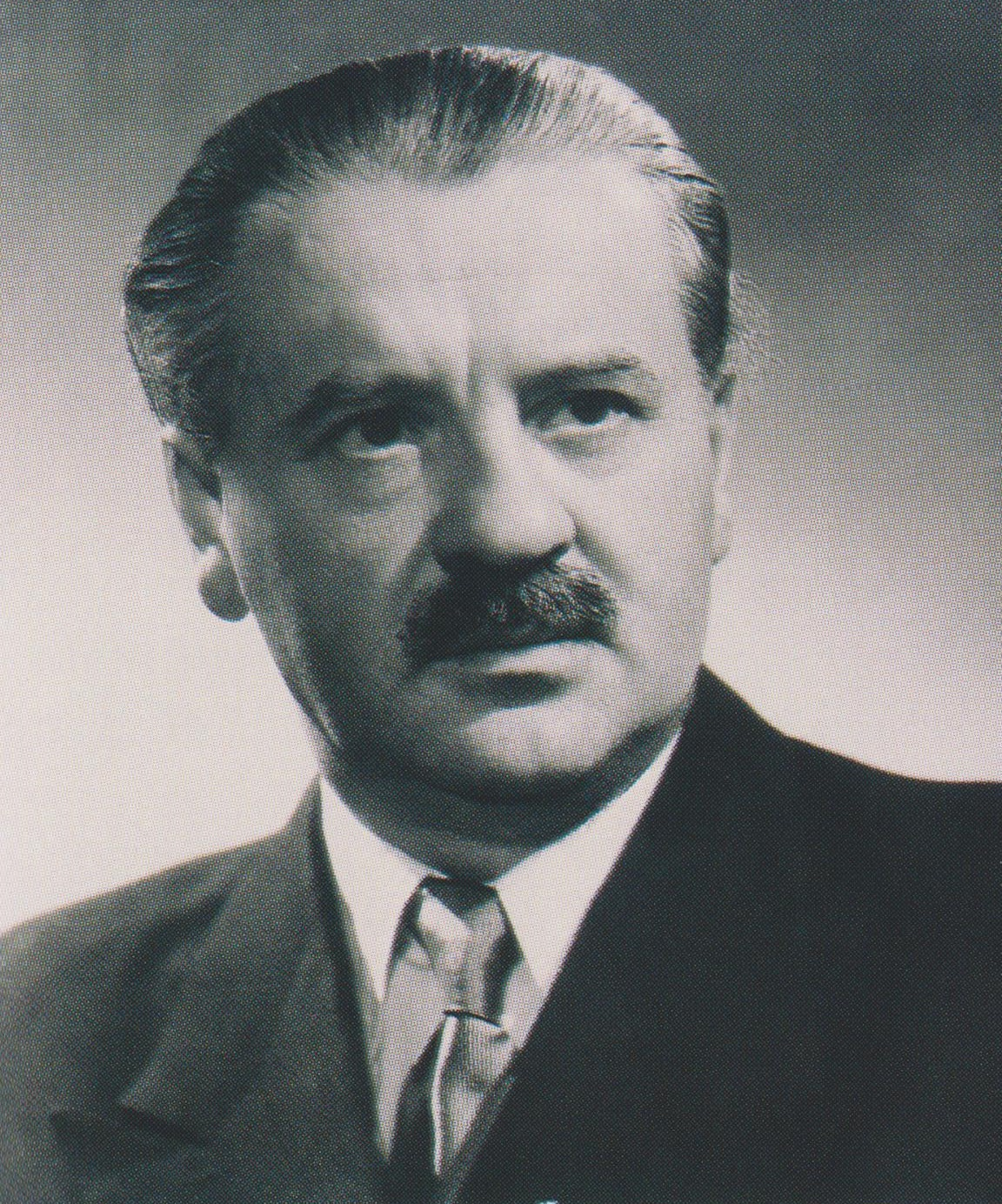
Zoltán Tildy, 1946

- József Kármán (1769–1795), sentimentalist Hungarian author.
- Sándor Petőfi (1823–1849), Hungarian poet and liberal revolutionary.
- Božena Slančíková (1867–1951), pen name Timrava, a Slovak novelist and playwright.
- Zoltán Speidl (1880–1917) Hungarian track and field athlete, competed at the 1900 Summer Olympics
- Ladislav Luppa (1884–1955), regional politician and master butcher.
- Zoltán Tildy (1889–1961), an influential leader of Hungary
- Tibor Serly (1901–1978), Hungarian classical composer
- Margit Bokor (1900–1949), Hungarian opera singer
- Ralph Henry Brewster (1904–1951), American writer and musician, spent several days here in 1942.
- Pavol Szikora (1952–2021), Slovak racewalker
- Ivan Saktor (1954–2021)
- Barouh Berkovits (1926–2012) inventor of demand pacemaker and DC defibrillator.

== Twin towns – sister cities ==
Lučenec is twinned with:

- Louny, Czech Republic
- Mělník, Czech Republic
- Pápa, Hungary
- Polesella, Italy
- Salgótarján, Hungary
- Zolotonosha, Ukraine

== Gallery ==
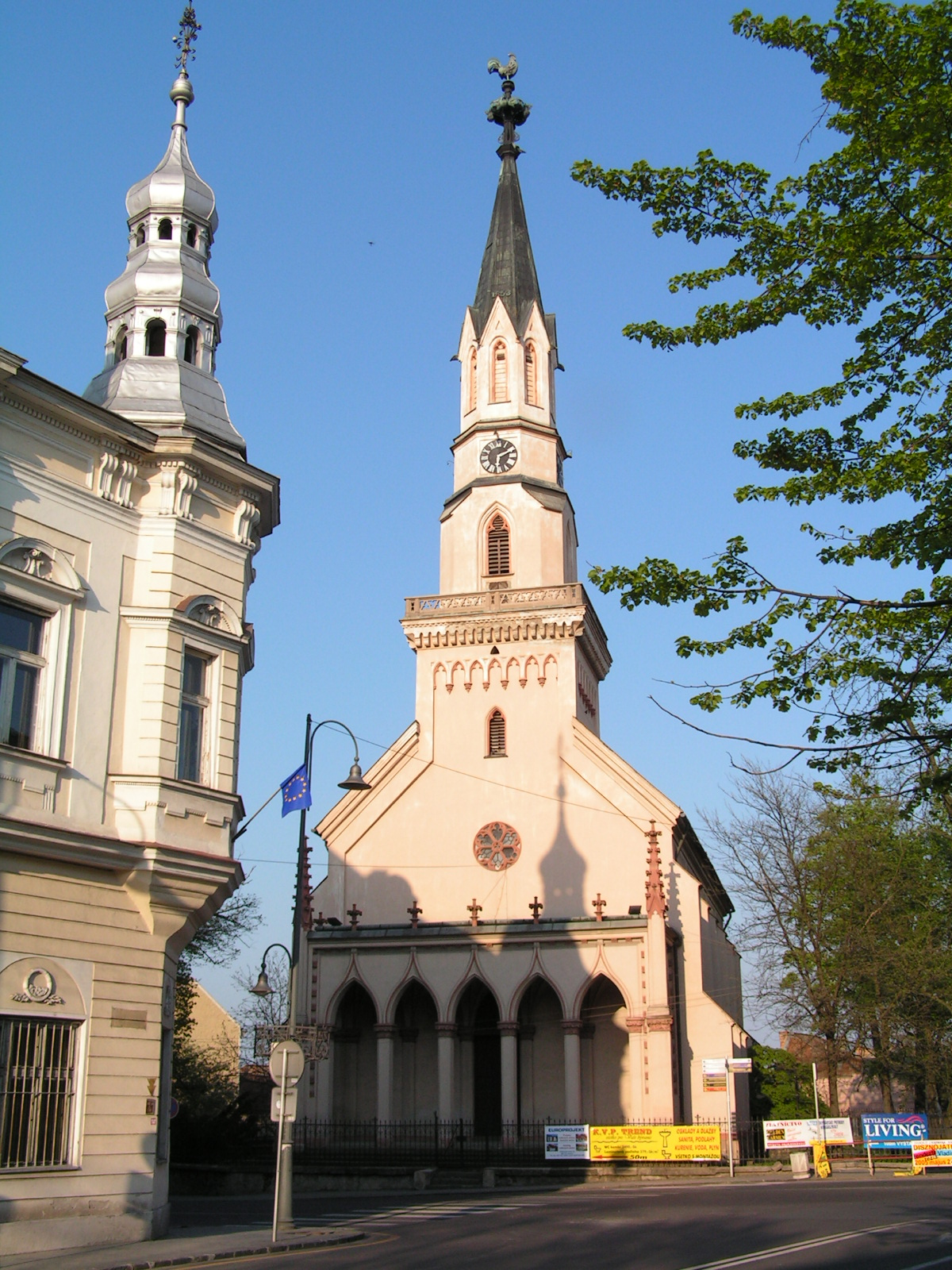
The Calvinist church

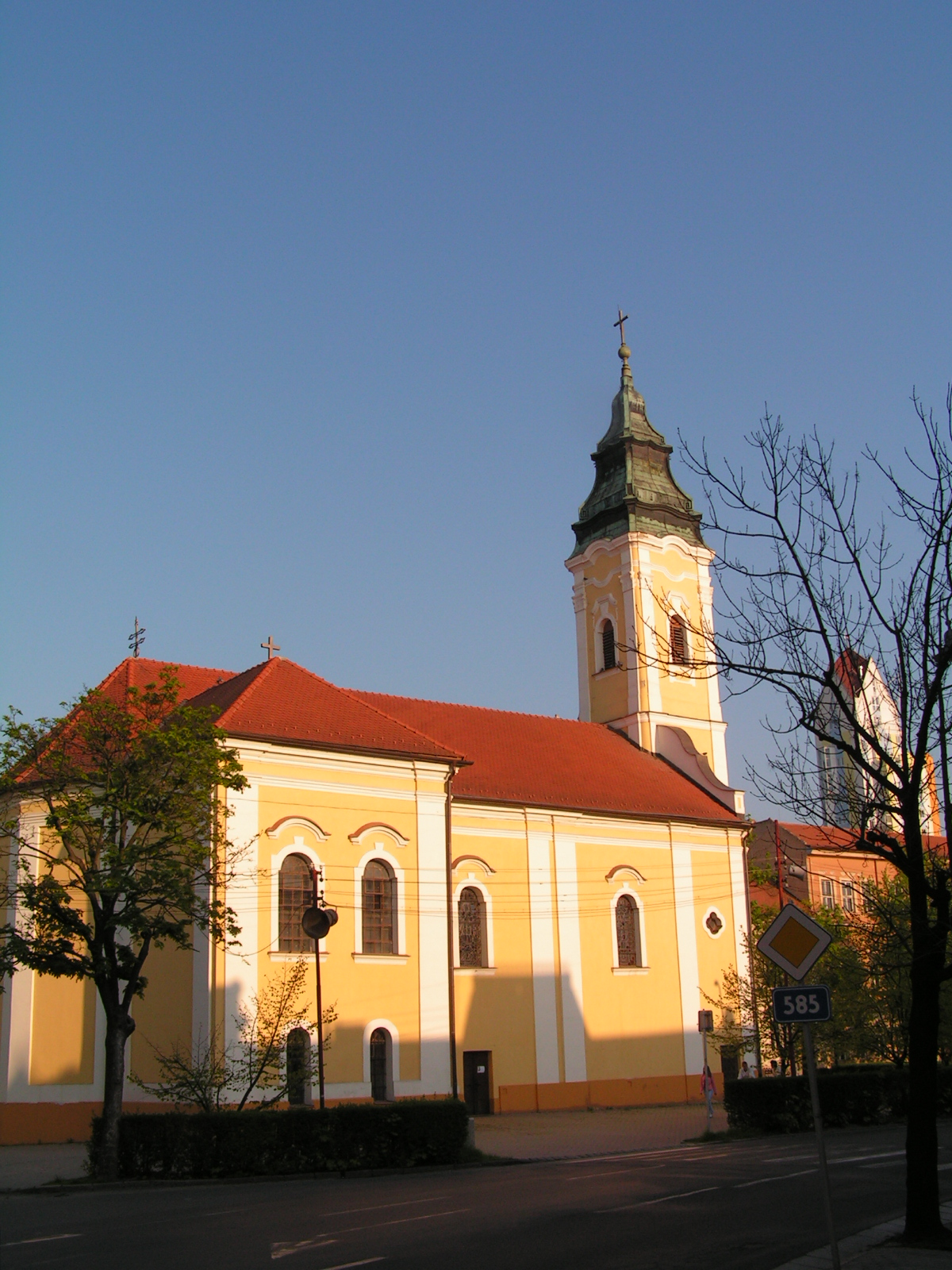
The Roman Catholic church

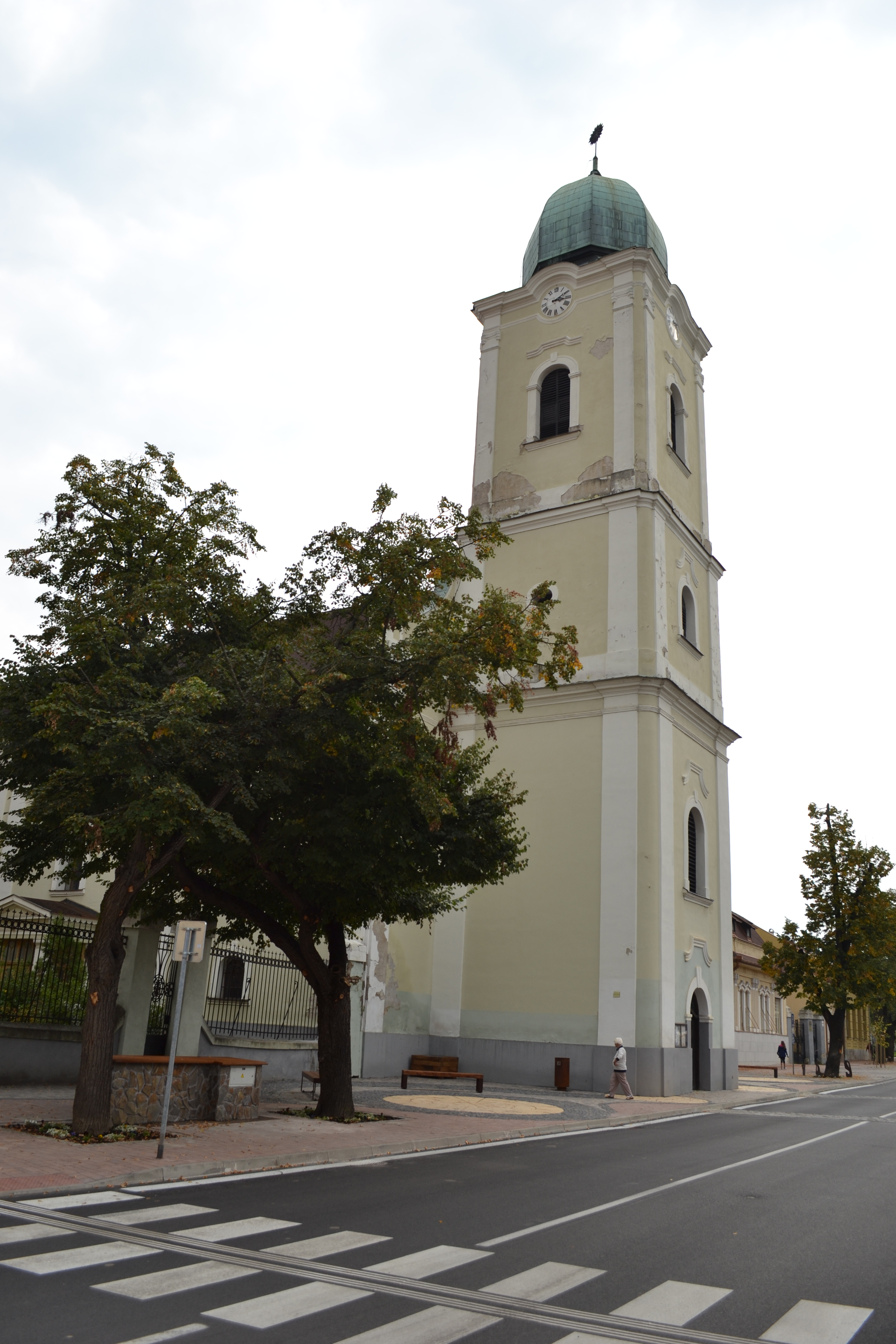
The Lutheran church

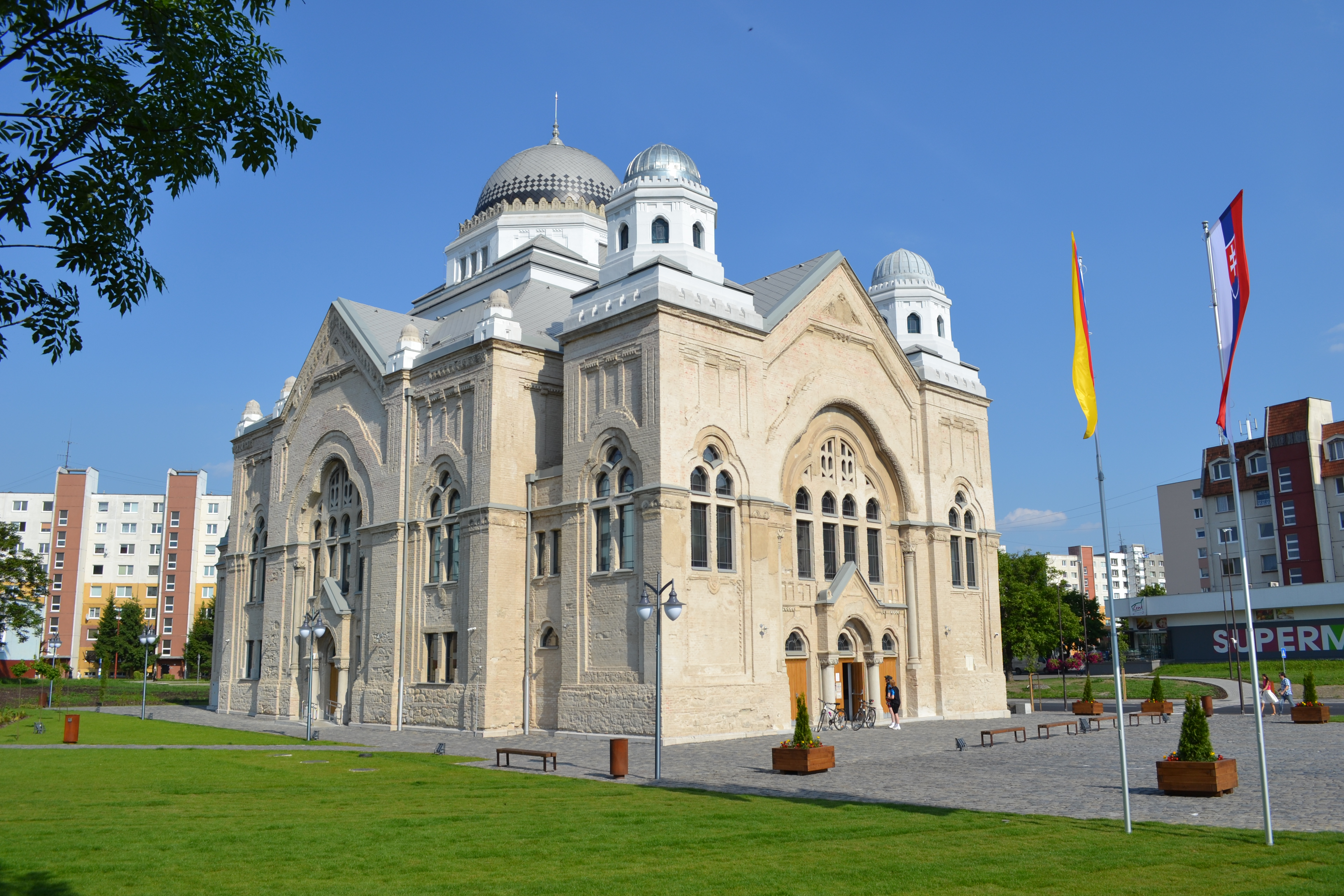
The Synagogue

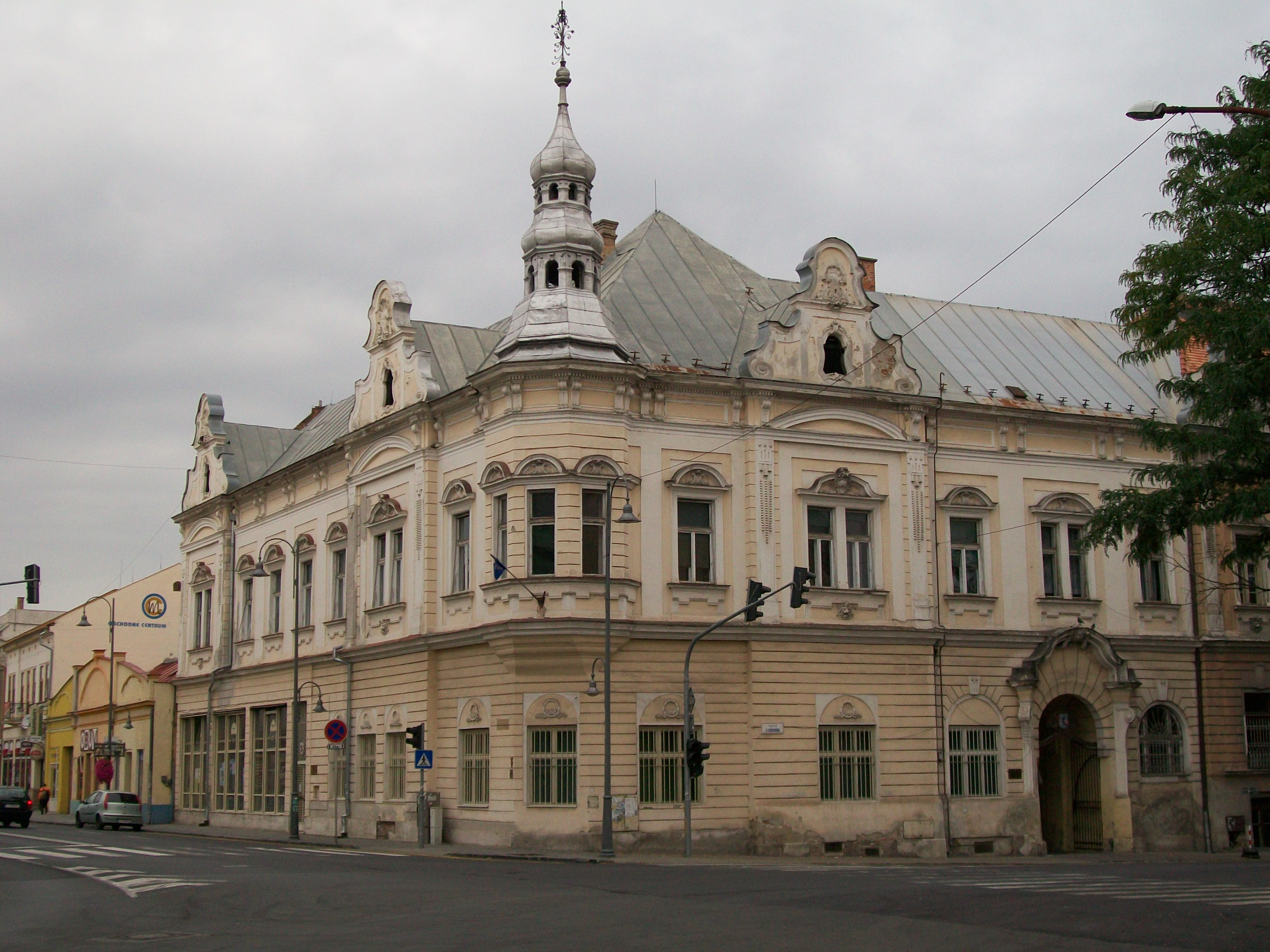
The Novohrad library

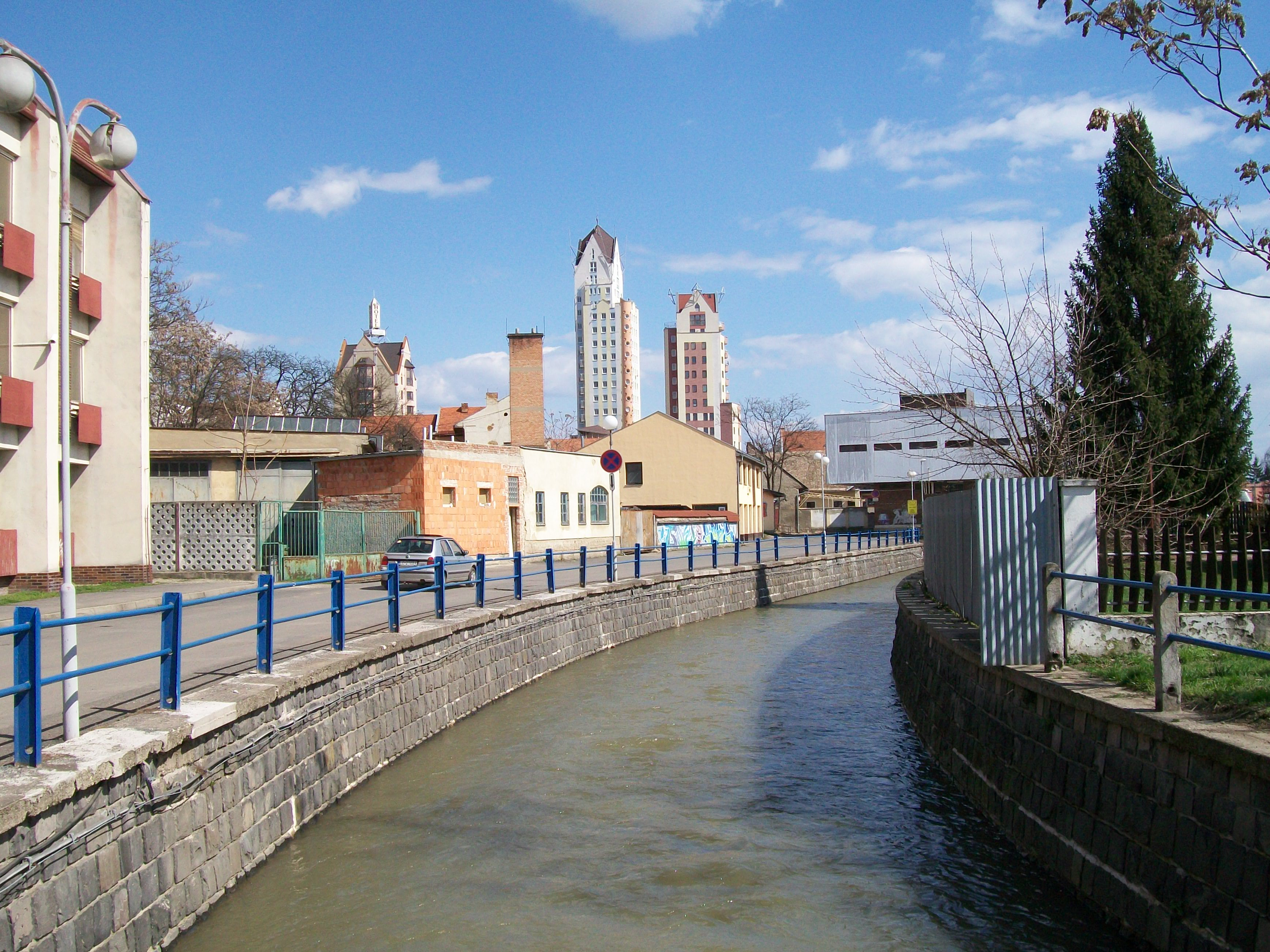
The Tuhár brook

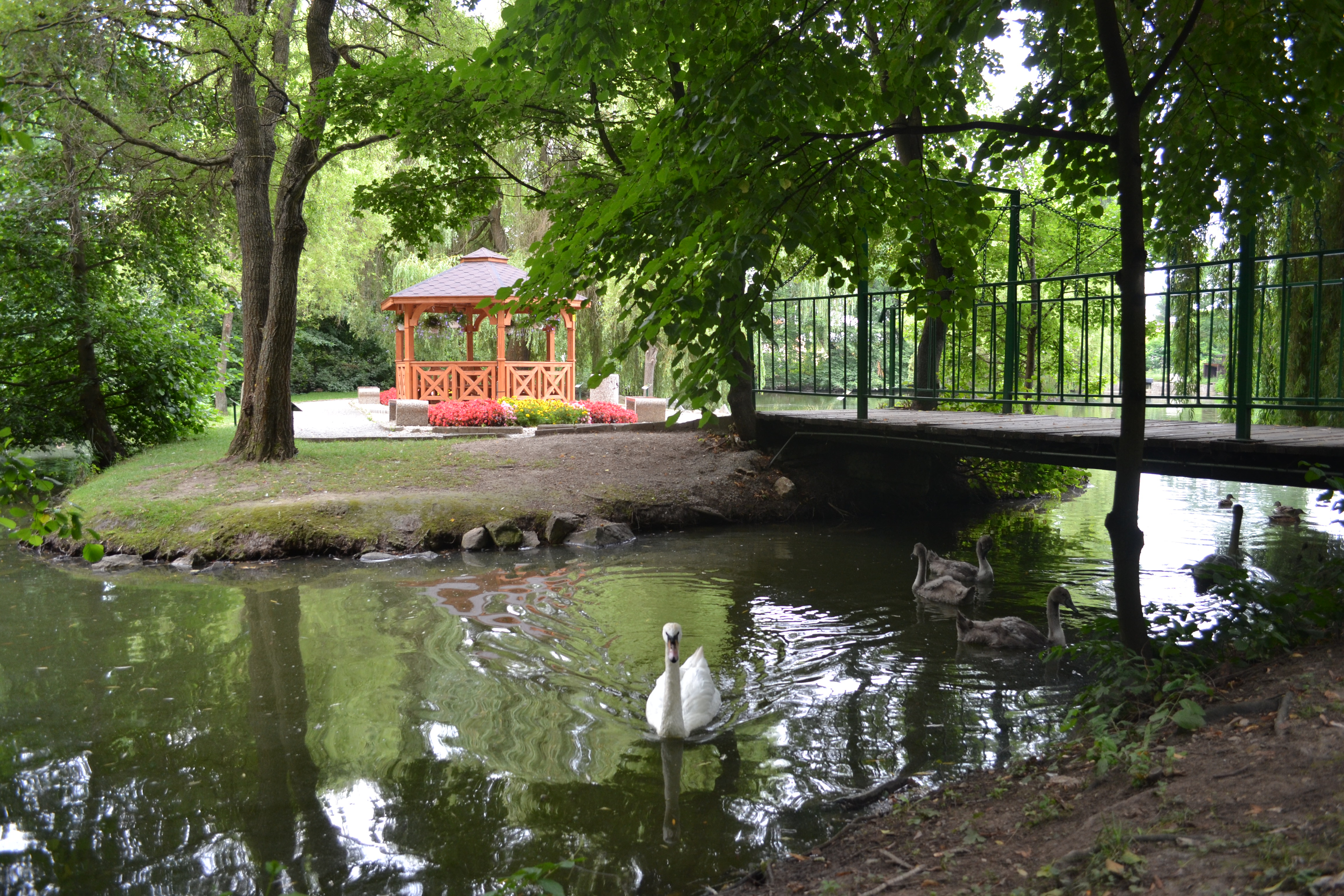
City Park

== Sport ==
FK LAFC Lučenec, funded in 1902, was an association football club based in the town. Currently functioning association football teams include MŠK Novohrad Lučenec.

== See also ==
- List of cultural monuments in Lučenec
