= Vyšný Kubín =

- Municipality
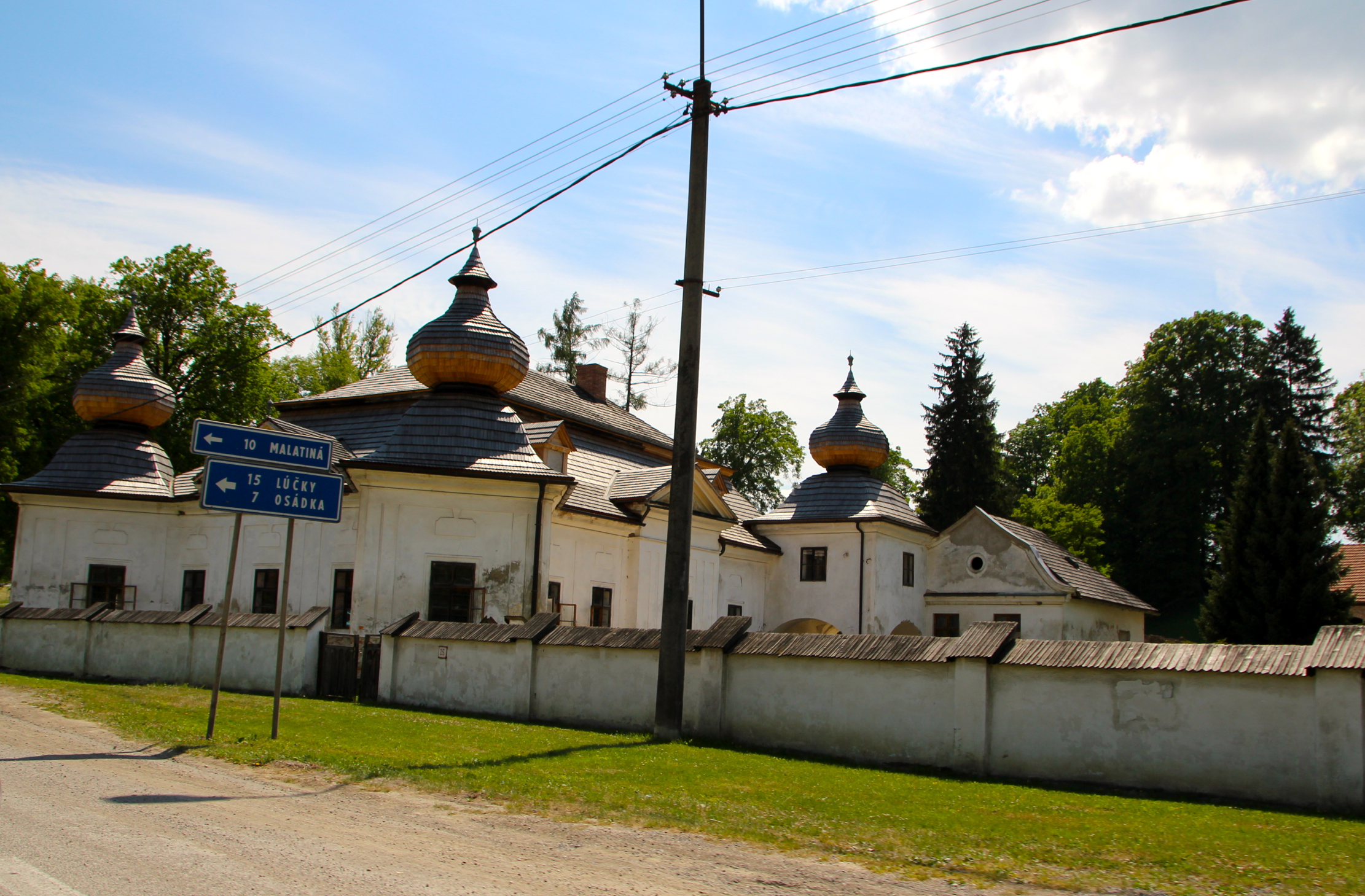

- Flag

- Location of Vyšný Kubín in the Žilina Region Location of Vyšný Kubín in Slovakia
- Coordinates: 49.18°N 19.30°E
- Country: Slovakia
- Region: Žilina Region
- District: Dolný Kubín District
- First mentioned: 1325

Area
  - Total: 12.74 km^{2} (4.92 sq mi)
- Elevation: 522 m (1,713 ft)

Population (2025)
  - Total: 863
- Time zone: UTC+1 (CET)
  - Summer (DST): UTC+2 (CEST)
- Postal code: 270 1
- Area code: +421 43
- Vehicle registration plate (until 2022): DK
- Website: www.vysnykubin.sk

Vyšný Kubín is a village and municipality in Dolný Kubín District in the Žilina Region of northern Slovakia.

== Geography ==
The municipality lies at an altitude of 522 metres (1,713 ft) and covers an area of 12.74 km^{2} (4.92 sq mi) (2025).

== History ==
Before the establishment of independent Czechoslovakia in 1918, Vyšný Kubín was part of Árva County within the Kingdom of Hungary. From 1939 to 1945, it was part of the Slovak Republic.

== Population ==
Population statistic (10 years)
Year	1995	2005	2015	2025
Count	507	563	719	863
Difference		+11.04%	+27.70%	+20.02%

Population statistic
Year	2024	2025
Count	853	863
Difference		+1.17%

It has a population of 863 people (31 December 2025).

=== Ethnicity ===
Census 2021 (1+ %)
Ethnicity	Number	Fraction
Slovak	766	96.23%
Not found out	23	2.88%
Total	796	

In year 2021 was 796 people by ethnicity 766 as Slovak, 23 as Not found out, 4 as Polish, 2 as Czech, 2 as Rusyn, 2 as Other, 1 as Moravian and 1 as Canadian.

Note on population: The difference values of population numbers in the table "Population statistic" and in the sections "Ethnicity" & "Religion" is caused by the use of various statistical methods.

=== Religion ===
Census 2021 (1+ %)
Religion	Number	Fraction
Roman Catholic Church	460	57.79%
Evangelical Church	200	25.13%
None	98	12.31%
Not found out	22	2.76%
Total	796	

In year 2021 was 796 people by religion 460 from Roman Catholic Church, 200 from Evangelical Church, 98 from None, 22 from Not found out, 6 from Other, 3 from Other and not ascertained christian church, 2 from Greek Catholic Church, 2 from Ad hoc movements, 1 from Christian Congregations in Slovakia, 1 from Hinduism and 1 from Buddhism.

== Famous people ==
- Margita Figuli, writer born in Vyšný Kubín
- Pavol Országh Hviezdoslav, poet born in Vyšný Kubín
