= Novohrad-Nógrád Geopark =

UNESCO geopark in Slovakia and Hungary

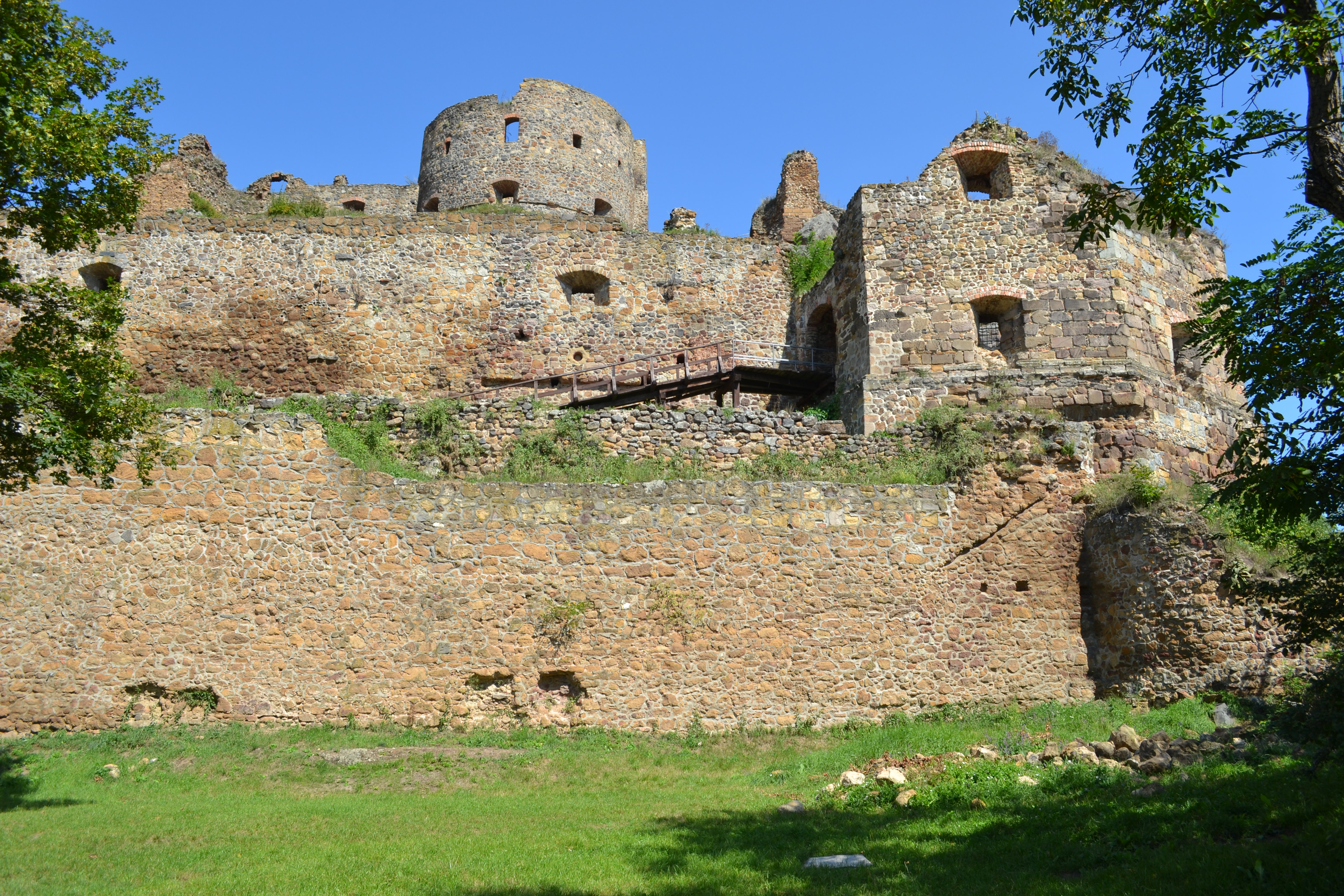
- Fiľakovo castle, a part of the protected area
- Interactive map of Novohrad-Nógrád Geopark
- Location: Banská Bystrica Region, Slovakia

The Novohrad-Nógrád UNESCO Global Geopark is a UNESCO geopark that extends over the territory of 28 municipalities in Slovakia (southern parts of the districts of Rimavská Sobota and Lučenec) and 64 municipalities in Hungary (northern part of Nógrád).

== Location ==
The Geopark in Slovakia covers the territory of the districts of Lučenec (including the town of Fiľakovo and the villages of Belina, Biskupice, Čakanovce, Čamovce, Fiľakovské Kováče, Lipovany, Kalonda, Mučín, Pleš, Prša, Radzovce, Rapovce, Ratka, Šiatorská Bukovinka, Šurice, Šíd, Trebeľovce) and Rimavská Sobota (villages Blhovce, Dubno, Gemerský Jablonec, Hajnáčka, Nová Bašta, Petrovce, Stará Bašta, Studená, Tajchy, Večelkov). On the Hungarian side, it includes the Novohrad-Nógrád UNESCO Global Geopark with 64 villages totaling 167 sites.

Geopark Novohrad-Nógrád
Area of the geopark	total 1,578 km², of which Slovakia 336 km², Hungary 1,251 km²
Geopark protection	CHKO Cerová vrchovina (Slovakia), NP Bükk (Hungary)
Number of geotopes	total 76, with 32 in Slovakia and 44 in Hungary
Presented themes	geology, nature conservation, history, folk culture
Geological characteristics	neovolcanites

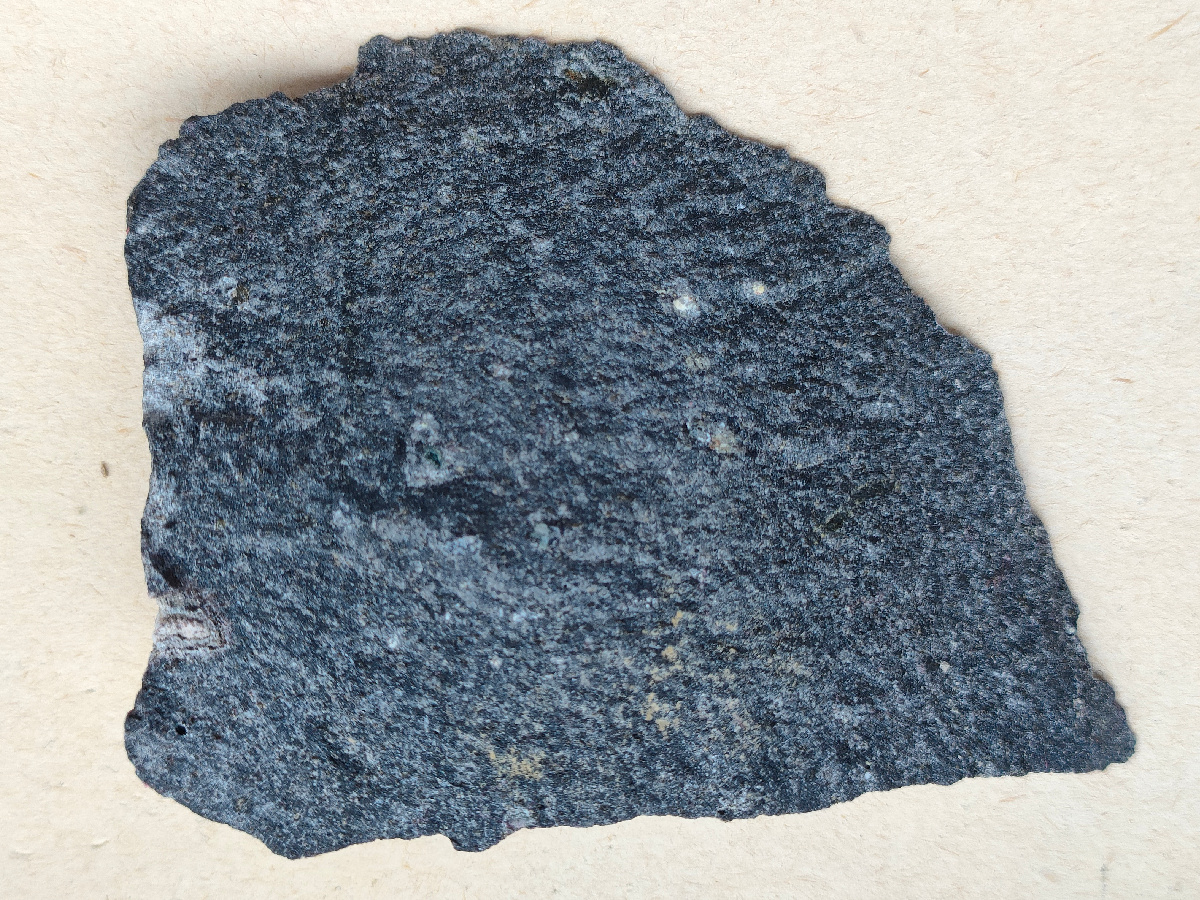
Basalt from the Cerová Vrchovina area

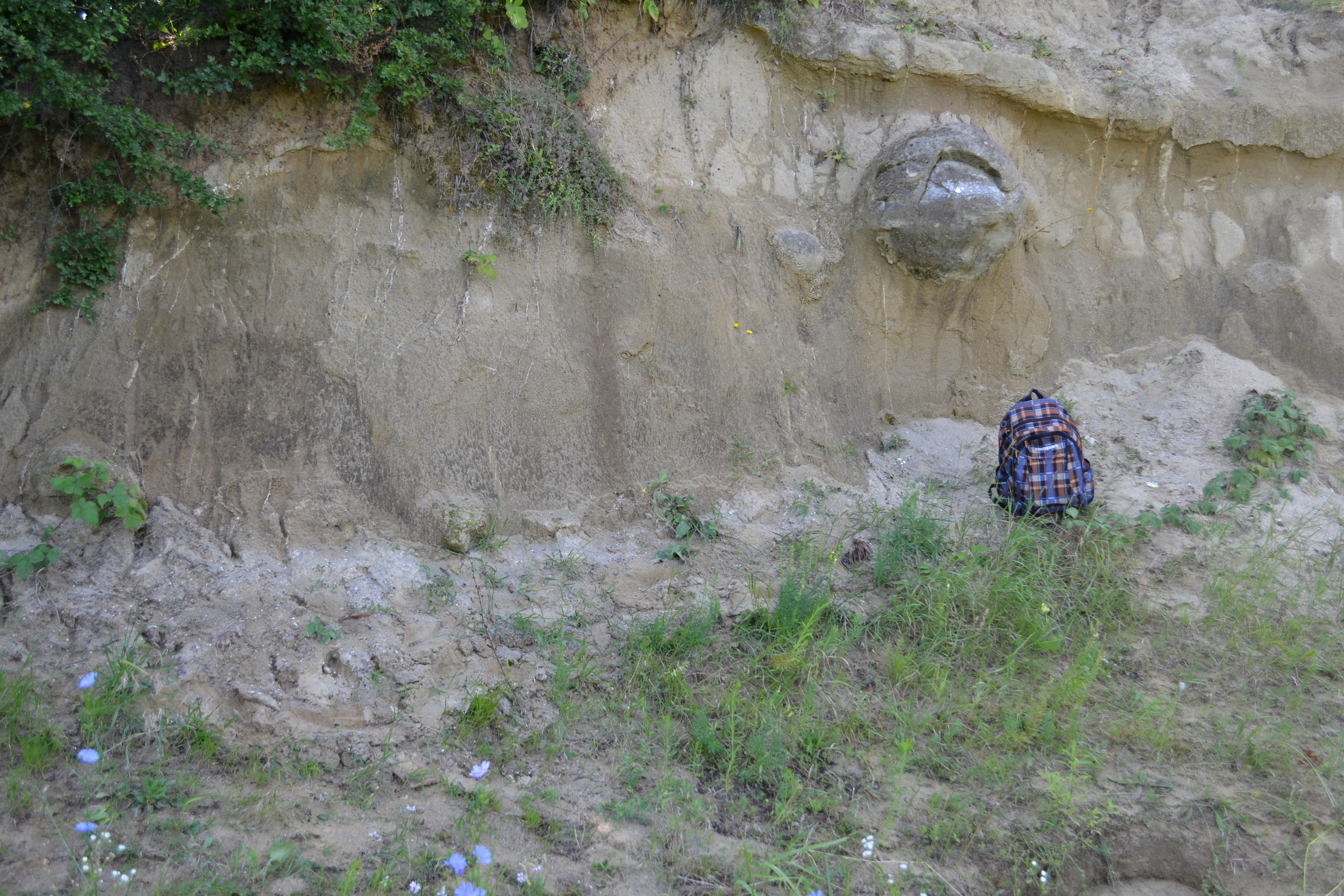
Lipovianske Sandstones

== Geopark Localities ==
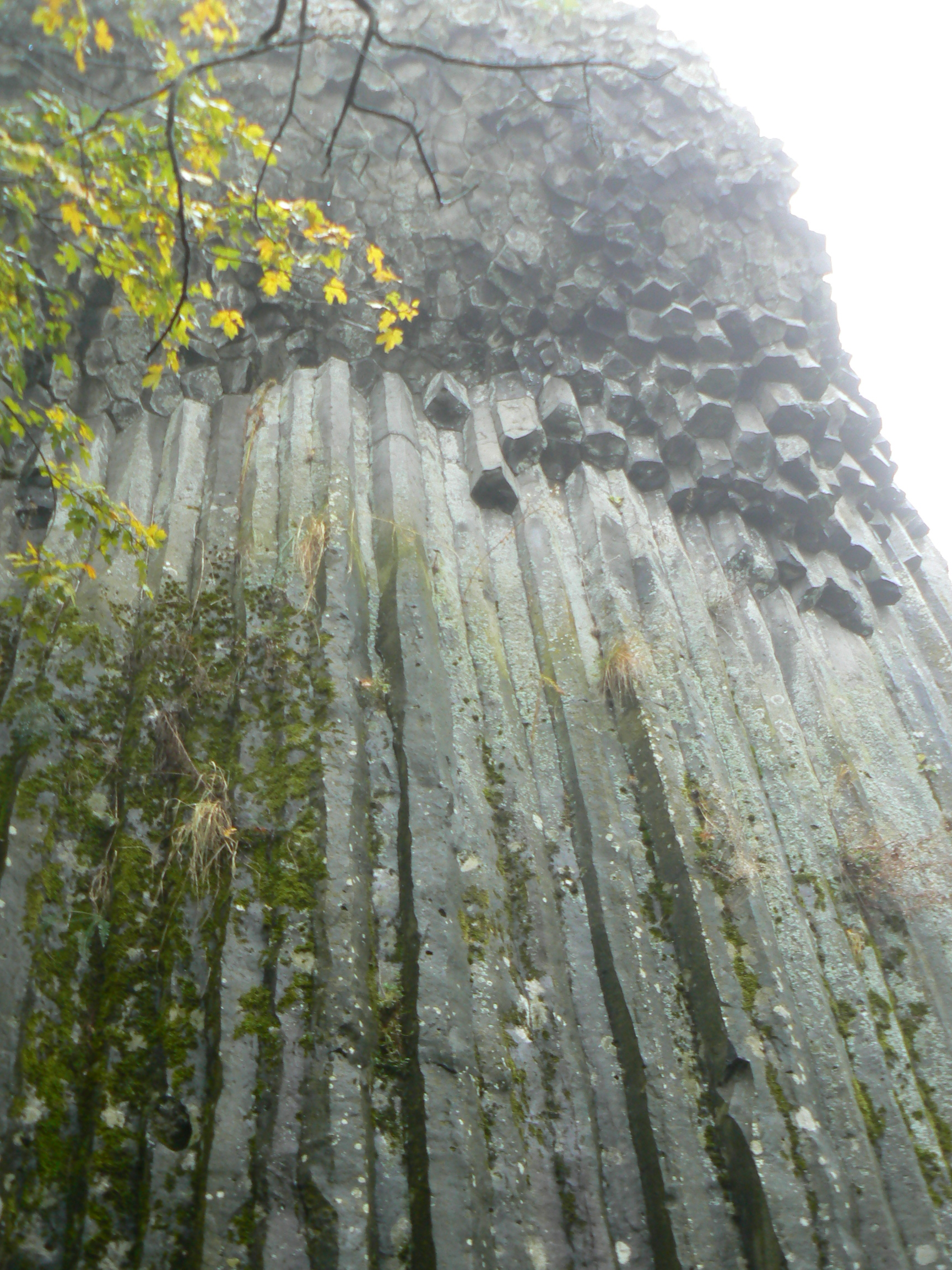
Šomoška stone waterfall

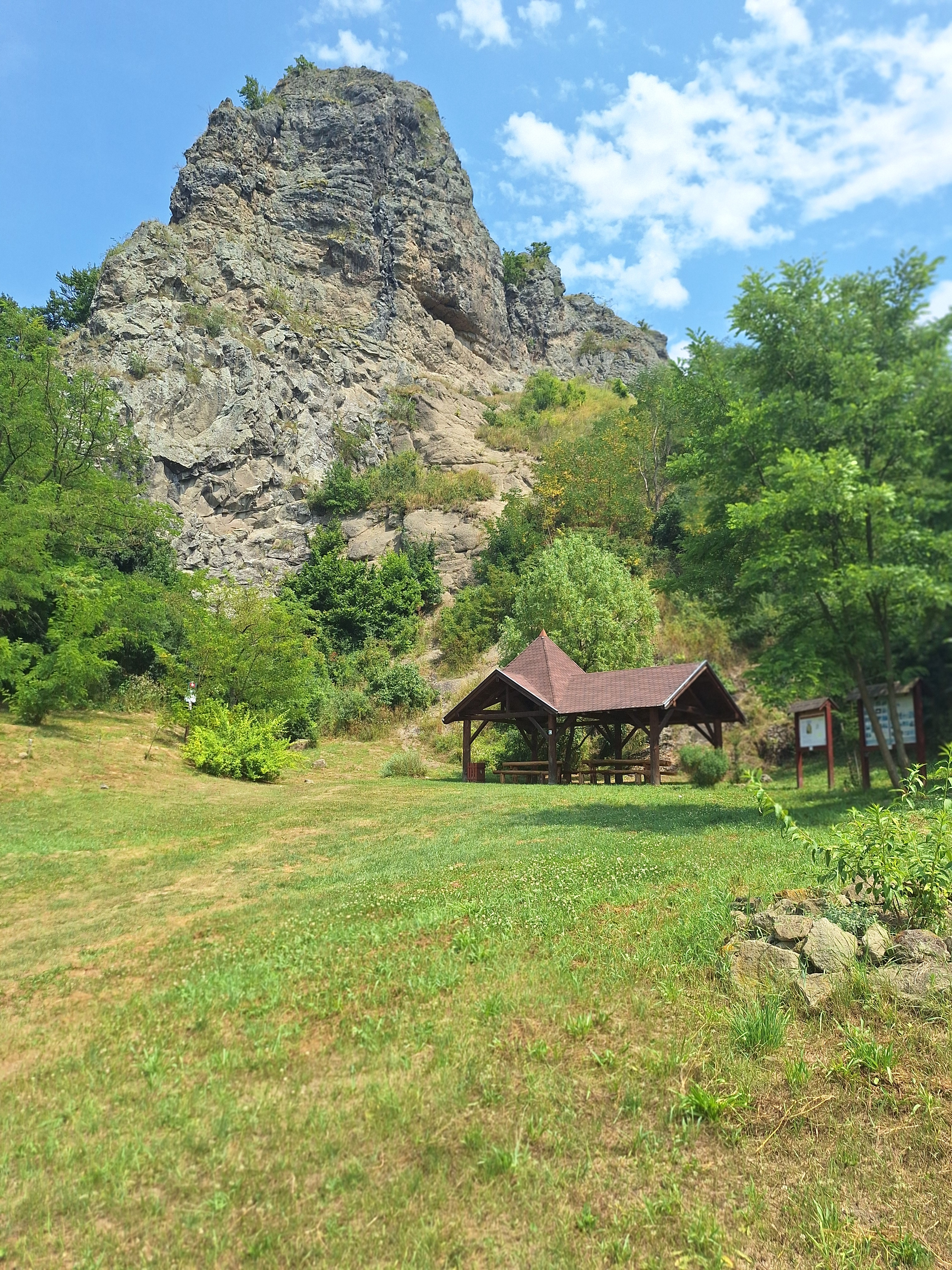
Soví Castle

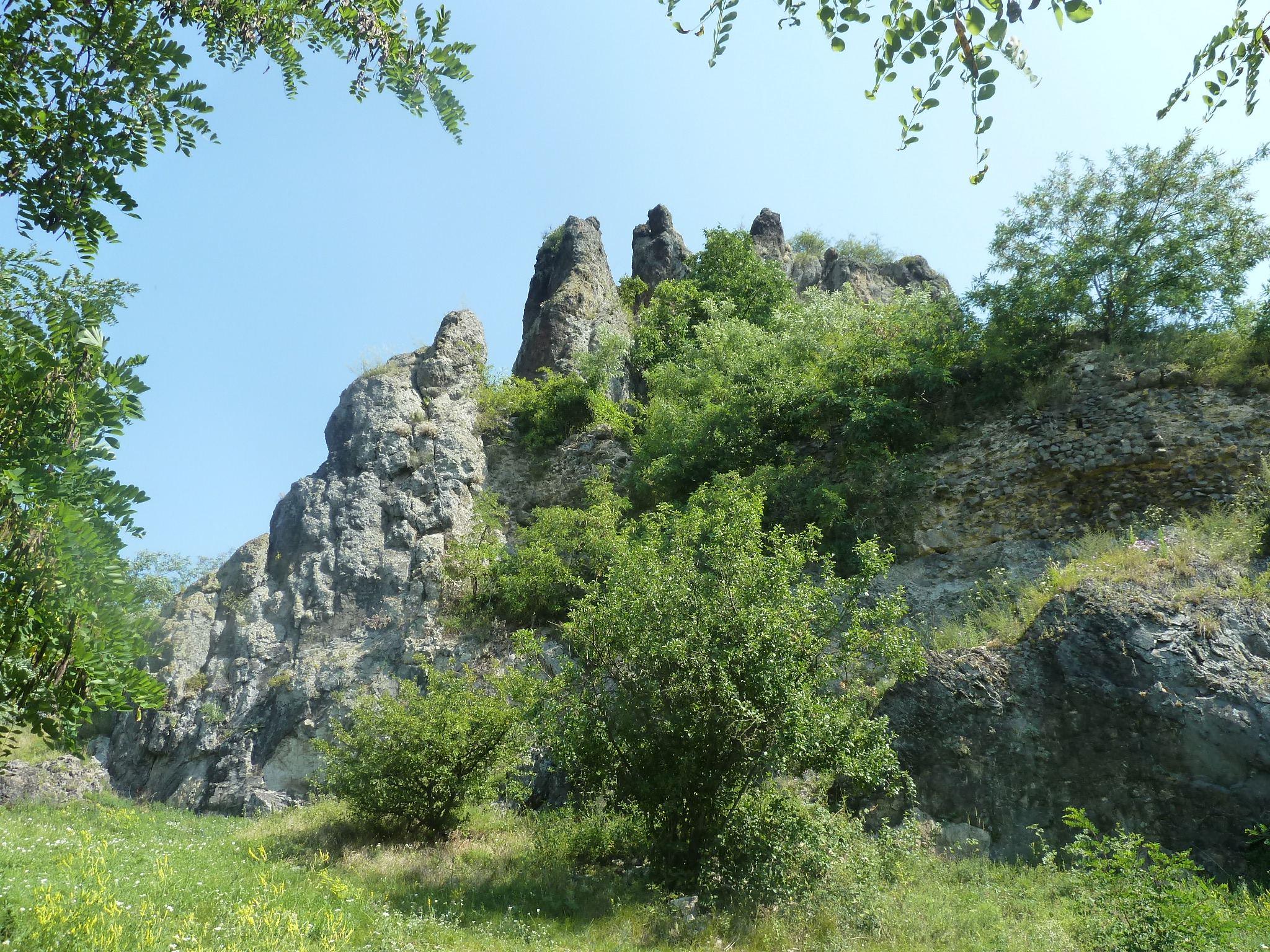
Hajnáčsky Castle Hill

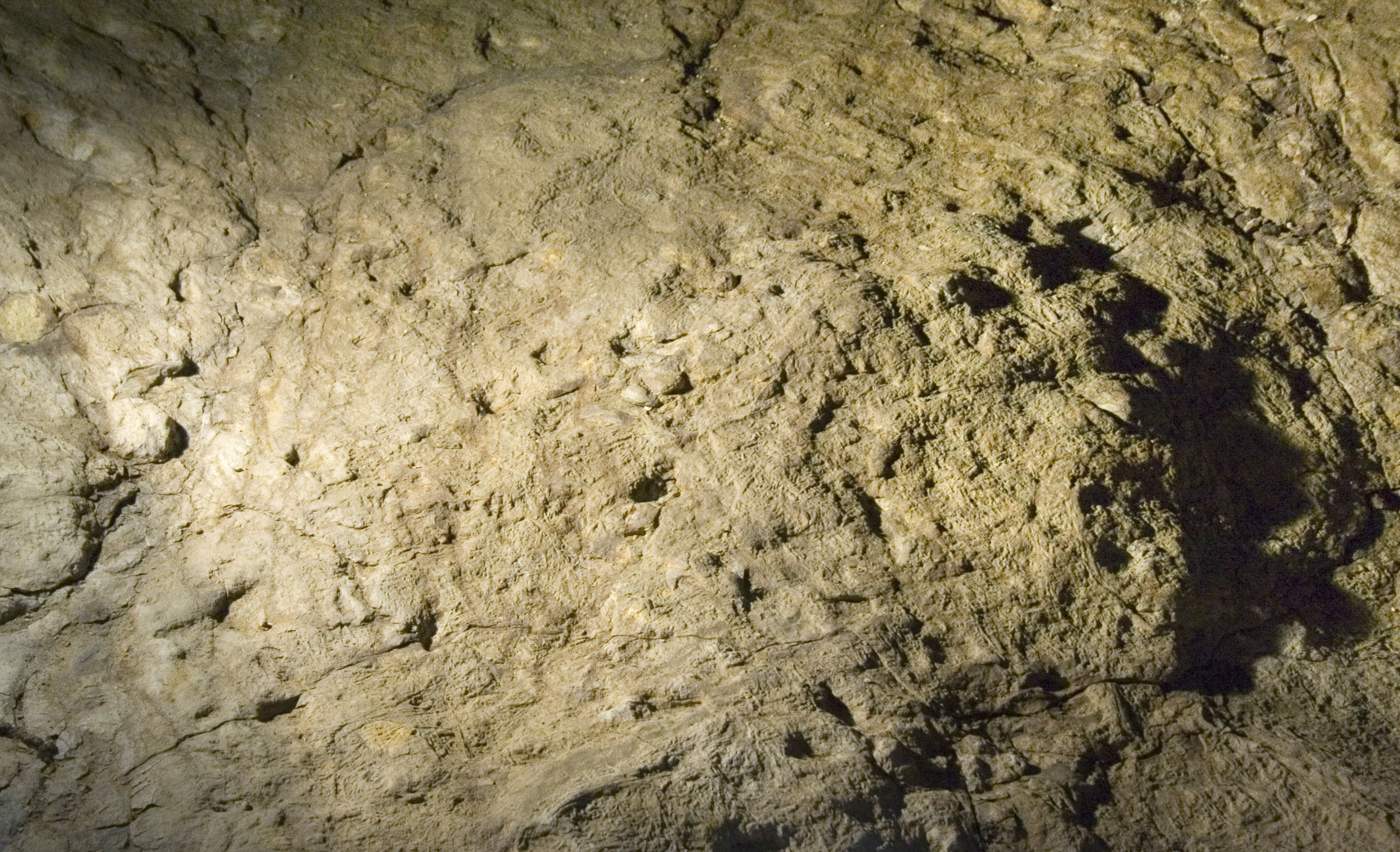
Fossils from the Ipolytarnóc area
