= Csernai =

Csernai is a Hungarian surname. Notable people with the surname include:

- Pál Csernai (1932–2013), Hungarian football player and manager, brother of Tibor
- Tibor Csernai (1938–2012), Hungarian footballer
