= PRSA =

Prsa or PRSA may refer to:

- Prša, a municipality in Slovakia
- Anja Prša (born 1994), Slovenian footballer
- President of the Royal Scottish Academy
- Personal Retirement Savings Account, a type of savings account for the Irish market
- Proportional Representation Society of Australia, an Australian electoral reform group
- Public Relations Society of America, an American trade association
- Parvulin-like peptidyl-prolyl isomerase, an enzyme
