= Čakanovce =

Čakanovce refers to several villages and municipalities in Slovakia:

- Čakanovce, Lučenec District in the Banská Bystrica Region
- Čakanovce, Košice-okolie District in the Košice Region
