= Dubno (disambiguation) =

Dubno is a city in the Rivne Oblast of western Ukraine.

Dubno may also refer to:

- Dubno, Podlaskie Voivodeship, Poland
- Dubno (Příbram District), a village and municipality in the Central Bohemian Region, Czech Republic
- Dubno, Rimavská Sobota District, a village in the Banská Bystrica Region, Slovakia
- Dubno Raion, Rivne Oblast, Ukraine
