= Pilis =

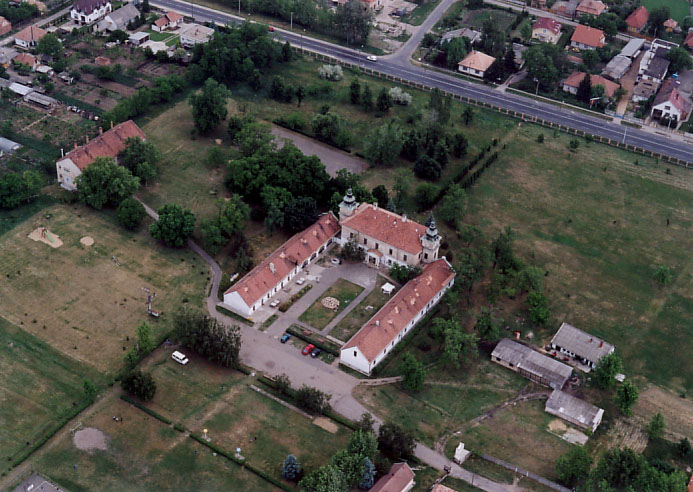
- The Beleznay-Nyári Palace from the air

- Coat of arms

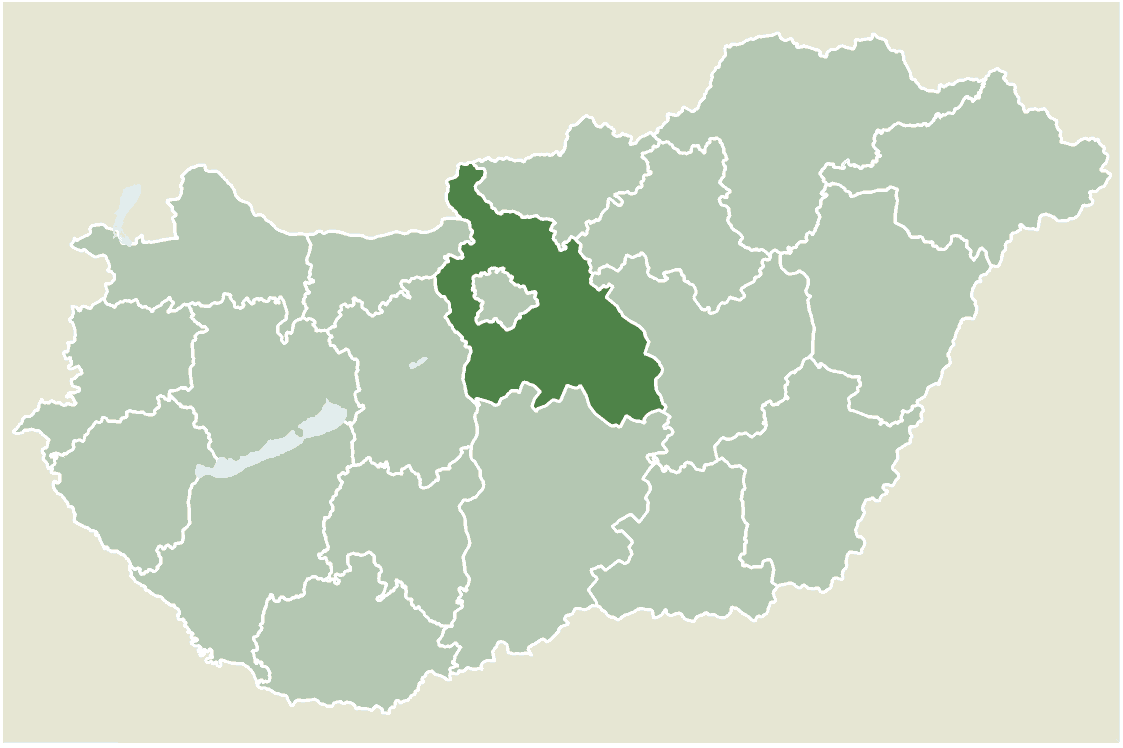
- Location of Pest county in Hungary

- Location of Pilis
- Coordinates: 47.28438°N 19.54347°E
- Country: Hungary
- County: Pest

Area
  - Total: 47.33 km^{2} (18.27 sq mi)

Population (2004)
  - Total: 11,432
  - Density: 241.5/km^{2} (625.6/sq mi)
- Time zone: UTC+1 (CET)
  - Summer (DST): UTC+2 (CEST)
- Postal code: 2721
- Area code: 29

Pilis (Hungarian pronunciation: [ˈpiliʃ]) is a town in Pest County, Hungary.

== History ==
The town was inhabited in prehistoric times, but was abandoned at the end of the Roman rule. Pilis was then first mentioned in 1326. It was destroyed during the Ottoman rule in the 16th century, and was reestablished only in 1711, by János Beleznay, the local landlord. He brought Slovak settlers from Upper Hungary, and built a palace in 1717 for himself and his family. The Beleznay family sold the town and its surroundings in the 19th century to the Nyári family, who renamed the palace to "Beleznay-Nyári palace".

Even though the town's ethnic composition has changed in the last centuries, there is still a sizable Slovak minority which has its own local government that is responsible for keeping the Slovak traditions and memories of Pilis.

== Etymology ==
The name comes from Slavic Pleš – bald (area or mountain), an area with sparse or missing trees or vegetation. There are similar names in several Slavic countries including e.g. Pleš, Slovakia (1319 Pilis).

Some point out the similarity between the Lithuanian word "pilis" (meaning castle) and the Hungarian town's name.

== Notable people ==
- Pál Csernai (1932–2013), football player and manager
- Tibor Csernai (1938–2012), footballer

== Twin towns – sister cities ==
Pilis is twinned with:

- Piazza al Serchio, Italy
