= Tibor Csernai =

Hungarian footballer (1938–2012)

Personal information
- Date of birth: 3 December 1938
- Place of birth: Pilis, Hungary
- Date of death: 11 September 2012 (aged 73)
- Place of death: Tatabánya, Hungary
- Height: 1.75 m (5 ft 9 in)
- Position: Forward

International career
| Years | Team | Apps | (Gls) |
| 1964 | Hungary Olympics | 4 | (6) |
Medal record
Men's football
Representing Hungary
Olympic Games
| Gold medal – first place | 1964 Tokyo | Team competition |

Tibor Csernai (3 December 1938 – 11 September 2012) was a Hungarian footballer who competed at the 1964 Summer Olympics. He was part of the gold medal winning team. His brother is Pál Csernai.
