= Večelkov =

Municipality of Slovakia

Večelkov Vecseklő
- Municipality
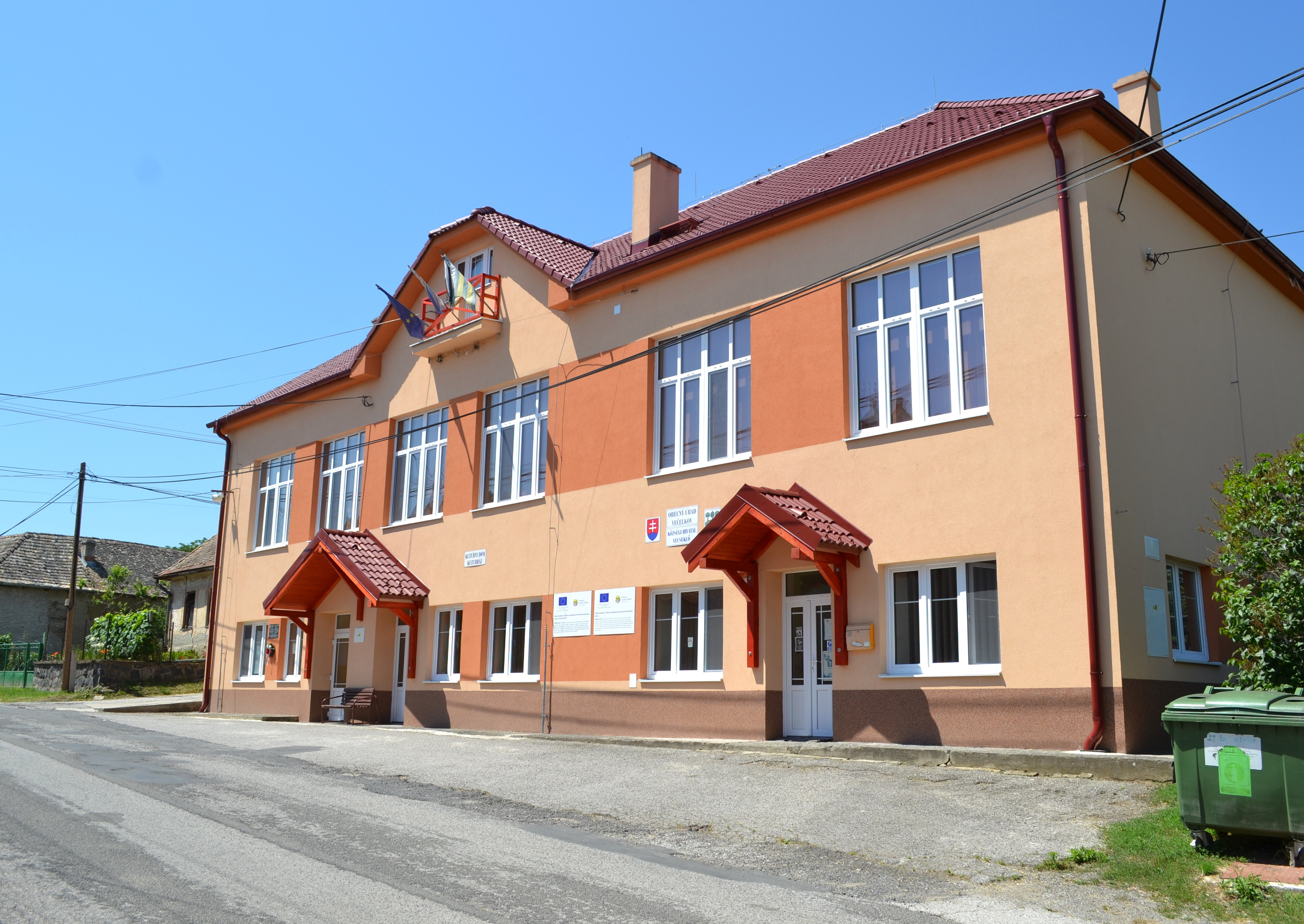

- Flag

- Location of Večelkov in the Banská Bystrica Region Location of Večelkov in Slovakia
- Coordinates: 48.17°N 19.93°E
- Country: Slovakia
- Region: Banská Bystrica Region
- District: Rimavská Sobota District
- First mentioned: 1548

Area
  - Total: 5.33 km^{2} (2.06 sq mi)
- Elevation: 292 m (958 ft)

Population (2025)
  - Total: 222
- Time zone: UTC+1 (CET)
  - Summer (DST): UTC+2 (CEST)
- Postal code: 980 34
- Area code: +421 47
- Vehicle registration plate (until 2022): RS
- Website: www.vecelkov.sk

Večelkov (Hungarian: Vecseklő) is a village and municipality in the Rimavská Sobota District of the Banská Bystrica Region of southern Slovakia.

== Geography ==
The municipality lies at an altitude of 292 metres (958 ft) and covers an area of 5.33 km^{2} (2.06 sq mi) (2025).

== Population ==
Population statistic (10 years)
Year	1995	2005	2015	2025
Count	342	276	241	222
Difference		−19.29%	−12.68%	−7.88%

Population statistic
Year	2024	2025
Count	221	222
Difference		+0.45%

It has a population of 222 people (31 December 2025).

=== Ethnicity ===
Census 2021 (1+ %)
Ethnicity	Number	Fraction
Hungarian	204	88.31%
Slovak	36	15.58%
Romani	9	3.89%
Not found out	9	3.89%
Other	5	2.16%
Total	231	

In year 2021 was 231 people by ethnicity 204 as Hungarian, 36 as Slovak, 9 as Romani, 9 as Not found out and 5 as Other.

Note on population: The difference values of population numbers in the table "Population statistic" and in the sections "Ethnicity" & "Religion" is caused by the use of various statistical methods.

=== Religion ===
Census 2021 (1+ %)
Religion	Number	Fraction
Roman Catholic Church	194	83.98%
None	21	9.09%
Not found out	6	2.6%
Calvinist Church	5	2.16%
Greek Catholic Church	3	1.3%
Total	231	

In year 2021 was 231 people by religion 194 from Roman Catholic Church, 21 from None, 6 from Not found out, 5 from Calvinist Church, 3 from Greek Catholic Church and 2 from Evangelical Church.
