= Petrovce, Vranov nad Topľou District =

Municipality of Slovakia

Petrovce
- Municipality
- Flag

- Location of Petrovce in the Prešov Region Location of Petrovce in Slovakia
- Coordinates: 49°00′00″N 21°29′00″E
- Country: Slovakia
- Region: Prešov Region
- District: Vranov nad Topľou District
- First mentioned: 1412

Area
  - Total: 13.70 km^{2} (5.29 sq mi)
- Elevation: 309 m (1,014 ft)

Population (2025)
  - Total: 438
- Time zone: UTC+1 (CET)
  - Summer (DST): UTC+2 (CEST)
- Postal code: 943 1
- Area code: +421 57
- Vehicle registration plate (until 2022): VT
- Website: www.obecpetrovce.sk

Petrovce (Hungarian: Pétervágása) is a village and municipality in Vranov nad Topľou District in the Prešov Region of eastern Slovakia.

== History ==
In historical records the village was first mentioned in 1412.

== Geography ==
The municipality lies at an altitude of 309 metres (1,014 ft) and covers an area of 13.70 km^{2} (5.29 sq mi) (2025).

== Population ==
Population statistic (10 years)
Year	1995	2005	2015	2025
Count	437	440	449	438
Difference		+0.68%	+2.04%	−2.44%

Population statistic
Year	2024	2025
Count	441	438
Difference		−0.68%

It has a population of 438 people (31 December 2025).

=== Ethnicity ===
Census 2021 (1+ %)
Ethnicity	Number	Fraction
Slovak	450	100%
Total	450	

In year 2021 was 450 people by ethnicity 450 as Slovak, 3 as Russian, 1 as Rusyn and 1 as Not found out.

Note on population: The difference values of population numbers in the table "Population statistic" and in the sections "Ethnicity" & "Religion" is caused by the use of various statistical methods.

=== Religion ===
Census 2021 (1+ %)
Religion	Number	Fraction
Evangelical Church	392	87.11%
Roman Catholic Church	34	7.56%
None	12	2.67%
Greek Catholic Church	5	1.11%
Total	450	

In year 2021 was 450 people by religion 392 from Evangelical Church, 34 from Roman Catholic Church, 12 from None, 5 from Greek Catholic Church, 4 from Eastern Orthodox Church, 1 from Jehovah's Witnesses, 1 from Not found out and 1 from Ad hoc movements.

== Government ==
The village relies on the tax and district offices, and fire brigade at Michalovce and relies on the police force and birth registry at Trhovište.
