= Stará Bašta =

Stará Bašta Óbást
- Municipality
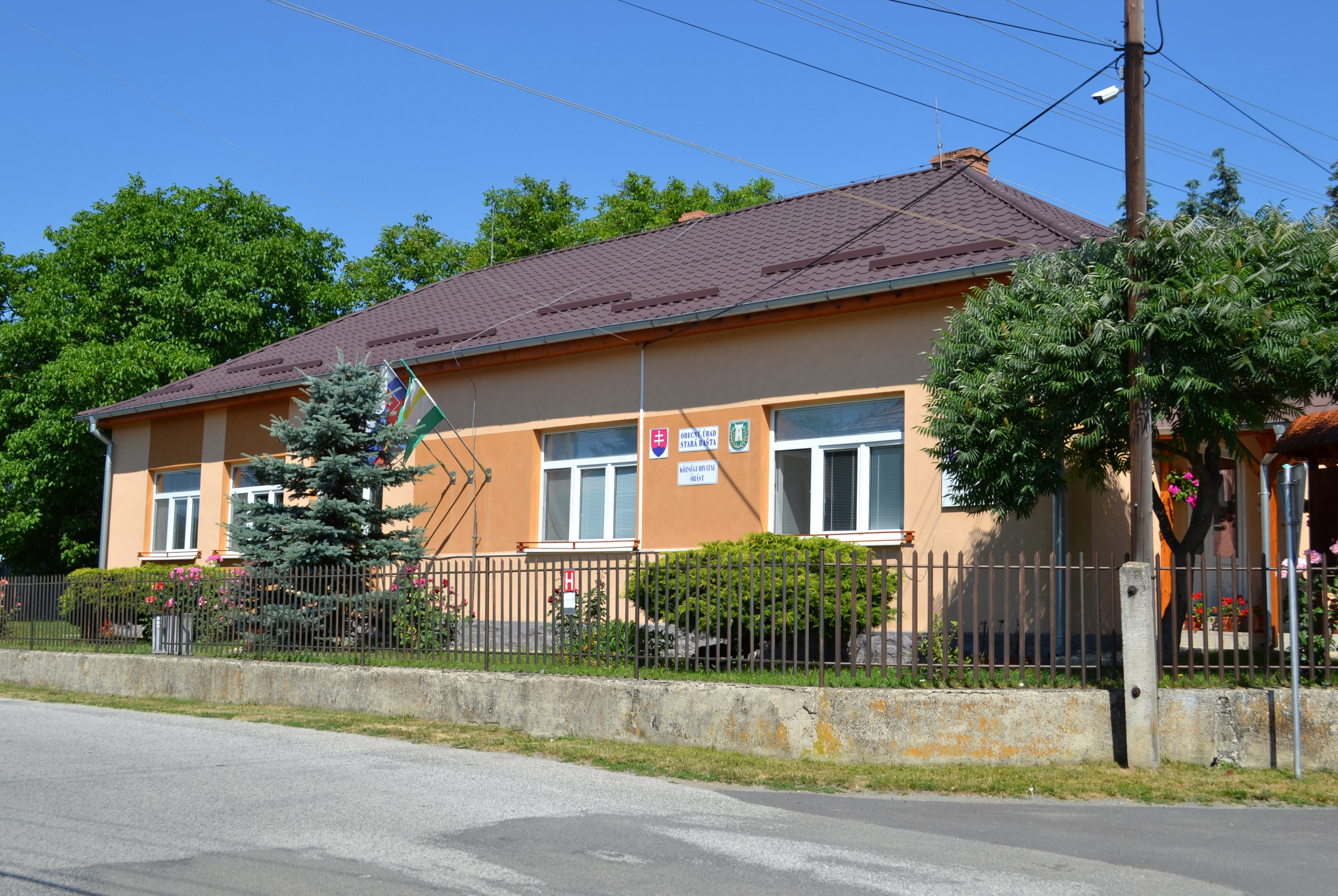

- Flag

- Location of Stará Bašta in the Banská Bystrica Region Location of Stará Bašta in Slovakia
- Coordinates: 48.18°N 19.95°E
- Country: Slovakia
- Region: Banská Bystrica Region
- District: Rimavská Sobota District
- First mentioned: 1455

Area
  - Total: 8.37 km^{2} (3.23 sq mi)
- Elevation: 269 m (883 ft)

Population (2025)
  - Total: 327
- Time zone: UTC+1 (CET)
  - Summer (DST): UTC+2 (CEST)
- Postal code: 980 34
- Area code: +421 47
- Vehicle registration plate (until 2022): RS
- Website: www.starabasta.sk

Stará Bašta (Hungarian: Óbást) is a village and municipality in the Rimavská Sobota District of the Banská Bystrica Region of southern Slovakia.

== Geography ==
The municipality lies at an altitude of 269 metres (883 ft) and covers an area of 8.37 km^{2} (3.23 sq mi) (2025).

== Population ==
Population statistic (10 years)
Year	1995	2005	2015	2025
Count	418	357	317	327
Difference		−14.59%	−11.20%	+3.15%

Population statistic
Year	2024	2025
Count	323	327
Difference		+1.23%

It has a population of 327 people (31 December 2025).

=== Ethnicity ===
Census 2021 (1+ %)
Ethnicity	Number	Fraction
Hungarian	276	89.61%
Slovak	32	10.38%
Not found out	19	6.16%
Romani	6	1.94%
Total	308	

In year 2021 was 308 people by ethnicity 276 as Hungarian, 32 as Slovak, 19 as Not found out, 6 as Romani, 1 as Czech and 1 as Moravian.

Note on population: The difference values of population numbers in the table "Population statistic" and in the sections "Ethnicity" & "Religion" is caused by the use of various statistical methods.

=== Religion ===
Census 2021 (1+ %)
Religion	Number	Fraction
Roman Catholic Church	254	82.47%
Not found out	18	5.84%
None	18	5.84%
Calvinist Church	8	2.6%
Total	308	

In year 2021 was 308 people by religion 254 from Roman Catholic Church, 18 from Not found out, 18 from None, 8 from Calvinist Church, 3 from Other and not ascertained christian church, 3 from Christian Congregations in Slovakia, 3 from Evangelical Church and 1 from Greek Catholic Church.
