= Blhovce =

Village and municipality in Slovakia

Blhovce Balogfala
- Municipality
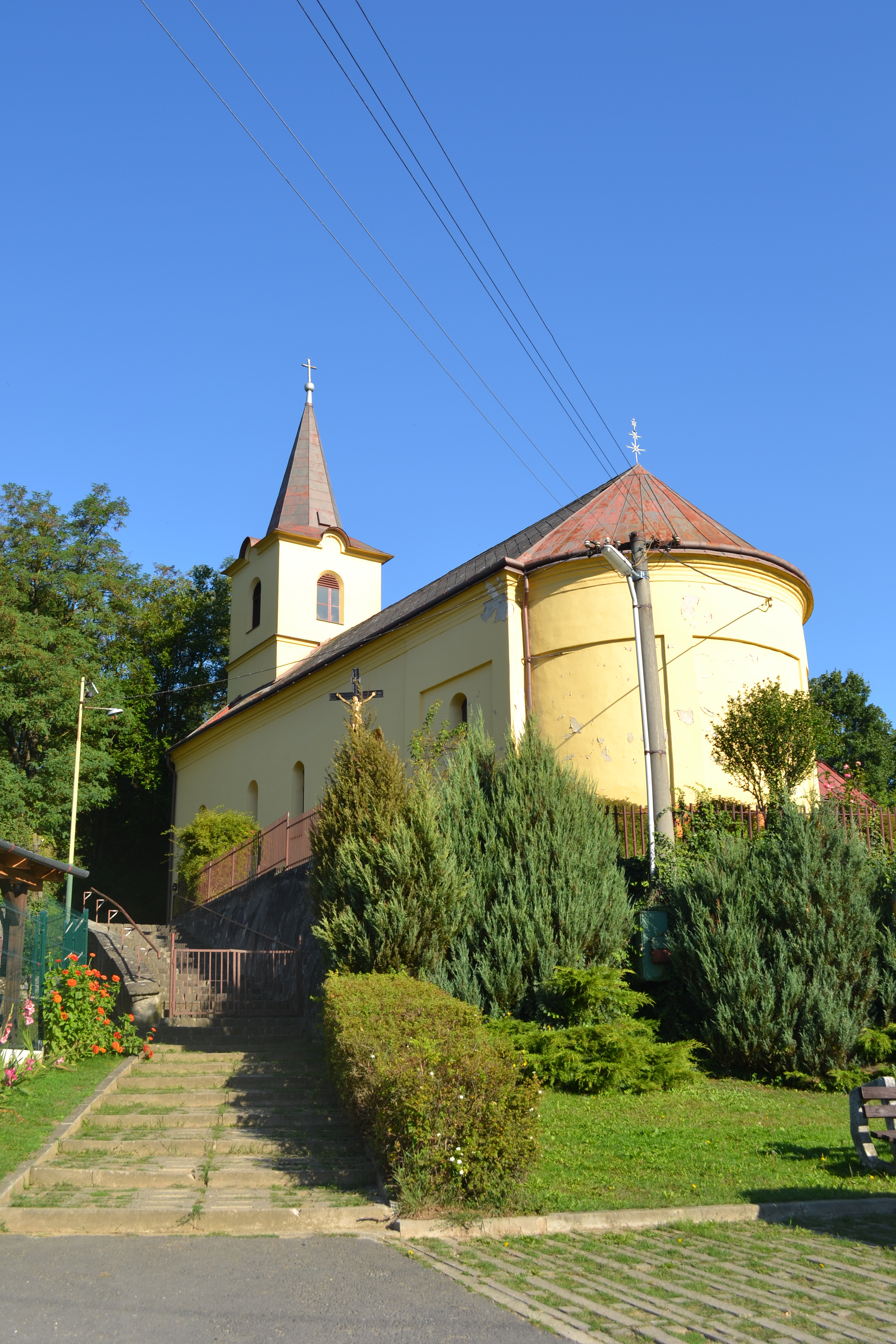
- Church of Saint Mary Magdalene

- Flag

- Location of Blhovce in the Banská Bystrica Region Location of Blhovce in Slovakia
- Coordinates: 48.27°N 19.97°E
- Country: Slovakia
- Region: Banská Bystrica Region
- District: Rimavská Sobota District
- First mentioned: 1240

Area
  - Total: 18.74 km^{2} (7.24 sq mi)
- Elevation: 205 m (673 ft)

Population (2025)
  - Total: 780
- Time zone: UTC+1 (CET)
  - Summer (DST): UTC+2 (CEST)
- Postal code: 980 32
- Area code: +421 47
- Vehicle registration plate (until 2022): RS
- Website: blhovce.sk

Blhovce (Hungarian: Balogfala, formerly: Balogfalva) is a village and municipality in the Rimavská Sobota District of the Banská Bystrica Region of southern Slovakia.

== Geography ==
The municipality lies at an altitude of 205 metres (673 ft) and covers an area of 18.74 km^{2} (7.24 sq mi) (2025).

== History ==
In historical records, the village was first mentioned in 1244 (1244 Bolug, 1427 Balogfalva) . In 1427 it belonged to the paladin Juraj of Ratold. In the 16th century it belong to Feledyi and Perényi families. During the 16th century it suffered because of Turks and during the 17th century due to the Polish-Lithuanian war. In the 18th century it passed to the Koháry family and to several zemans.

== Genealogical resources ==
The records for genealogical research are available at the state archive "Statny Archiv in Banska Bystrica, Slovakia"

- Roman Catholic church records (births/marriages/deaths): 1762-1897 (parish B)

== Population ==
Population statistic (10 years)
Year	1995	2005	2015	2025
Count	788	818	793	780
Difference		+3.80%	−3.05%	−1.63%

Population statistic
Year	2024	2025
Count	781	780
Difference		−0.12%

It has a population of 780 people (31 December 2025).

=== Ethnicity ===
Census 2021 (1+ %)
Ethnicity	Number	Fraction
Hungarian	608	77.94%
Romani	191	24.48%
Slovak	149	19.1%
Not found out	19	2.43%
Total	780	

In year 2021 was 780 people by ethnicity 608 as Hungarian, 191 as Romani, 149 as Slovak, 19 as Not found out, 2 as Czech and 1 as Turkish.

Note on population: The difference values of population numbers in the table "Population statistic" and in the sections "Ethnicity" & "Religion" is caused by the use of various statistical methods.

=== Religion ===
Census 2021 (1+ %)
Religion	Number	Fraction
Roman Catholic Church	595	76.28%
None	110	14.1%
Not found out	25	3.21%
Calvinist Church	16	2.05%
Evangelical Church	11	1.41%
Christian Congregations in Slovakia	9	1.15%
Total	780	

In year 2021 was 780 people by religion 595 from Roman Catholic Church, 110 from None, 25 from Not found out, 16 from Calvinist Church, 11 from Evangelical Church, 9 from Christian Congregations in Slovakia, 7 from Greek Catholic Church, 3 from Jehovah's Witnesses, 2 from Islam, 1 from United Methodist Church and 1 from Buddhism.

== See also ==
- List of municipalities and towns in Slovakia
