= Parvulin-like peptidyl-prolyl isomerase =

Functions as a molecular chaperone in Gram-positive bacteria

Parvulin-like peptidyl-prolyl isomerase (PrsA), also referred to as putative proteinase maturation protein A (PpmA), functions as a molecular chaperone in Gram-positive bacteria, such as B. subtilis, S. aureus, L. monocytogenes and S. pyogenes. PrsA proteins contain a highly conserved parvulin domain that contains peptidyl-prolyl cis-trans isomerase (PPIase) activity capable of catalyzing the bond N-terminal to proline from cis to trans, or vice versa, which is a rate limiting step in protein folding. PrsA homologs also contain a foldase domain suspected to aid in the folding of proteins but, unlike the parvulin domain, is not highly conserved. PrsA proteins are capable of forming multimers in vivo and in vitro and, when dimerized, form a claw-like structure linked by the NC domains. Most Gram-positive bacteria contain only one PrsA-like protein, but some organisms such as L. monocytogenes, B. anthracis and S. pyogenes contain two PrsAs.

== Function ==
In B. subtilis, PrsA is generally well characterized compared to PrsA homologs in other Gram-positive organisms. Secreteomic analyses have shown the absence of PrsA significantly impacts the yield of secreted proteins and that it is required for normal growth. In L. monocytogenes, there is a 5-6 log decrease in virulence when only one of two PrsA genes are deleted in a murine mouse model. Furthermore, PrsA-depleted bacterial cells have a decreased resistance to antibiotics, potentially due to its involvement in cell wall biogenesis, and thus PrsA may serve an antimicrobial target. Proteomic analysis of the Streptococcus pneumoniae secretome determined that PrsA is required for S. pneumoniae competence and virulence and also contributed to host cell adhesion and cell wall assembly of the bacterium.

There is evidence to support that parvulins, such as PrsA homologs, in Gram-positive bacteria function to fold and stabilize secreted proteins. Current data suggests that they are secreted from the cytoplasm to function in the interface between the cell wall and bacterial membrane. Here, they become tethered to the bacterial membrane via lipidation and mutation of the residue that lipidates PrsA to the bacterial membrane results in monomeric units, whereas when it is not mutated PrsA dimerizes and the dimer form is important for its function.

Virulence factors are primarily secreted out of the Sec translocation pathway in an unfolded state and must fully fold to function in pathogenesis. The role of PrsA proteins have been implicated in aiding in protein folding of those unfolded secreted proteins to promote virulence. Additionally, PrsA function has been implicated in full biofilm formation, swimming motility, stress resistance as well as other biological processes.
