= Čakanovce, Košice-okolie District =

Municipality of Slovakia

Čakanovce Ósvacsákány
- Municipality
- Flag

- Location of Čakanovce in the Košice Region Location of Čakanovce in Slovakia
- Coordinates: 48.77°N 21.43°E
- Country: Slovakia
- Region: Košice Region
- District: Košice-okolie District
- First mentioned: 1439

Area
  - Total: 9.61 km^{2} (3.71 sq mi)
- Elevation: 271 m (889 ft)

Population (2025)
  - Total: 768
- Time zone: UTC+1 (CET)
  - Summer (DST): UTC+2 (CEST)
- Postal code: 444 5
- Area code: +421 55
- Vehicle registration plate (until 2022): KS
- Website: www.cakanovce.eu

Čakanovce (Hungarian: Ósvacsákány) is a village and municipality in Košice-okolie District in the Košice Region of eastern Slovakia.

== History ==
In historical records, the village was first mentioned in 1439.

== Geography ==
The municipality lies at an altitude of 271 metres (889 ft) and covers an area of 9.61 km^{2} (3.71 sq mi) (2025).

== Population ==
Population statistic (10 years)
Year	1995	2005	2015	2025
Count	467	556	667	768
Difference		+19.05%	+19.96%	+15.14%

Population statistic
Year	2024	2025
Count	761	768
Difference		+0.91%

It has a population of 768 people (31 December 2025).

=== Ethnicity ===
Census 2021 (1+ %)
Ethnicity	Number	Fraction
Slovak	644	93.6%
Romani	175	25.43%
Not found out	123	17.87%
Total	688	

In year 2021 was 688 people by ethnicity 644 as Slovak, 175 as Romani, 123 as Not found out, 5 as Czech, 3 as Rusyn, 3 as Hungarian and 3 as Other.

Note on population: The difference values of population numbers in the table "Population statistic" and in the sections "Ethnicity" & "Religion" is caused by the use of various statistical methods.

=== Religion ===
Census 2021 (1+ %)
Religion	Number	Fraction
Roman Catholic Church	317	46.08%
Evangelical Church	158	22.97%
None	117	17.01%
Greek Catholic Church	41	5.96%
Calvinist Church	37	5.38%
Not found out	12	1.74%
Total	688	

In year 2021 was 688 people by religion 317 from Roman Catholic Church, 158 from Evangelical Church, 117 from None, 41 from Greek Catholic Church, 37 from Calvinist Church, 12 from Not found out, 3 from Seventh-day Adventist Church, 1 from Eastern Orthodox Church, 1 from Islam and 1 from Other.

== Notable people ==
One of the Thirteen Martyrs of Arad, Arisztid Dessewffy was born here.

== Genealogical resources ==
The records for genealogical research are available at the state archive "Statny Archiv in Kosice, Slovakia"

- Roman Catholic church records (births/marriages/deaths): 1755-1895 (parish B)
- Greek Catholic church records (births/marriages/deaths): 1788-1912 (parish B)
- Lutheran church records (births/marriages/deaths): 1775-1895 (parish B)

== See also ==
- List of municipalities and towns in Slovakia
