= Čakanovce, Lučenec District =

Čakanovce Csákányháza
- Municipality
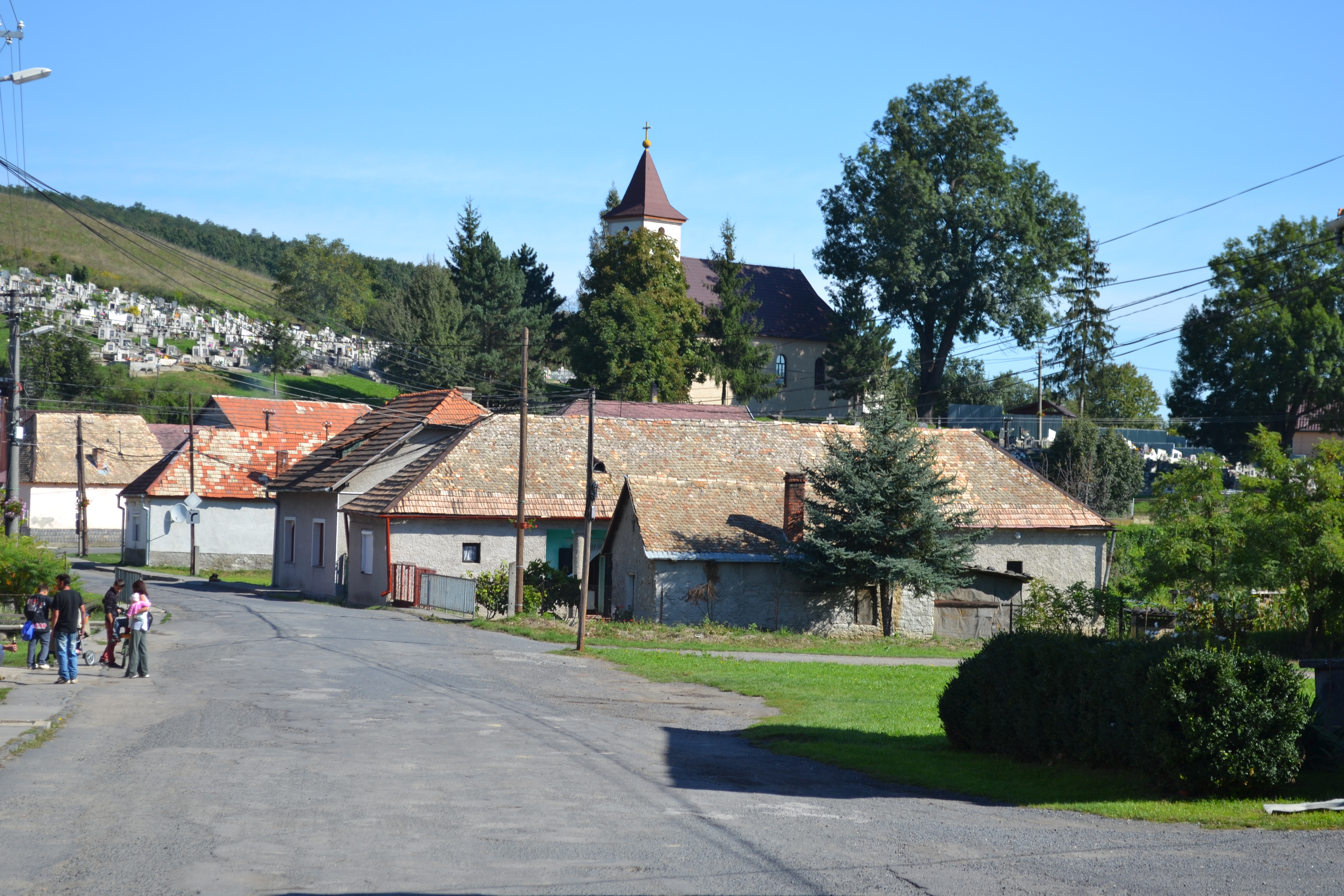

- Flag

- Location of Čakanovce in the Banská Bystrica Region Location of Čakanovce in Slovakia
- Coordinates: 48°12′48″N 19°48′49″E
- Country: Slovakia
- Region: Banská Bystrica Region
- District: Lučenec District
- First mentioned: 1439

Area
  - Total: 12.42 km^{2} (4.80 sq mi)
- Elevation: 243 m (797 ft)

Population (2025)
  - Total: 1,137
- Time zone: UTC+1 (CET)
  - Summer (DST): UTC+2 (CEST)
- Postal code: 985 58
- Area code: +421 47
- Vehicle registration plate (until 2022): LC
- Website: www.obeccakanovce.sk

Čakanovce (before 1927 Čakanová; Hungarian: Csákányháza) is a village and municipality in the Lučenec District in the Banská Bystrica Region of Slovakia.

== History ==
The village arose in the 13th or 14th century. It was first mentioned in 1439 (Chakanhaza). It changed many owners during the history. From 1554 to 1594 it was occupied by the Turks. It suffered war devastations very much in the 17th century. From 1938 to 1944 it belonged to Hungary under the First Vienna Award.

== Population ==
Population statistic (10 years)
Year	1995	2005	2015	2025
Count	914	973	1166	1137
Difference		+6.45%	+19.83%	−2.48%

Population statistic
Year	2024	2025
Count	1143	1137
Difference		−0.52%

It has a population of 1137 people (31 December 2025).

=== Ethnicity ===
Census 2021 (1+ %)
Ethnicity	Number	Fraction
Hungarian	872	77.44%
Romani	378	33.57%
Slovak	172	15.27%
Not found out	36	3.19%
Total	1126	

In year 2021 was 1126 people by ethnicity 872 as Hungarian, 378 as Romani, 172 as Slovak, 36 as Not found out, 7 as Czech, 2 as Polish, 2 as Other and 1 as Irish.

Note on population: The difference values of population numbers in the table "Population statistic" and in the sections "Ethnicity" & "Religion" is caused by the use of various statistical methods.

=== Religion ===
Census 2021 (1+ %)
Religion	Number	Fraction
Roman Catholic Church	1009	89.61%
None	88	7.82%
Not found out	12	1.07%
Total	1126	

In year 2021 was 1126 people by religion 1009 from Roman Catholic Church, 88 from None, 12 from Not found out, 6 from Evangelical Church, 5 from Christian Congregations in Slovakia, 3 from Calvinist Church and 3 from Jehovah's Witnesses.

== Genealogical resources ==
The records for genealogical research are available at the state archive "Statny Archiv in Banska Bystrica, Slovakia"

- Roman Catholic church records (births/marriages/deaths): 1785-1897 (parish B)
- Lutheran church records (births/marriages/deaths): 1783-1895 (parish B)

== See also ==
- List of municipalities and towns in Slovakia
