= Dubno, Rimavská Sobota District =

Village and municipality in Slovakia

Dubno Dobfenek
- Municipality
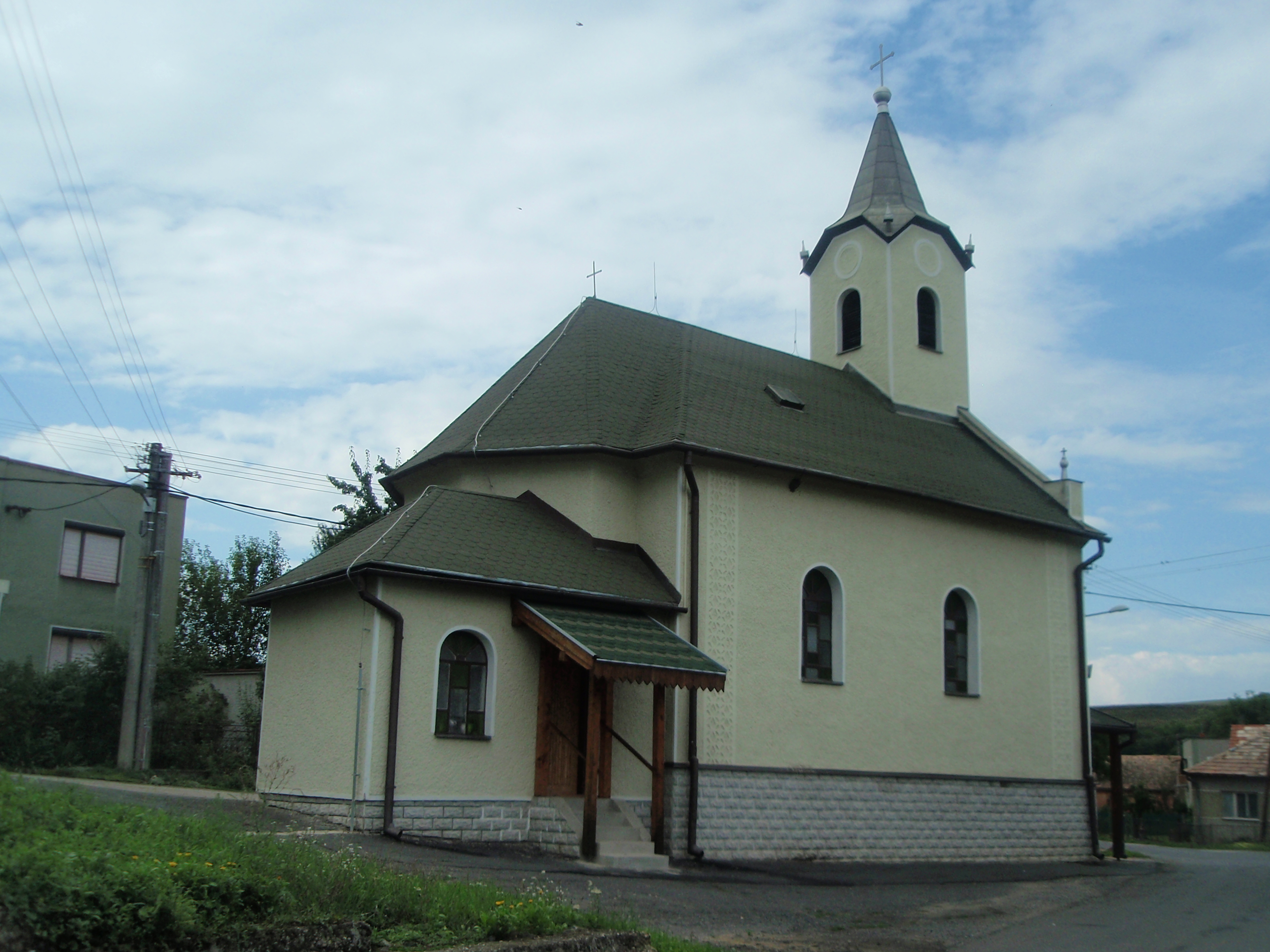

- Flag

- Location of Dubno in the Banská Bystrica Region Location of Dubno in Slovakia
- Coordinates: 48°12′N 20°00′E
- Country: Slovakia
- Region: Banská Bystrica Region
- District: Rimavská Sobota District
- First mentioned: 1427

Area
  - Total: 3.61 km^{2} (1.39 sq mi)
- Elevation: 238 m (781 ft)

Population (2025)
  - Total: 140
- Time zone: UTC+1 (CET)
  - Summer (DST): UTC+2 (CEST)
- Postal code: 980 35
- Area code: +421 47
- Vehicle registration plate (until 2022): RS
- Website: www.obecdubno.sk

Dubno (Hungarian: Dobfenek) is a village and municipality in the Rimavská Sobota District of the Banská Bystrica Region of southern Slovakia.

== History ==
In historical records, the village was first mentioned in 1427 Tamas Recsky's (a noble) property.

== Genealogical resources ==
The records for genealogical research are available at the state archive "Statny Archiv in Banska Bystrica, Slovakia"

- Roman Catholic church records (births/marriages/deaths): 1812-1897 (parish B)
- Reformated church records (births/marriages/deaths): 1769-1858 (parish B)

== Population ==
Population statistic (10 years)
Year	1995	2005	2015	2025
Count	162	137	170	140
Difference		−15.43%	+24.08%	−17.64%

Population statistic
Year	2024	2025
Count	140	140
Difference		+0%

It has a population of 140 people (31 December 2025).

=== Ethnicity ===
Census 2021 (1+ %)
Ethnicity	Number	Fraction
Hungarian	123	82%
Slovak	24	16%
Not found out	5	3.33%
Total	150	

In year 2021 was 150 people by ethnicity 123 as Hungarian, 24 as Slovak, 5 as Not found out and 1 as Ukrainian.

Note on population: The difference values of population numbers in the table "Population statistic" and in the sections "Ethnicity" & "Religion" is caused by the use of various statistical methods.

=== Religion ===
Census 2021 (1+ %)
Religion	Number	Fraction
Roman Catholic Church	126	84%
None	12	8%
Not found out	5	3.33%
Greek Catholic Church	3	2%
Calvinist Church	2	1.33%
Evangelical Church	2	1.33%
Total	150	

In year 2021 was 150 people by religion 126 from Roman Catholic Church, 12 from None, 5 from Not found out, 3 from Greek Catholic Church, 2 from Calvinist Church and 2 from Evangelical Church.

== See also ==
- List of municipalities and towns in Slovakia
