= Pleš, Slovakia =

Pleš Fülekpilis
- Municipality
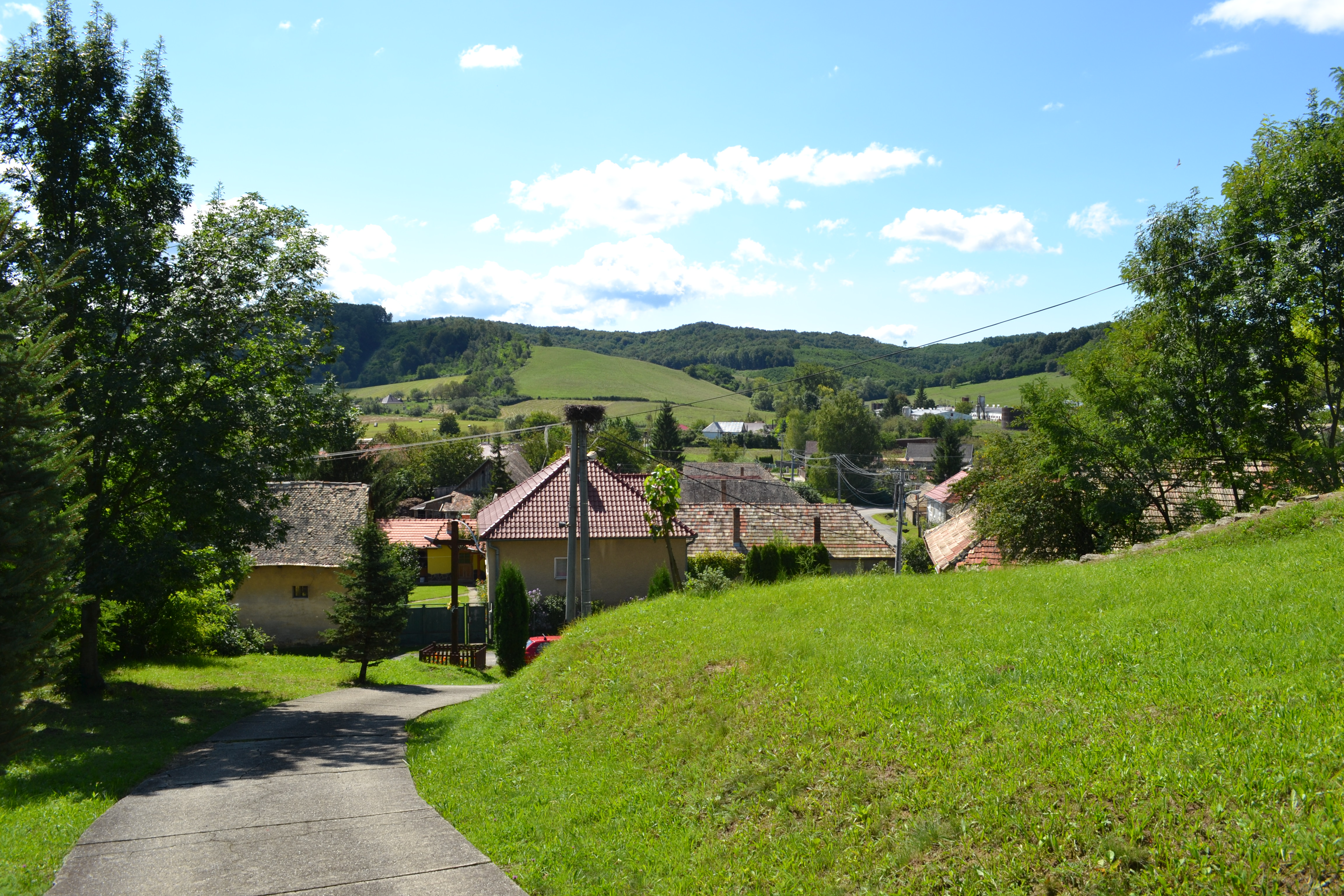

- Location of Pleš in the Banská Bystrica Region Location of Pleš in Slovakia
- Coordinates: 48°14′N 19°45′E
- Country: Slovakia
- Region: Banská Bystrica Region
- District: Lučenec District
- First mentioned: 1246

Area
  - Total: 9.78 km^{2} (3.78 sq mi)
- Elevation: 223 m (732 ft)

Population (2025)
  - Total: 178
- Time zone: UTC+1 (CET)
  - Summer (DST): UTC+2 (CEST)
- Postal code: 985 31
- Area code: +421 47
- Vehicle registration plate (until 2022): LC
- Website: www.obecples.sk

Pleš (Hungarian: Fülekpilis) is a village and municipality in the Lučenec District in the Banská Bystrica Region of Slovakia.

== Geography ==
The municipality lies at an altitude of 223 metres (732 ft) and covers an area of 9.78 km^{2} (3.78 sq mi) (2025).

== Population ==
Population statistic (10 years)
Year	1995	2005	2015	2025
Count	226	249	220	178
Difference		+10.17%	−11.64%	−19.09%

Population statistic
Year	2024	2025
Count	185	178
Difference		−3.78%

It has a population of 178 people (31 December 2025).

=== Ethnicity ===
Census 2021 (1+ %)
Ethnicity	Number	Fraction
Slovak	131	68.58%
Hungarian	54	28.27%
Not found out	6	3.14%
Romani	3	1.57%
Other	2	1.04%
Total	191	

In year 2021 was 191 people by ethnicity 131 as Slovak, 54 as Hungarian, 6 as Not found out, 3 as Romani, 2 as Other and 1 as Rusyn.

Note on population: The difference values of population numbers in the table "Population statistic" and in the sections "Ethnicity" & "Religion" is caused by the use of various statistical methods.

=== Religion ===
Census 2021 (1+ %)
Religion	Number	Fraction
Roman Catholic Church	156	81.68%
None	19	9.95%
Not found out	6	3.14%
Evangelical Church	3	1.57%
Seventh-day Adventist Church	3	1.57%
Total	191	

In year 2021 was 191 people by religion 156 from Roman Catholic Church, 19 from None, 6 from Not found out, 3 from Evangelical Church, 3 from Seventh-day Adventist Church, 1 from Paganism and natural spirituality, 1 from Christian Congregations in Slovakia, 1 from Islam and 1 from Ad hoc movements.
