= Pál Csernai =

Hungarian football player and manager

Personal information
- Date of birth: 21 October 1932
- Place of birth: Pilis, Kingdom of Hungary
- Date of death: 1 September 2013 (aged 80)
- Position: Midfielder

Senior career*
Years	Team	Apps	(Gls)
1952–1953	Budapesti Postás	46	(2)
1954–1955	Csepeli Vasas	46	(0)
1956–1958	Karlsruher SC		
1958–1959	La Chaux-de-Fonds		
1959–1965	Stuttgarter Kickers		

International career
1955	Hungary	2	(0)

Managerial career
- 1968–1970: Wacker 04 Berlin
- 1970–1971: SSV Reutlingen 05
- 1971–1972: Royal Antwerp
- 1973–1977: North Baden FA
- 1978–1983: Bayern Munich
- 1983–1984: PAOK
- 1984–1985: Benfica
- 1985–1986: Borussia Dortmund
- 1987–1988: Fenerbahçe
- 1988: Eintracht Frankfurt
- 1990: Young Boys
- 1990–1991: Hertha BSC
- 1993: North Korea
- 1994–1995: Sopron
- * Club domestic league appearances and goals

Pál Csernai (21 October 1932 – 1 September 2013) was a Hungarian football player and manager.

== Career ==
=== Playing career ===
Born in Pilis, Kingdom of Hungary, Csernai played club football in Hungary, Germany and Switzerland for Budapesti Postás, Csepeli Vasas, Karlsruher SC, La Chaux-de-Fonds and Stuttgarter Kickers.

He earned two caps for Hungary in 1955, before his defection that same year.

=== Management career ===
After retiring as a player, Csernai managed clubs in Germany, Belgium, Greece, Portugal, Turkey, Switzerland and Hungary. He finished runner-up in the 1982 European Cup final with Bayern Munich.

In the early 1990s, he was involved with the North Korean national team. In June 1991, he signed a six-month contract with the PRKFA, acting as a technical adviser to manager Hong Hyon-chol. During this time, North Korea beat the United States 2–1 in a friendly match. After Hong's sacking in October 1993, the PRKFA turned to Csernai to become the national team's manager. The team left for Qatar to participate in the final round of the Asian qualifiers for the 1994 FIFA World Cup. They started positively, with a 3–2 win over Iraq, but lost the other four matches, with the final one being a 3–0 loss to rivals South Korea. Despite the North Korean authorities' insistence for him to stay on as manager, Csernai returned to Hungary, concerned over their efforts to have him acquire citizenship.

Known for wearing his trade mark silk scarf, he is considered to be the inventor of the so-called "Pal system", a combination of the man-to-man and the zone defenses.

== Later life and death ==
Csernai died on 1 September 2013, after a long illness.
