= Prša =

- Municipality
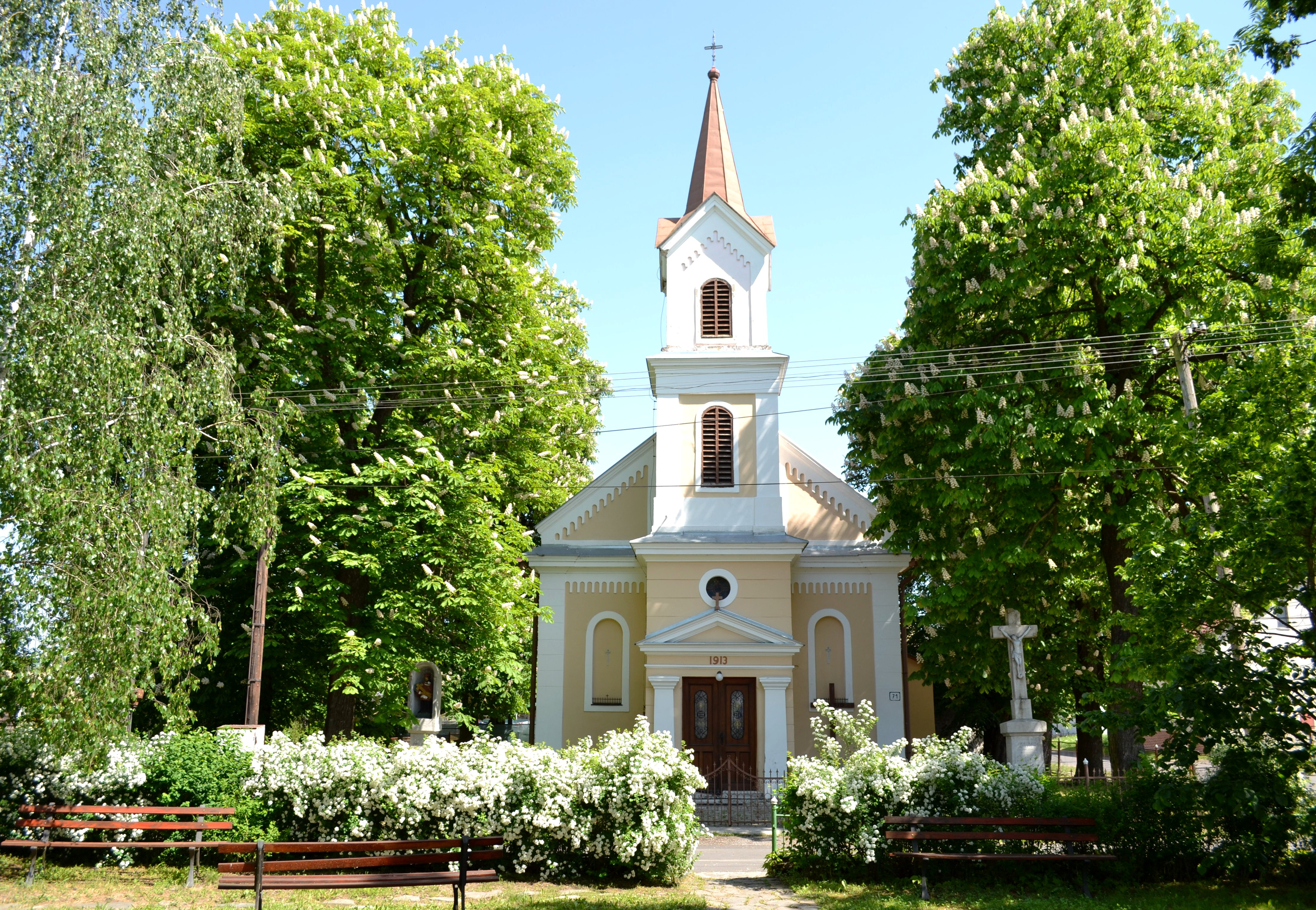
- Church of Rosary of Our Lady

- Flag

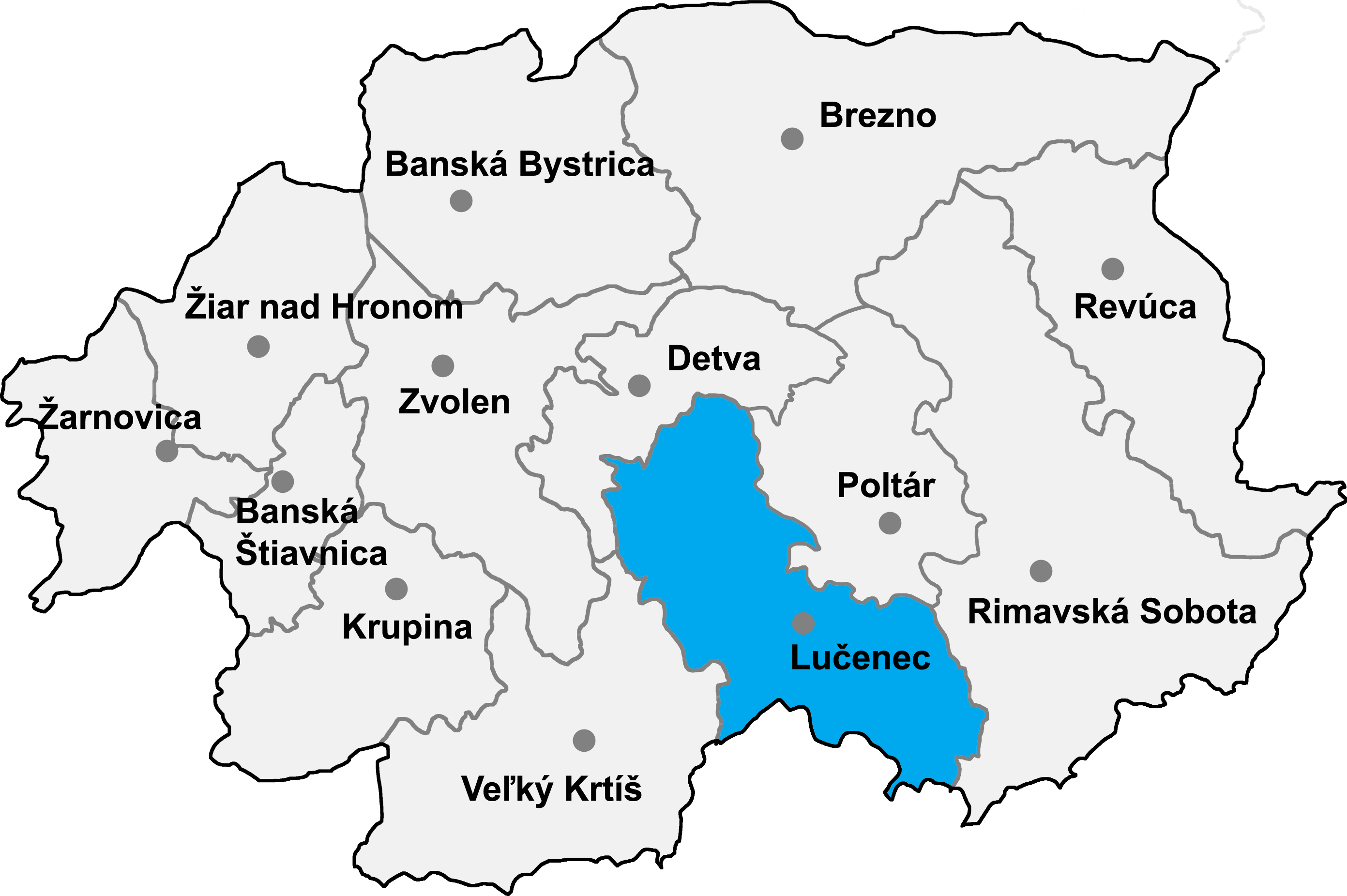

- Location of Prša in Slovakia. Prša (Banská Bystrica Region)
- Coordinates: 48°18′N 19°48′E
- Country: Slovakia
- Region: Banská Bystrica Region
- District: Lučenec District

Government
  - Mayor: Gábor Nagy (Ind.)

Area
  - Total: 3.49 km^{2} (1.35 sq mi)

Population (2025)
  - Total: 184
- Time zone: UTC+1 (CET)
  - Summer (DST): UTC+2 (CEST)
- Postal code: 985 41
- Area code: +421-47
- Website: www.obecprsa.sk

Prša (Hungarian: Perse) is a village and municipality in the Lučenec District in the Banská Bystrica Region of Slovakia.

== Population ==
Population statistic (10 years)
Year	1995	2005	2015	2025
Count	204	183	202	184
Difference		−10.29%	+10.38%	−8.91%

Population statistic
Year	2024	2025
Count	182	184
Difference		+1.09%

It has a population of 184 people (31 December 2025).

=== Ethnicity ===
Census 2021 (1+ %)
Ethnicity	Number	Fraction
Hungarian	152	80%
Slovak	40	21.05%
Not found out	4	2.1%
Czech	2	1.05%
Romani	2	1.05%
Total	190	

In year 2021 was 190 people by ethnicity 152 as Hungarian, 40 as Slovak, 4 as Not found out, 2 as Czech and 2 as Romani.

Note on population: The difference values of population numbers in the table "Population statistic" and in the sections "Ethnicity" & "Religion" is caused by the use of various statistical methods.

=== Religion ===
Census 2021 (1+ %)
Religion	Number	Fraction
Roman Catholic Church	157	82.63%
None	21	11.05%
Evangelical Church	5	2.63%
Not found out	3	1.58%
Greek Catholic Church	2	1.05%
Total	190	

In year 2021 was 190 people by religion 157 from Roman Catholic Church, 21 from None, 5 from Evangelical Church, 3 from Not found out, 2 from Greek Catholic Church, 1 from Other and not ascertained christian church and 1 from Jehovah's Witnesses.
