= Tyros (nymph) =

Nymph in Greek mythology

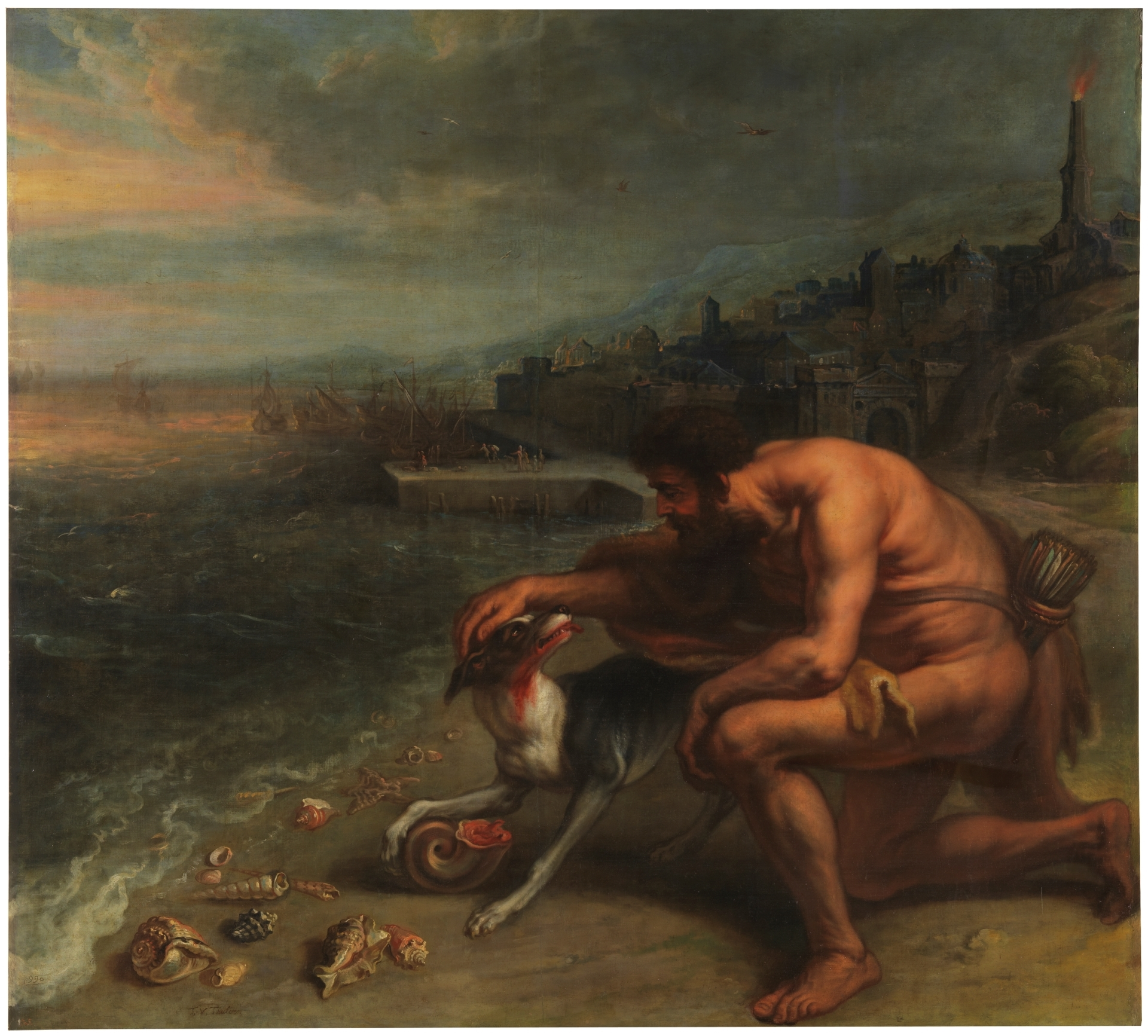
Hercules' Dog Discovers Purple Dye by Theodoor van Thulden, c. 1636.

In Greek mythology, Tyros (Ancient Greek: Τύρος, romanized: Túros), also romanised Tyrus, is a Phoenician nymph and the civic personification of the ancient city of Tyre, in modern Lebanon. In the myth, Tyros becomes a lover of the Theban hero Heracles and is associated with the creation of tyrian purple, the rare and expensive dye Tyre was renowned for in antiquity, after she asked Heracles to gift her a gown dyed in that colour. Tyros is known through the works of late antiquity and medieval authors.

== Etymology ==
Tyros got her name from Τύρος, the Greek exonym of the Phoenician city, which in the Phoenician language was called 𐤑𐤓 (Ṣūr).

== Mythology ==
According to the legend, Tyros was a Phoenician nymph dwelling by the Levantine shore near Tyre. Her exact parentage is not known, but she came to be courted by the divine hero Heracles, the son of Zeus and Alcmene.

One day Heracles brought his dog along on his way to meet her, as was custom. The dog got hungry, and attacked a sea creature protruding from a shell on the beach, and ate it. The blood and flesh of the murex snail stained the dog’s mouth red and purple. Heracles and the dog then continued their way to meet the nymph.

When Heracles finally reached Tyros, she took a look at the dog’s reddish purple snout, and was thrilled by the brilliance and vibrancy of the magnificent colour. She declared to Heracles that she would not have him unless he brought her a gown dyed with that same colour. Heracles then tracked down the sea snails, extracted the pigment, and gave Tyros a splendid purple gown as a gift. Thereafter, he was forever honoured as the inventor of the tyrian purple dye.

In an alternative account of the legend, Heracles brought the dye to King Phoenix of Tyre, who then decreed that no man bar the king himself was allowed to wear such virtuous clothing worthy only of royalty.

== Significance ==
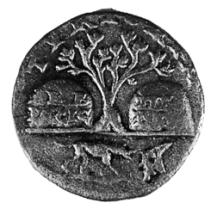
A Phoenician coin depicting the legend of the dog biting the sea snail.

In antiquity, the city of Tyre was famous for its industrial production of tyrian purple, an extremely rare and expensive dye; tyrian purple was renowned for its unique beauty and lightfast qualities. It was particularly cherished because the colour did not fade easily, but in fact became even brighter with weathering and sunlight. Thousands of Murex trunculus and Murex brandaris shellfish were needed to produce one gram of the dye.

The rare colour was reserved for the use of royalty and nobility only, as exhibited in the version with king Phoenix. By the fourth century AD, only the Roman emperors were permitted to wear Tyrian purple, and its production was strictly controlled in the succeeding Eastern Roman Empire, where a child born to a reigning emperor was dubbed porphyrogenitus, literally translating to "born in the purple".

== See also ==
- Dragon's blood
- Byzantine silk
- Milk of Hera
- Melqart, a Phoenician god identified as "Tyrian Hercules" by writers such as Heliodorus of Emesa and Herodotus

== Bibliography ==
- Jidejian, Nina (2018). TYRE Through The Ages (3rd ed.). Beirut: Librairie Orientale. ISBN 9789953171050.
- John Malalas, Chronography, Books 1-7 and 10-18, with a high-speed, pseudo-literal translation by Brady Kiesling, 2019. Text available online on Topos Text.
- Julius Pollux, Onomasticon, volume 1 edited by Wilhelm Dindorf, Leipzig: 1824. Online text at Internet Archive.
- La Boda, Sharon (1994). International Dictionary of Historic Places: Middle East and Africa. Vol. 4. Chicago and London: Fitzroy Dearborn. ISBN 1-884964-03-6.
- Liddell, Henry George; Scott, Robert (1940). A Greek-English Lexicon, revised and augmented throughout by Sir Henry Stuart Jones with the assistance of Roderick McKenzie. Oxford: Clarendon Press. Online version at Perseus.tufts project.
- Nonnus, Dionysiaca; translated by Rouse, W H D, III Books XXXVI-XLVIII. Loeb Classical Library No. 346, Cambridge, Massachusetts, Harvard University Press; London, William Heinemann Ltd. 1940. Internet Archive.
- St. Clair, Kassia (2016). The Secret Lives of Colour. London: John Murray. ISBN 9781473630819. OCLC 936144129.
- St. John, James Augustus (1842). The History of the Manners and Customs of Ancient Greece. Vol. III. London: Richard Bentley.
- Woodhouse, Sidney Chawner (1910). English–Greek Dictionary: A Vocabulary of the Attic Language. London: Routledge & Kegan Paul Limited.
- Silver, Larry (2017). Rubens, Velázquez, and the King of Spain. Routledge. ISBN 9781351550390.
