= Hercules's Dog Discovers Purple Dye =

1636 painting by Peter Paul Rubens

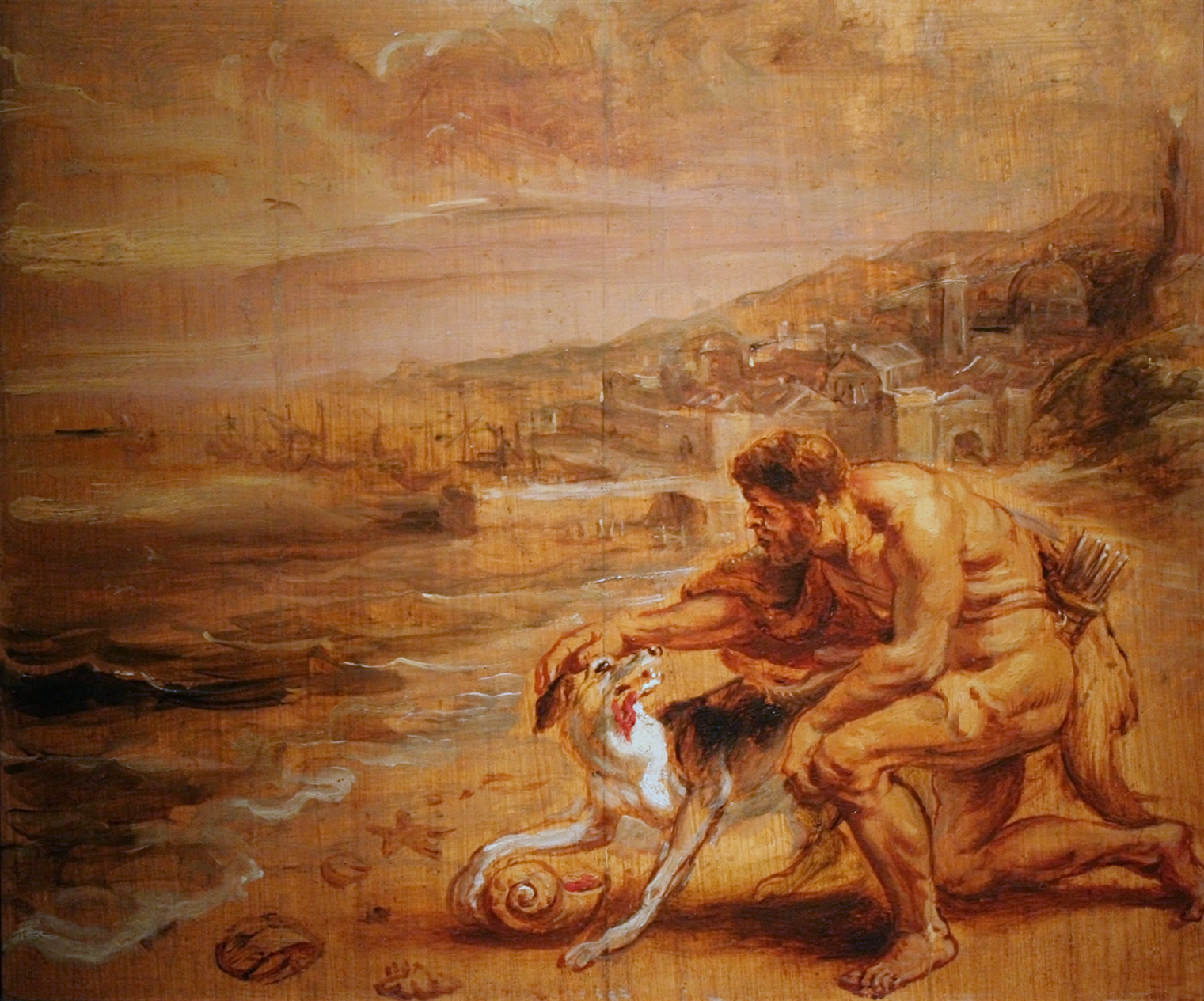
Hercules's Dog Discovers Purple Dye, by Peter Paul Rubens. 28 × 34 cm; oil on panel. Musée Bonnat, Bayonne, France

Hercules's Dog Discovers Purple Dye or The Discovery of Purple by Hercules's Dog is an oil painting by Flemish artist Peter Paul Rubens painted circa 1636, towards the end of his career. It depicts the mythical discovery of Tyrian purple by Hercules and his dog, and was one of dozens of oil on panel sketches made by Rubens for the decoration of the Torre de la Parada in Spain. A completed painting based on Rubens's sketch was made by Theodoor van Thulden in 1636–1638, and is now held at the Museum of Fine Arts in A Coruña, Spain.

== Description ==
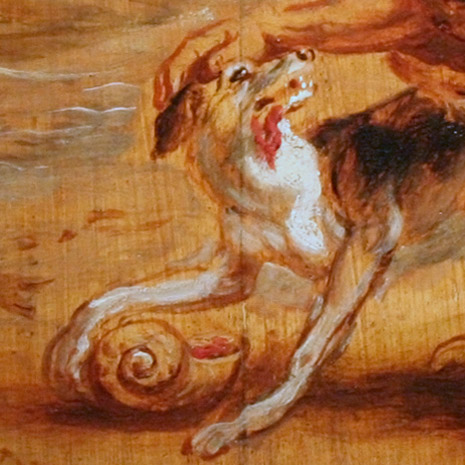
Detail showing the dog with what appears to be a nautilus rather than a dye murex

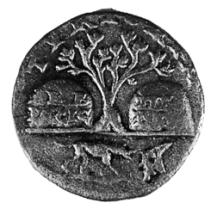
A Phoenician coin depicting the legend of the dog biting the sea snail

The painting shows a scene from an origin myth in the Onomasticon (a collection of names, similar to a thesaurus) of Julius Pollux, a 2nd-century Graeco-Roman sophist. In Pollux's story, Hercules and his dog were walking on the beach on their way to court a nymph named Tyros. The dog bit a sea snail (πορφύρα/porphúra), and the snail's blood dyed the dog's mouth Tyrian purple. Seeing this, the nymph demanded a gown of the same color, and the result was the origin of purple dye. (Some attribute the myth to Melqart, a Tyrian deity identified with Heracles.)

Rubens's painting of this story depicts Hercules and the dog on the beach, with the dog's mouth stained. Although the snail in the story should be a spiny murex, the kind of snail from which Tyrian purple was made, Rubens instead depicts a large smooth shell that resembles a nautilus.

== Context ==
Rubens's painting was originally part of a cycle of paintings of Hercules, which Rubens painted for the Habsburg rulers of Spain as sketch for a painting intended to decorate their Torre de la Parada, a hunting lodge. The paintings of the cycle contain allegorical references to the Habsburgs and the wealth they had obtained from the conquest of Peru.

The "royal purple" whose origin story this particular painting depicts was used to clothe emperors, and by the time of Rubens it had become a standard aspect of the depiction of royalty and divinity. By showing a scene of Hercules's travels to Phoenicia, the painting also refers to a traditional warning, attributed to the Phoenicians, to stay within the bounds of the Pillars of Hercules, and to the Habsburgs' own passage beyond that limit.

== Location and related works ==
Rubens's sketch painting is in the Musée Bonnat in Bayonne and is one of several works on Herculean subjects there. Others include a drawing of Hercules killing the Lernaean Hydra by Italian Renaissance painter Piero di Cosimo and a painting of Hercules killing Diomedes (c.1639–1641) by Charles Le Brun.

Giorgio Vasari also painted the same subject, with a similar subtext referring to the wealth of his patron Francesco I de' Medici, Grand Duke of Tuscany; his version is in Studiolo of Francesco I of the Palazzo Vecchio in Florence.

An oil painting based on Rubens's sketch by Theodoor van Thulden is in the Prado Museum.
