= Tyrian purple =

Natural dye extracted from Murex sea snails

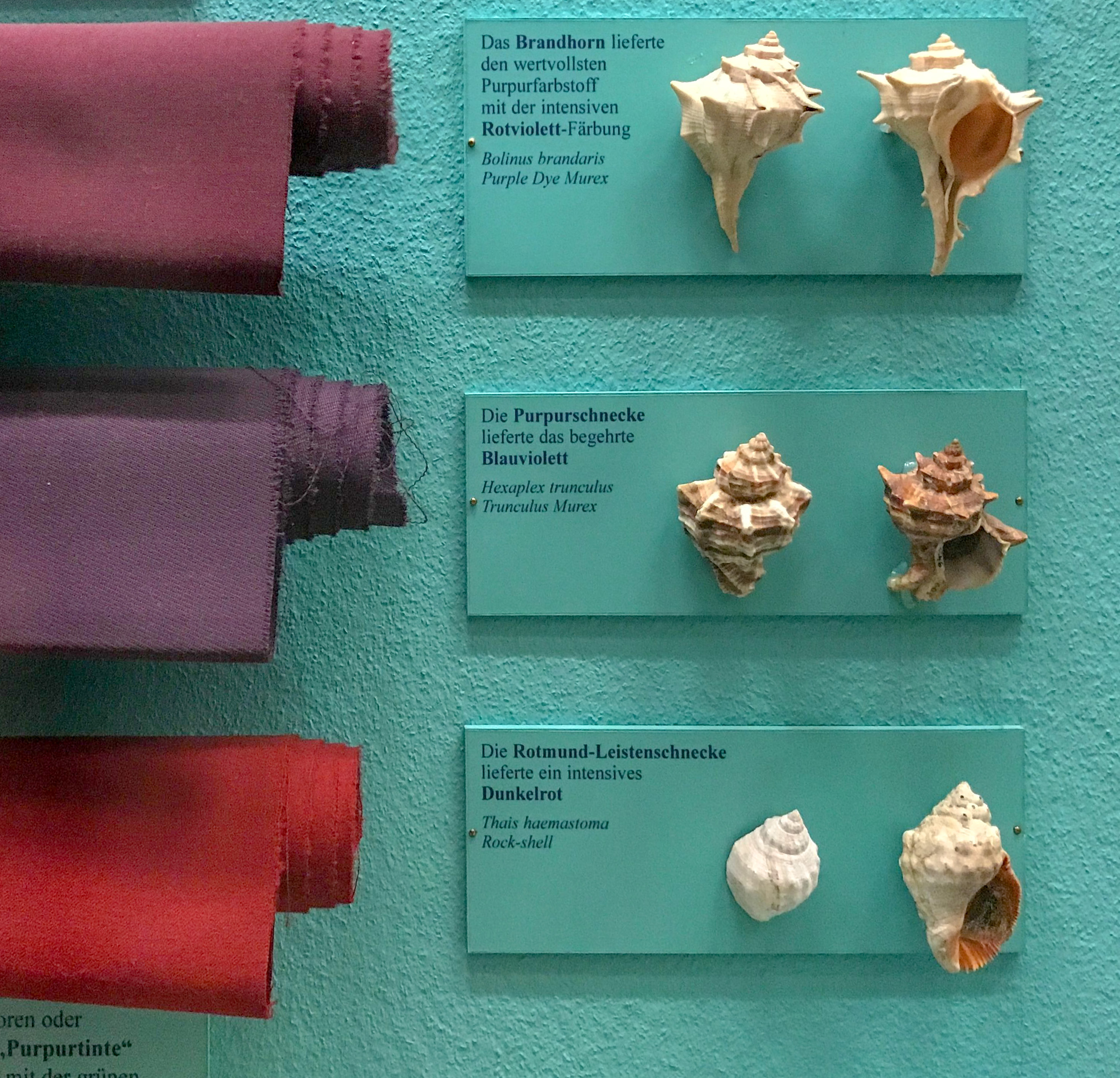
Fabrics dyed in the current era from different species of sea snail. The colours in this photograph may not represent them accurately.

Tyrian purple (Ancient Greek: πορφύρα porphúra; Latin: purpura), also known as royal purple, imperial purple, imperial dye, or simply tyrian, is a reddish-purple natural dye. It is secreted by several species of predatory sea snails in the family Muricidae, rock snails originally known by the name murex (Bolinus brandaris, Hexaplex trunculus and Stramonita haemastoma). The coloured compound is 6,6'-dibromoindigo.

The name Tyrian refers to the city of Tyre in ancient Phoenicia (modern-day Lebanon). In ancient times, extracting this dye involved tens of thousands of snails and substantial labour, and as a result the dye was costly to use and conferred a high social value on those whose clothing bore its color.

== History ==
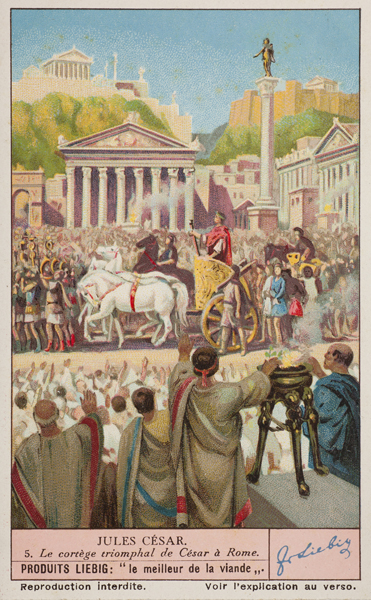
A 20th-century depiction of a Roman triumph celebrated by Julius Caesar. Caesar, riding in the chariot, wears the solid Tyrian purple toga picta. In the foreground, two Roman magistrates are identified by their toga praetexta, white with a stripe of Tyrian purple.

Biological pigments were often difficult to acquire, and the details of their production were kept secret by the manufacturers. Tyrian purple is a pigment made from the mucus of several species of murex snail. Production of Tyrian purple for use as a fabric dye began as early as 1200 BC by the Phoenicians, and was continued by the Greeks and Romans until 1453 AD, with the fall of Constantinople. In the same way as the modern-day Latin alphabet of Phoenician origin, Phoenician purple pigment was spread through the unique Phoenician trading empire. The pigment was expensive and time-consuming to produce, and items coloured with it became associated with power and wealth. This popular idea of purple being elite contributes to the modern day widespread belief that purple is a "royal colour". The colour of textiles from this period provides insight into socio-cultural relationships within ancient societies, in addition to providing insights on technological achievements, fashion, social stratification, agriculture and trade connections. Despite their value to archaeological research, textiles are quite rare in the archaeological record. Like any perishable organic material, they are usually subject to rapid decomposition and their preservation over millennia requires exacting conditions to prevent destruction by microorganisms.

Tyrian purple may first have been used by the ancient Phoenicians as early as 1570 BC. It has been suggested that the name Phoenicia itself means 'land of purple'. The dye was greatly prized in antiquity because the colour did not easily fade, but instead became brighter with weathering and sunlight. It came in various shades, the most prized being that of black-tinted clotted blood.

Because it was extremely tedious to make, Tyrian purple was expensive: the 4th century BC historian Theopompus reported, "Purple for dyes fetched its weight in silver at Colophon" in Asia Minor. The expense meant that purple-dyed textiles became status symbols, whose use was restricted by sumptuary laws. The most senior Roman magistrates wore a toga praetexta, a white toga edged in Tyrian purple. The even more sumptuous toga picta, solid Tyrian purple with gold thread edging, was worn by generals celebrating a Roman triumph.

By the fourth century AD, sumptuary laws in Rome had been tightened so much that only the Roman emperor was permitted to wear Tyrian purple. As a result, 'purple' is sometimes used as a metonym for the office (e.g. the phrase 'donned the purple' means 'became emperor'). The production of Tyrian purple was tightly controlled in the succeeding Byzantine Empire and subsidized by the imperial court, which restricted its use for the colouring of imperial silks. Later (9th century), a child born to a reigning emperor was said to be porphyrogenitos, "born in the purple".

Some speculate that the dye extracted from the Bolinus brandaris is known as argaman (ארגמן) in Biblical Hebrew. Another dye extracted from a related sea snail, Hexaplex trunculus, produced a blue colour after light exposure which could be the one known as tekhelet (תְּכֵלֶת), used in garments worn for ritual purposes.

== Production from sea snails ==
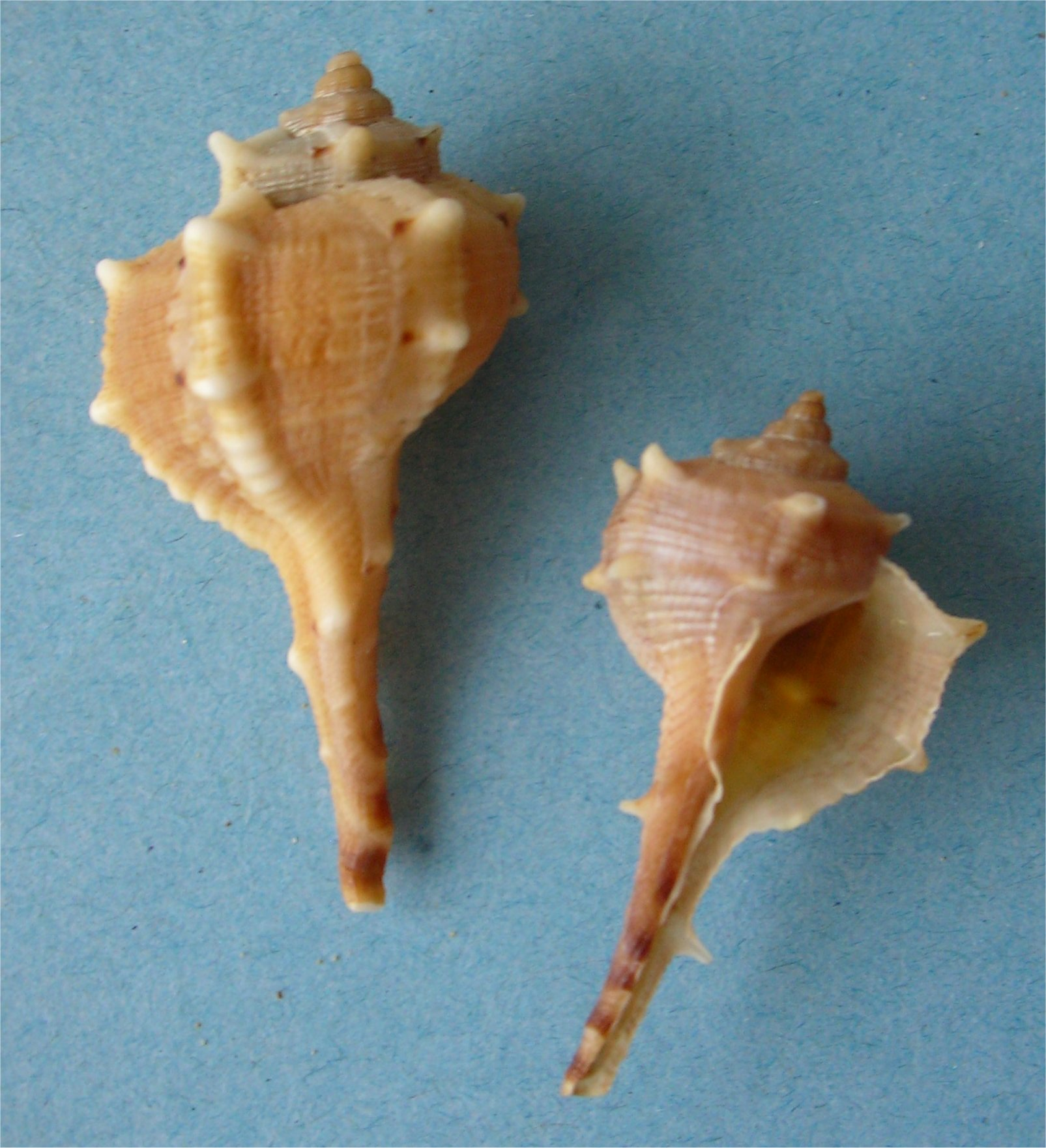
Two shells of Bolinus brandaris, the spiny dye-murex, a source of the dye

The dye substance is a mucous secretion from the hypobranchial gland of one of several species of medium-sized predatory sea snails that are found in the eastern Mediterranean Sea, and off the Atlantic coast of Morocco. David Jacoby, citing the 1908 experiment by Paul Friedländer, remarks that "twelve thousand snails of Murex brandaris yield no more than 1.4 grams (22 grains) of pure dye, enough to colour only the trim of a single garment." These are the marine gastropods Bolinus brandaris the spiny dye-murex (originally known as Murex brandaris Linnaeus, 1758), the banded dye-murex Hexaplex trunculus, the rock-shell Stramonita haemastoma, and less commonly a number of other species such as Bolinus cornutus. The dye is an organic compound of bromine (i.e., an organobromine compound), a class of compounds often found in algae and in some other sea life, but much more rarely found in the biology of land animals. This dye is in contrast to the imitation purple that was commonly produced using cheaper materials than the dyes from the sea snail.

In nature, the snails use the secretion as part of their predatory behaviour to sedate prey and as an antimicrobial lining on egg masses. (Note: Because of research by Benkendorff et al. (1999), the Tyrian purple precursor tyrindoleninone is being investigated as a potential antimicrobial agent with uses against multidrug-resistant bacteria.) The snail also secretes this substance when it is attacked by predators, or physically antagonized by humans (e.g., poked). Therefore, the dye can be collected either by "milking" the snails, which is more labor-intensive but is a renewable resource, or by collecting and destructively crushing the snails. The dye is collected via the snail-harvesting process, involving the extraction of the hypobranchial gland (located under the mollusk's mantle). This requires advanced knowledge of biology. Murex-based dyeing must take place close to the site from which the snails originate, because the freshness of the material has a significant effect on the results, the colours yielded based on the long process of biochemical, enzymatic and photochemical reactions, and requires reduction and oxidation processes that probably took several days.

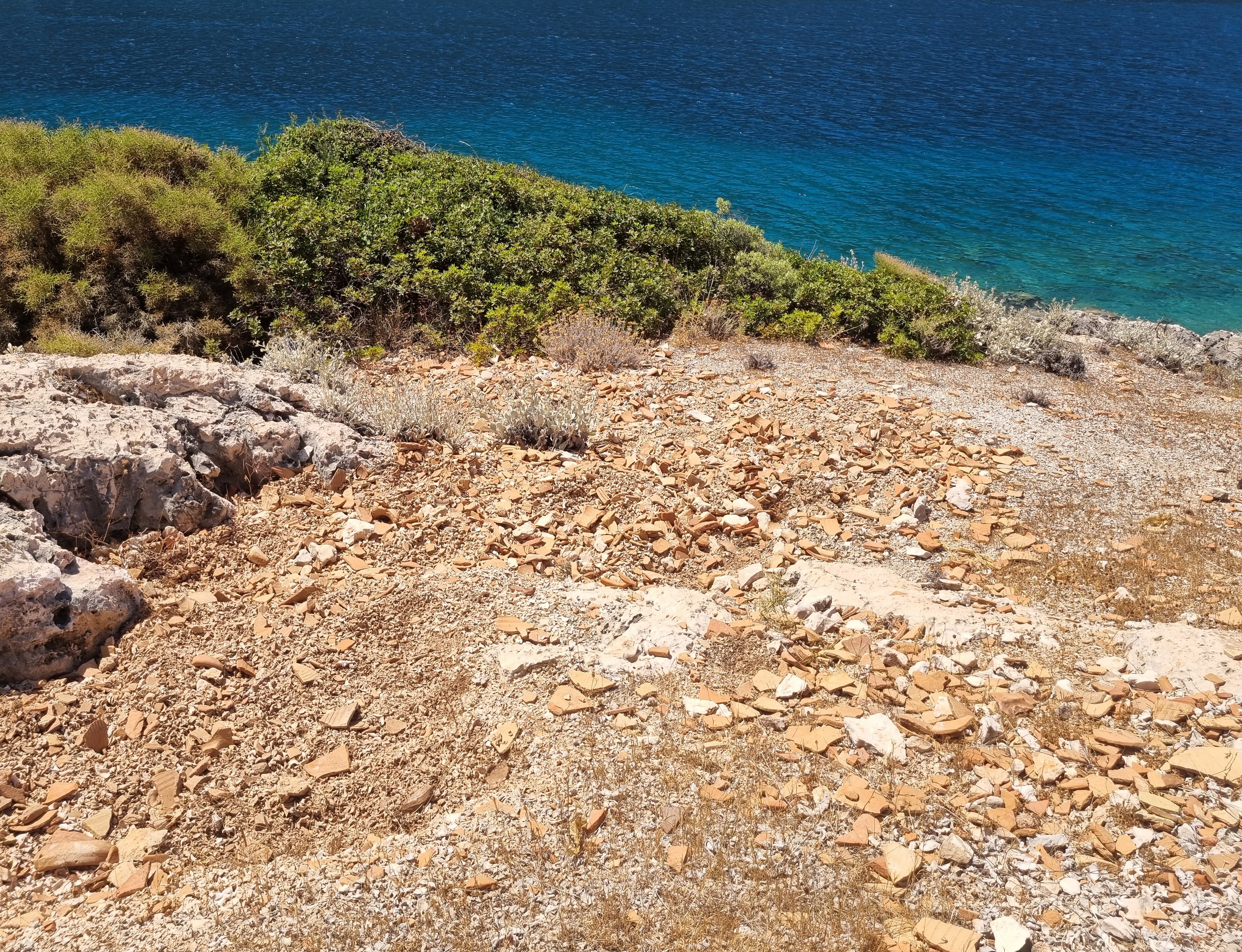
Murex shells at the site of purple dye production in ancient Aperlae, Lycia

Many other species worldwide within the family Muricidae, for example Plicopurpura pansa, from the tropical eastern Pacific, and Plicopurpura patula from the Caribbean zone of the western Atlantic, can also produce a similar substance (which turns into an enduring purple dye when exposed to sunlight) and this ability has sometimes also been historically exploited by local inhabitants in the areas where these snails occur. (Some other predatory gastropods, such as some wentletraps in the family Epitoniidae, seem to also produce a similar substance, although this has not been studied or exploited commercially.) The dog whelk Nucella lapillus, from the North Atlantic, can also be used to produce red-purple and violet dyes.

== Royal blue ==
The Phoenicians also made a deep blue-coloured dye, sometimes referred to as royal blue or hyacinth purple, which was made from a closely related species of marine snail.

The Phoenicians established an ancillary production facility on the Iles Purpuraires at Mogador, in Morocco. The sea snail harvested at this western Moroccan dye production facility was Hexaplex trunculus, also known by the older name Murex trunculus.

This second species of dye murex is found today on the Mediterranean and Atlantic coasts of Europe and Africa (Spain, Portugal, Morocco).

== Background ==
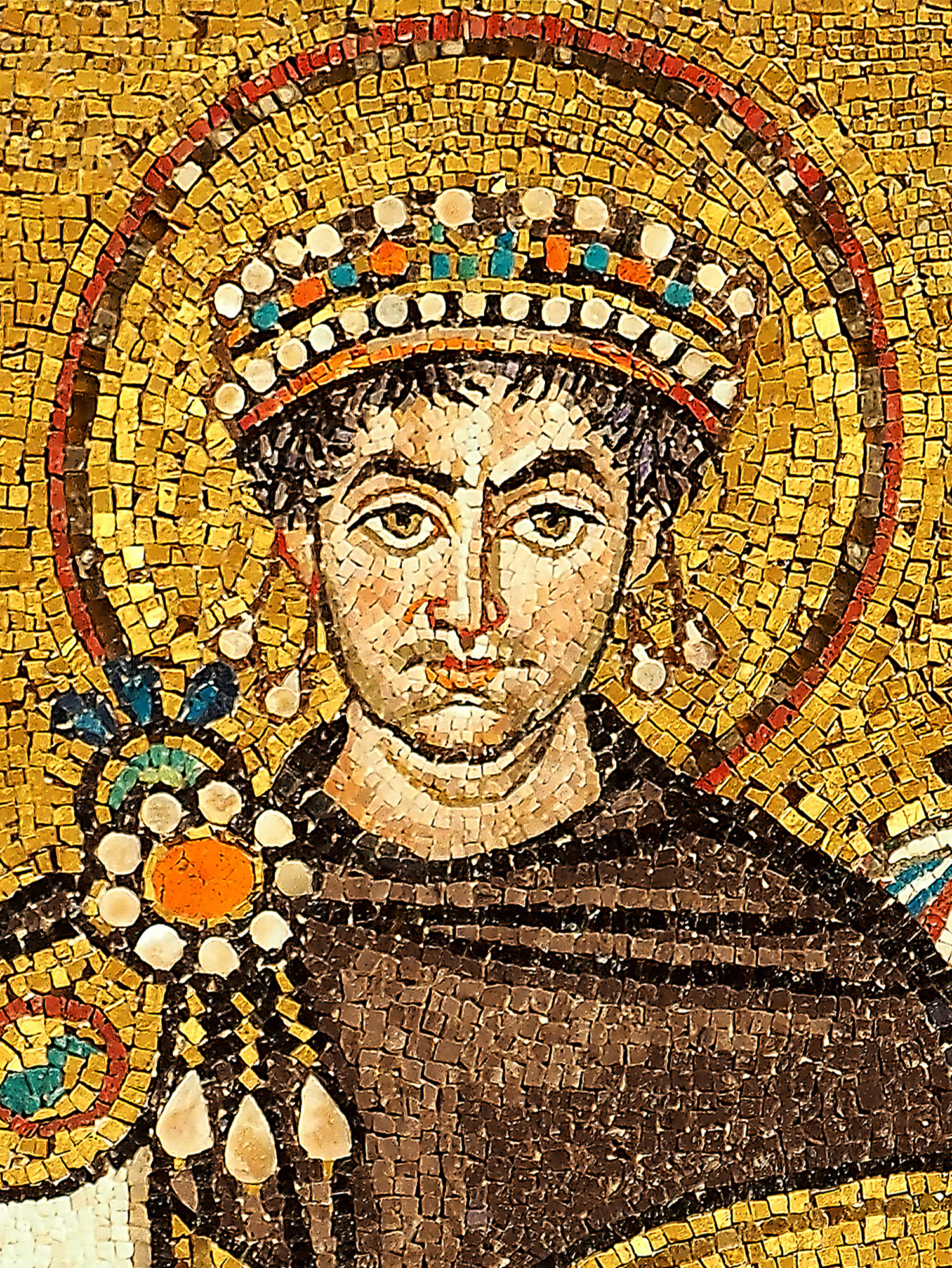
Byzantine Emperor Justinian I clad in Tyrian purple, 6th-century mosaic at Basilica of San Vitale, Ravenna, Italy

The colour-fast (non-fading) dye was an item of luxury trade, prized by Romans, who used it to colour ceremonial robes. Used as a dye, the colour shifts from blue (peak absorption at 590 nm, which is yellow-orange) to reddish-purple (peak absorption at 520 nm, which is green). It is believed that the intensity of the purple hue improved rather than faded as the dyed cloth aged. Vitruvius mentions the production of Tyrian purple from shellfish. In his History of Animals, Aristotle described the shellfish from which Tyrian purple was obtained and the process of extracting the tissue that produced the dye. Pliny the Elder described the production of Tyrian purple in his Natural History: (Note: The problem with Tyrian purple is that the precursor reacts very quickly with air and light to form an insoluble dye. (Hence Pliny says: "... when [the shellfish] have once discharged their waxy secretion, their juices have no consistency. ...") The cumbersome process that Pliny describes is necessary to reverse the oxidation and to restore the water-soluble precursor so that large masses of wool can be dyed. See: Biggam CP (2006). "Knowledge of whelk dyes and pigments in Anglo-Saxon England". Anglo-Saxon England. 35. pages 23–56; see especially pages 26–27. doi:10.1017/S0263675106000032. ISBN 978-0-521-88342-9. S2CID 162937239. See also: C. J. Cooksey (2001) "Tyrian purple: 6,6'-Dibromoindigo and Related Compounds", Molecules, 6 (9) : 736–769, especially page 761. Indigo, which is chemically very similar to Tyrian purple, behaves similarly. See: http://www.indigopage.com/chemistry.htm)

The most favourable season for taking these [shellfish] is after the rising of the Dog-star, or else before spring; for when they have once discharged their waxy secretion, their juices have no consistency: this, however, is a fact unknown in the dyers' workshops, although it is a point of primary importance. After it is taken, the vein [i.e. hypobranchial gland] is extracted, which we have previously spoken of, to which it is requisite to add salt, a sextarius [about 0.54 L, 19 imp fl oz, 18 US fl oz] to every hundred pounds of juice. It is sufficient to leave them to steep for a period of three days, and no more, for the fresher they are, the greater virtue there is in the liquor. It is then set to boil in vessels of tin [or lead], and every hundred amphorae ought to be boiled down to five hundred pounds of dye, by the application of a moderate heat; for which purpose the vessel is placed at the end of a long funnel, which communicates with the furnace; while thus boiling, the liquor is skimmed from time to time, and with it the flesh, which necessarily adheres to the veins. About the tenth day, generally, the whole contents of the cauldron are in a liquefied state, upon which a fleece, from which the grease has been cleansed, is plunged into it by way of making trial; but until such time as the colour is found to satisfy the wishes of those preparing it, the liquor is still kept on the boil. The tint that inclines to red is looked upon as inferior to that which is of a blackish hue. The wool is left to lie in soak for five hours, and then, after carding it, it is thrown in again, until it has fully imbibed the colour.

Archaeological data from Tyre indicate that the snails were collected in large vats and left to decompose. This produced a hideous stench that was mentioned by ancient authors. Not much is known about the subsequent steps, and the actual ancient method for mass-producing the two murex dyes has not yet been successfully reconstructed; this special "blackish clotted blood" colour, which was prized above all others, is believed to be achieved by double-dipping the cloth, once in the indigo dye of H. trunculus and once in the purple-red dye of B. brandaris.

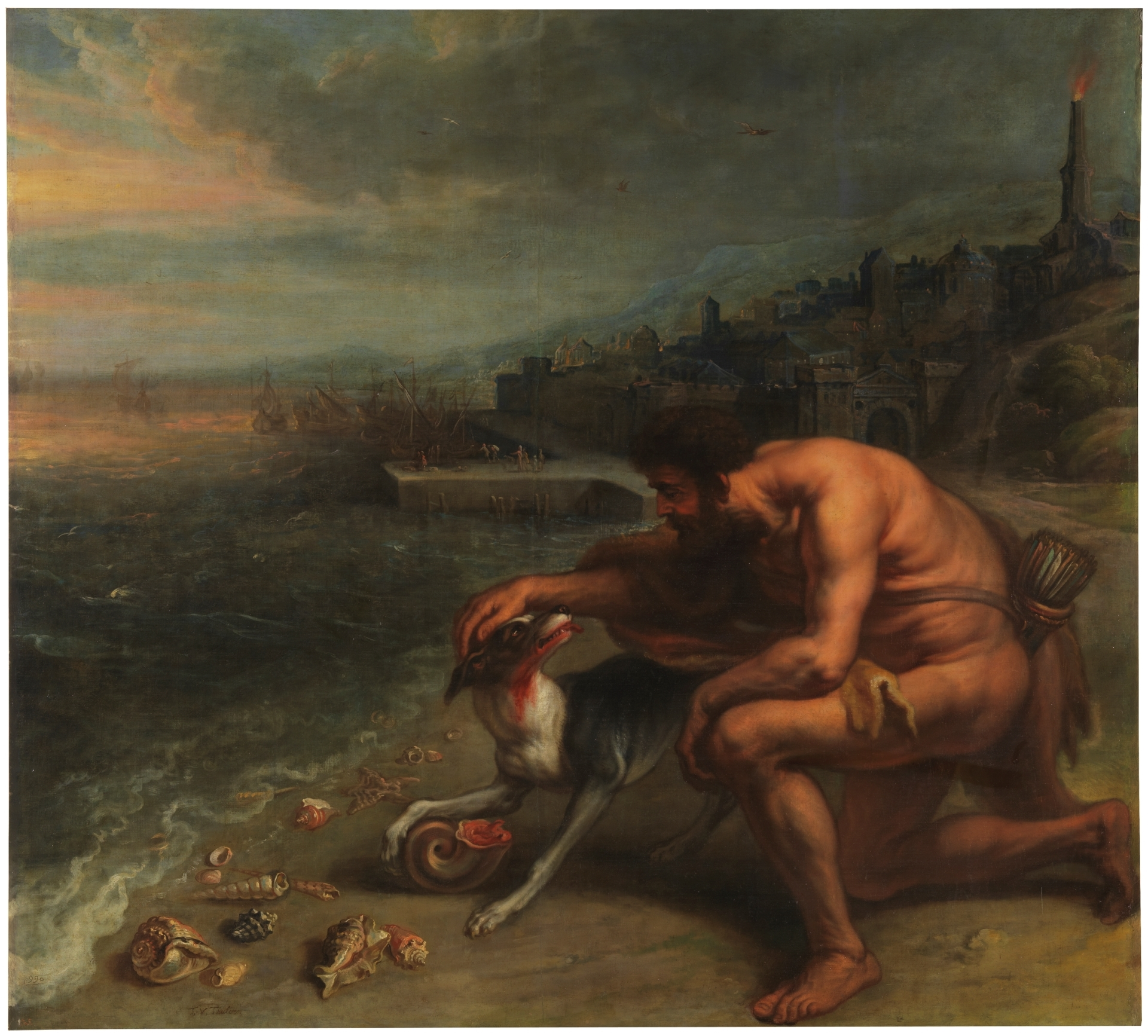
The Discovery of Purple by Hercules's Dog by Theodoor van Thulden, c. 1636

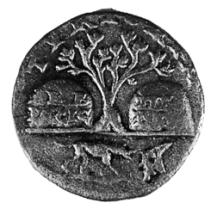
A Phoenicias coin depicting the legend of the dog biting the sea snail

The Roman mythographer Julius Pollux, writing in the 2nd century AD, recounts that the purple dye was first discovered by Heracles (Greek counterpart of the titular god of Tyre, Melqart) (Note: Melqart was equated with Heracles in Greek sources because both deities shared roles as heroic figures linked to strength, protection, and the founding of cities, which led to an interpretatio graeca—a Greek practice of identifying foreign gods with their own.) while being in Tyre to visit his beloved Tyros, or rather, by his dog, whose mouth was stained purple after biting into a snail on the beach. This story was depicted by Peter Paul Rubens in his painting Hercules' Dog Discovers Purple Dye. According to John Malalas, the incident happened during the reign of the legendary King Phoenix of Tyre, the eponymous progenitor of the Phoenicians, and therefore he was the first ruler to wear Tyrian purple and legislate on its use.

Recently, the archaeological discovery of substantial numbers of Murex shells on Crete suggests that the Minoans may have pioneered the extraction of Imperial purple centuries before the Tyrians. Dating from collocated pottery suggests the dye may have been produced during the Middle Minoan period in the 20th–18th century BC. Accumulations of crushed murex shells from a hut at the site of Coppa Nevigata in southern Italy may indicate production of purple dye there from at least the 18th century BC. Additional archaeological evidence can be found from samples originating from excavations at the extensive Iron Age copper smelting site of "Slaves' Hill" (Site 34), which is tightly dated by radiocarbon to the late 11th–early 10th centuries BC. Findings from this site include evidence of the use of purple dye found in stains used on pot shards. Evidence of the use of dye in pottery are found in most cases on the upper part of ceramic basins, on the inside surface, the areas in which the reduced dye-solution was exposed to air, and underwent oxidation that turned it purple.

In the Late Bronze Age Hala Sultan Tekke on Cyprus was a major exporter of purple-dyed textiles with the dye coming from the mucus gland of the murex sea snail.

The production of Murex purple for the Byzantine court came to an abrupt end with the sack of Constantinople in 1204, the critical episode of the Fourth Crusade. David Jacoby concludes that "no Byzantine emperor nor any Latin ruler in former Byzantine territories could muster the financial resources required for the pursuit of murex purple production. On the other hand, murex fishing and dyeing with genuine purple are attested for Egypt in the tenth to 13th centuries." By contrast, Jacoby finds that there are no mentions of purple fishing or dyeing, nor trade in the colorant in any Western source, even in the Frankish Levant. The European West turned instead to kermes dye provided by the insect Kermes vermilio, known as grana, or crimson.

In 1909, Harvard anthropologist Zelia Nuttall compiled an intensive comparative study on the historical production of the purple dye produced from the carnivorous murex snail, source of the royal purple dye valued higher than gold in the ancient Near East and ancient Mexico. Not only did the people of ancient Mexico use the same methods of production as the Phoenicians, they also valued murex-dyed cloth above all others, as it appeared in codices as the attire of nobility. "Nuttall noted that the Mexican murex-dyed cloth bore a "disagreeable ... strong fishy smell, which appears to be as lasting as the colour itself." Likewise, the ancient Egyptian Papyrus of Anastasi laments: "The hands of the dyer reek like rotting fish". So pervasive was this stench that the Talmud specifically granted women the right to divorce any husband who became a dyer after marriage.

In 2021, archaeologists found surviving wool fibers dyed with royal purple in the Timna Valley in Israel. The find, which was dated to c. 1000 BC, constituted the first direct evidence of fabric dyed with the pigment from antiquity.

== Murex purple production in North Africa ==
The chemical structure of 6,6'-dibromoindigo, the main component of Tyrian purple

Murex purple was a very important industry in many Phoenician territories and Carthage was no exception. Traces of this once very lucrative industry are still visible in many Punic sites such as Kerkouane, Zouchis, Djerba and even in Carthage itself. According to Pliny, Meninx (today's Djerba) produced the best purple in Africa which was also ranked second only after Tyre's. It was found also at Essaouira (Morocco). The Royal purple or Imperial purple was probably used until the time of Augustine of Hippo (354–430) and before the demise of the Roman Empire.

== Dye chemistry ==
Variations in colours of "Tyrian purple" from different snails are related to the presence of indigo dye (blue), 6-bromoindigo (purple), and the red 6,6'-dibromoindigo. Additional changes in colour can be induced by debromination from light exposure (as is the case for Tekhelet) or by heat processing. The final shade of purple is decided by chromatogram, which can be identified by high performance liquid chromatography analysis in a single measurement: indigotin (IND) and indirubin (INR). The two are found in plant sources such as woad (Isatis tinctoria L.) and the indigo plant (Indigofera tinctoria L), as well as in several species of shellfish.

In 1998, by means of a lengthy trial and error process, a process for dyeing with Tyrian purple was rediscovered. This finding built on reports from the 15th century to the 18th century and explored the biotechnology process behind woad fermentation. It is hypothesized that an alkaline fermenting vat was necessary. An incomplete ancient recipe for Tyrian purple recorded by Pliny the Elder was also consulted. By altering the percentage of sea salt in the dye vat and adding potash, he was able to successfully dye wool a deep purple colour.

Recent research in organic electronics has shown that Tyrian purple is an ambipolar organic semiconductor. Transistors and circuits based on this material can be produced from sublimed thin-films of the dye. The good semiconducting properties of the dye originate from strong intermolecular hydrogen bonding that reinforces pi stacking necessary for transport.

== Modern hue rendering ==
True Tyrian purple, like most high-chroma pigments, cannot be accurately rendered on a standard RGB computer monitor. Ancient reports are also not entirely consistent, but these swatches give a rough indication of the likely range in which it appeared:

_________
_________

The lower one is the sRGB colour #990024, intended for viewing on an output device with a gamma of 2.2. It is a representation of RHS colour code 66A, which has been equated to "Tyrian red", a term which is often used as a synonym for Tyrian purple.

== Philately ==
The colour name "Tyrian plum" is popularly given to a British postage stamp that was prepared, but never released to the public, shortly before the death of King Edward VII in 1910.

== Gallery ==
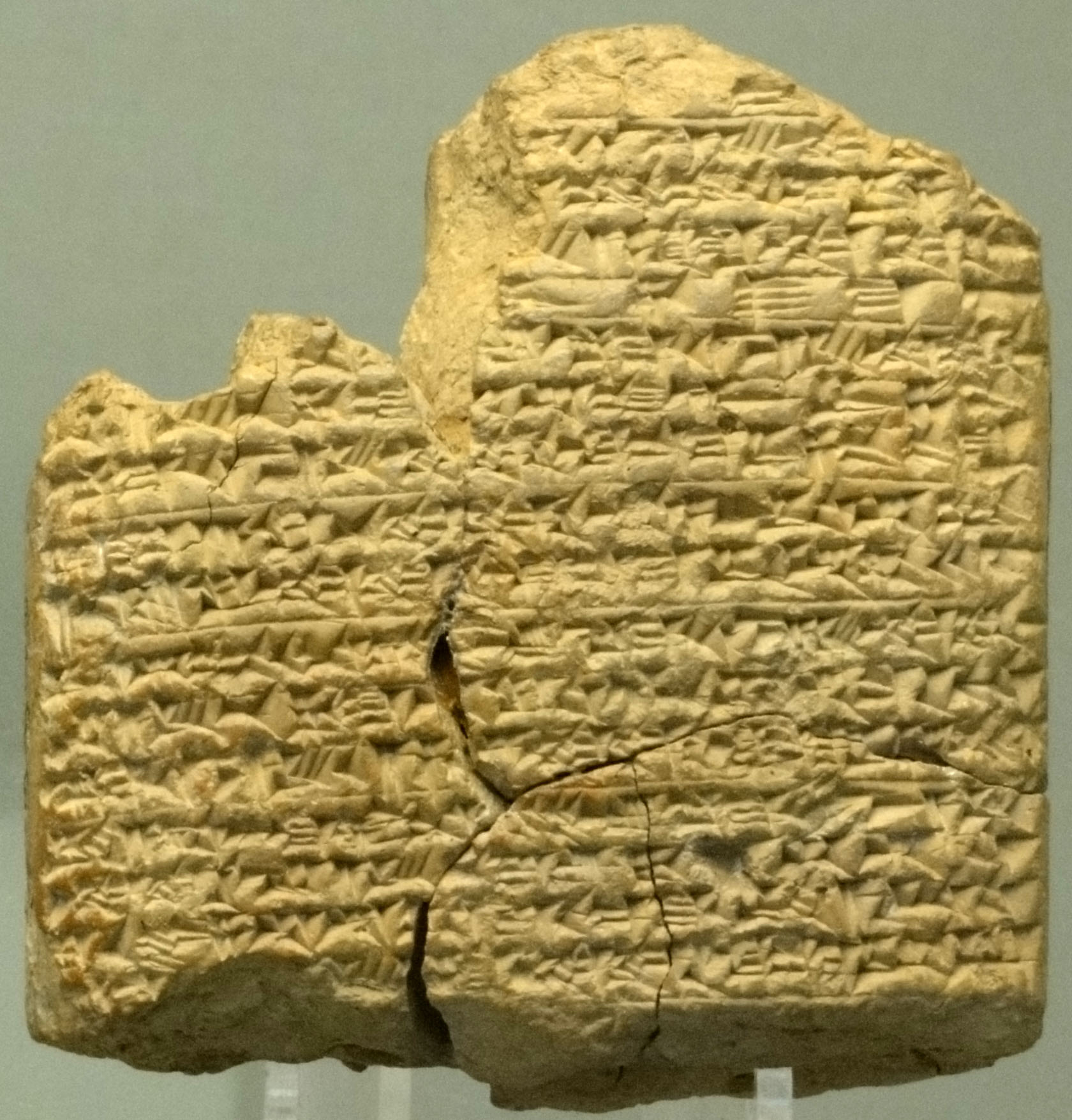
Cuneiform tablet, dated 600–500 BC, with instructions for dyeing wool purple and blue. Ref.BM62788 .

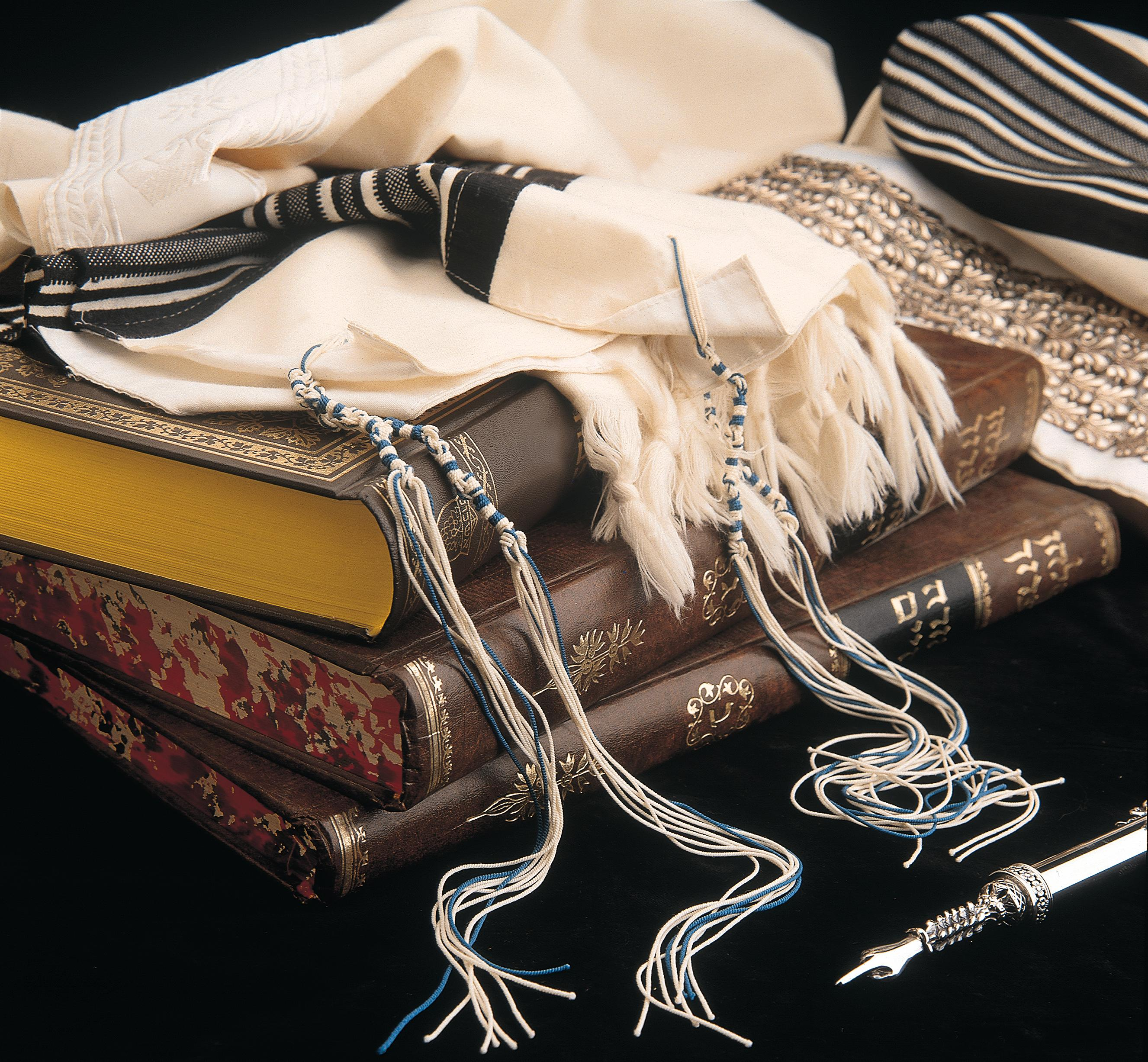
A set of Tzitzit, four tassels or "fringes" with tekhelet (purple-blue) threads produced from a Hexaplex trunculus based dye

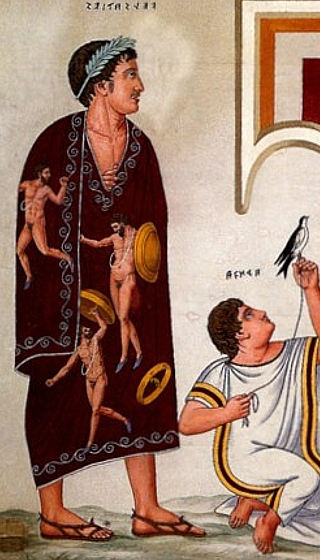
Painting of a man wearing an all-purple toga picta, from an Etruscan tomb (about 350 BC)

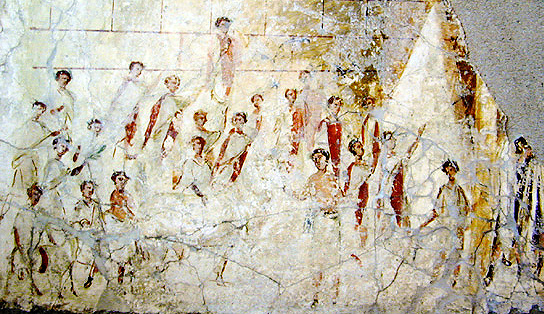
Roman men wearing togae praetextae with reddish-purple stripes during a religious procession (1st century BC)

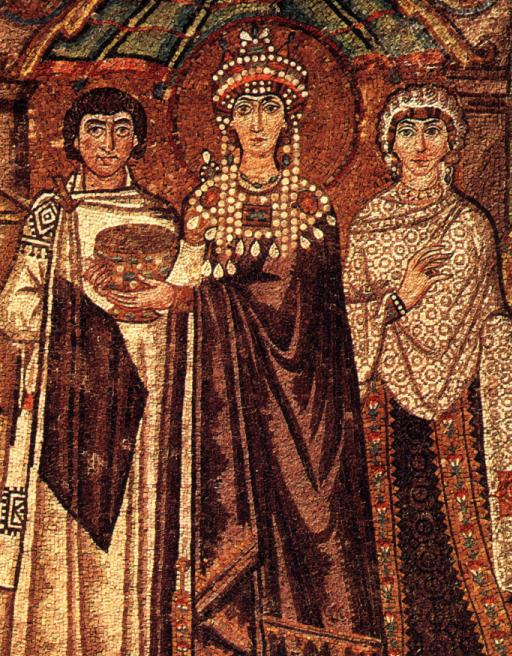
The Empress Theodora, the wife of the Emperor Justinian, dressed in Tyrian purple (6th century)

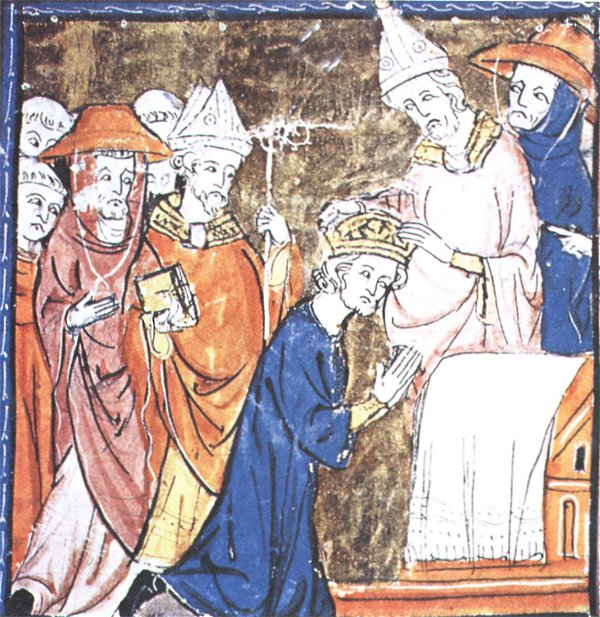
A medieval depiction of the coronation of the Emperor Charlemagne in 800 AD wearing royal blue. The bishops and cardinals wear Tyrian purple, and the Pope wears white.

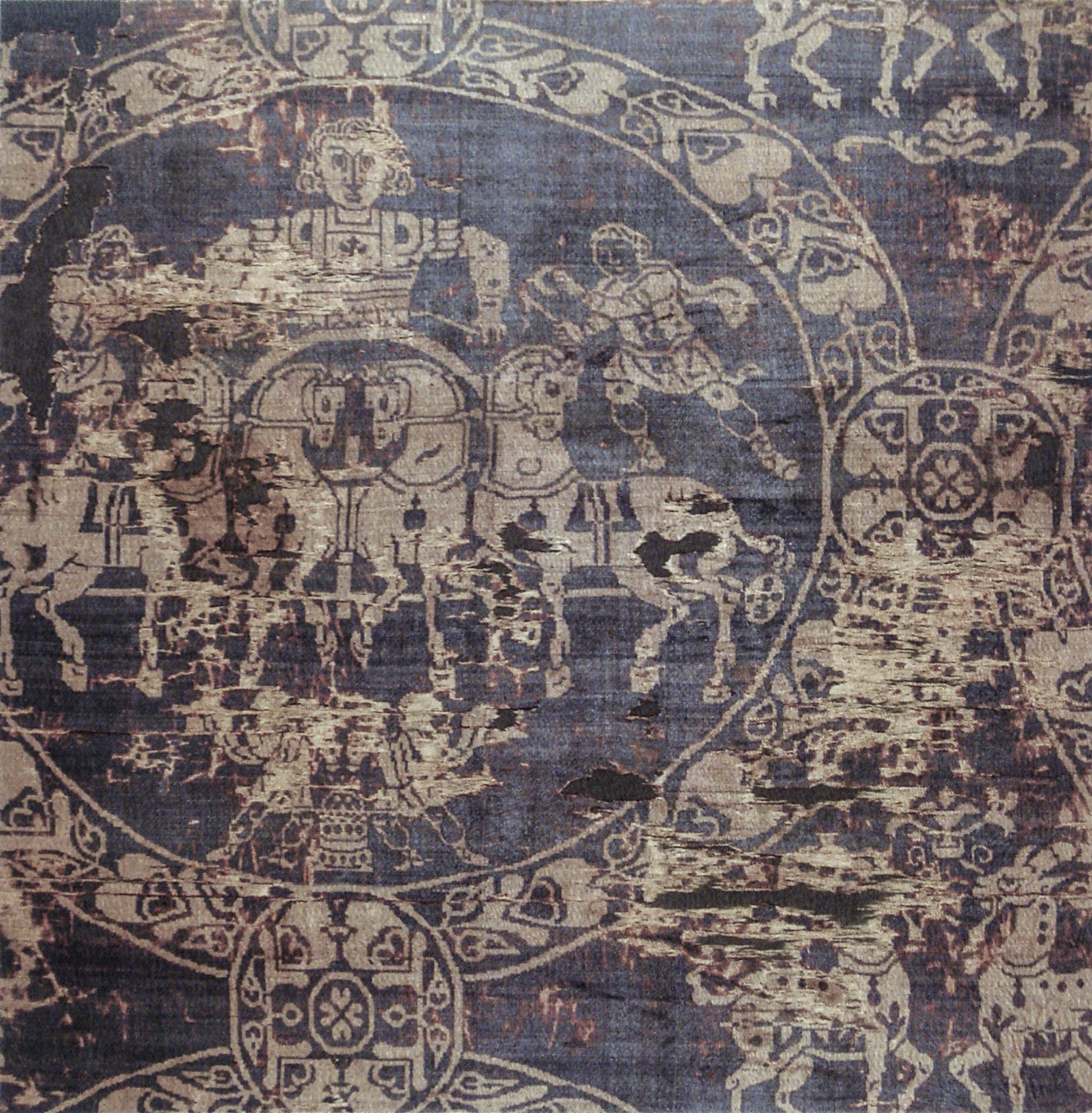
A fragment of the shroud in which the Emperor Charlemagne was buried in 814 AD. It was made of gold and Tyrian purple from Constantinople.

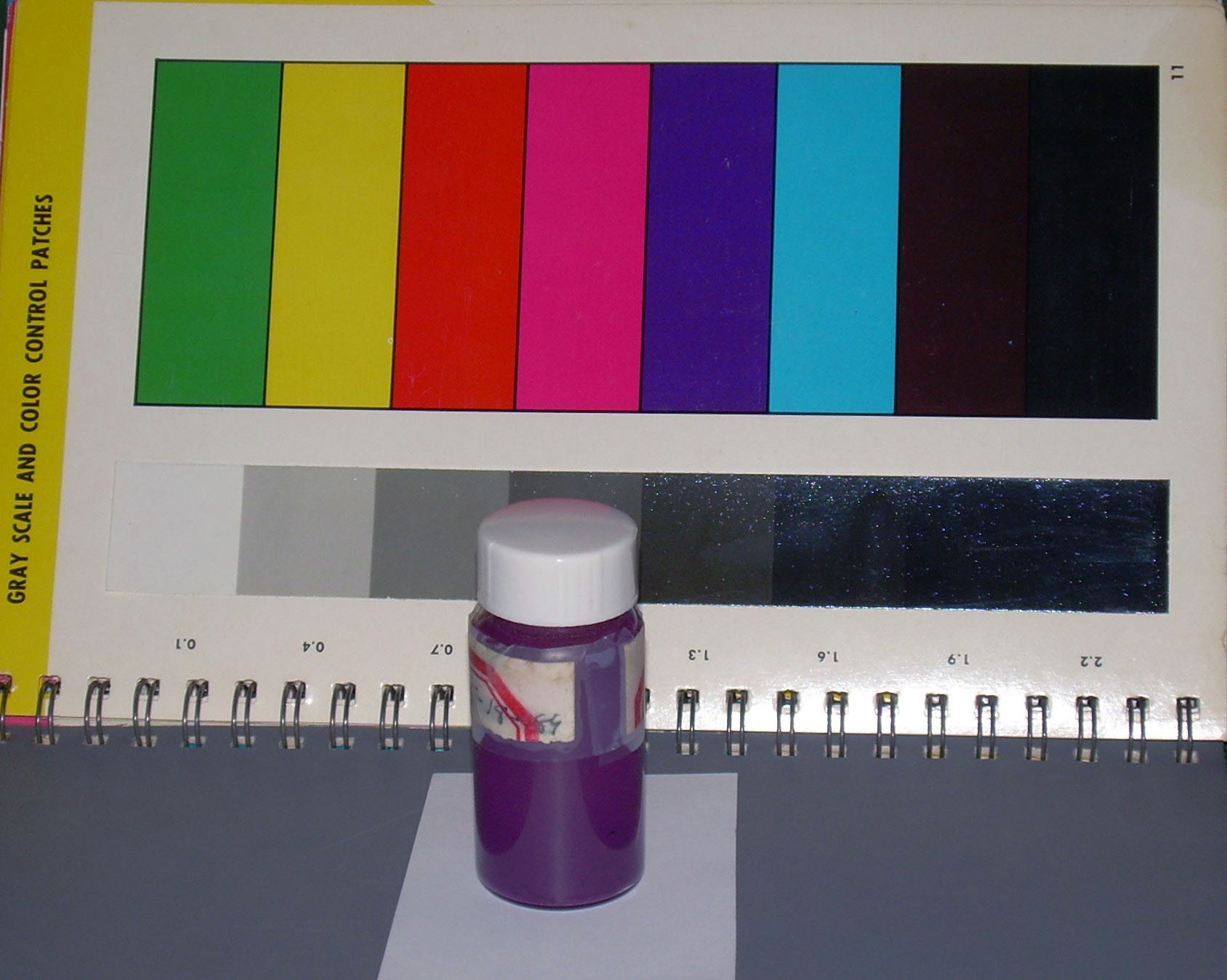
6,6'-dibromoindigo, the major component of Tyrian purple
