= Hypobranchial gland =

The hypobranchial gland is a glandular structure which is part of the anatomy of many mollusks, including several different families of gastropods, and also many protobranch bivalves. This gland produces mucus as well as biologically active compounds. The cephalopod ink sac is a modified hypobranchial gland.

== Anatomy and function ==
Gastropods

The hypobranchial gland is found in many sea snails, including those in the families Haliotidae, Buccinidae, Mitridae and Costellariidae. It usually presents itself as a thickening of the tissue located in the roof of the animal's mantle cavity. This is in association with parts of the aquatic mollusk anatomy that perform sediment consolidation in these organisms. However, this gland is absent in all terrestrial gastropods except the Neritacea. Its morphology, however, is variable between different groups of snails.

Glands with similar functions are present in the Nuculidae, Solenomyidae, Monia, Patellacea, and Loritcata.

In the Haliotidae, this gland has two lobes in the roof of the mantle cavity with the left larger than the right. It is deeply ridged and secretes mucus. The purpose of the mucus is to trap, collect, and excrete sediment that collects as water flows over the gills of these organisms.

Aculifera

In the aculifera the hypobranchial glands are referred to as "mucus tracts" and occupy a posterior position in the body.

=== Bacterial community ===
In a study done on individuals from the species Dicathais orbita, a member of the Muricidae family, it was found that the bacterial community of the hypobranchial gland was highly specialized; the community was dominated by two genera, Mycoplasma and Vibrio, which are known to contain biosynthetic species. These bacterial communities were compared to the foot of the individuals which had a larger variety of bacterial inhabitants.

=== Toxins ===
Some extracts from the hypobranchial gland have shown some toxic effects on human granulosa cells, cells inside the ovaries. These extracts can affect the hormone production of the reproductive system. As for all toxins, the effect is dependent on the dose and length of exposure to these extracts.

== Human use ==
=== Tyrian purple ===
There have been studies on some species within the family Muricidae, because in those species this gland secretes the precursor to the historically important natural dye, Tyrian purple. This dye has potential origins in history as early as 2000 BC in some areas of Europe and Asia. Due to the expensive process of dying fabrics with the hypobranchial glands of mollusks, fabrics dyed Tyrian purple were considered a symbol of wealth and royalty throughout much of history. It is synthesized from the dye precursor 6-6 dibromoindigo.

=== Medical applications ===
There are some potential medical applications for the hypobranchial glands of mollusks ranging from anti-inflammatories, to anti-bacterials, to cancer. Some of these uses were found by analyzing traditional medicine and therapeutic techniques from a variety of different cultures. In Ancient Greece, extracts from this gland were used as laxatives and diuretics with the potential for some side effects including increases in sweat and saliva productions.

==== Anti-bacterial Uses ====
- MeOH (Methanol) inhibited marine biofilm growth
- DCM (Dichloromethane) inhibited marine biofilm growth
- (CH₃)₂CO (Acetone) inhibited marine biofilm growth

Other extracts from the hemolymph of these mollusks have been shown to inhibit the growth of human pathogens.

==== Anti-inflammatory uses ====
- In lab cell lines and various animal models, extracts from the hypobranchial gland have shown a variety of muscle relaxing properties including the ability to act as a neuromuscular block, an anticonvulsant, a pain killer, and a sedative.

==== Cancer treatments ====
- Chloroform extracts can inhibit the growth of lymphoma (cancer of the lung), reproductive system cancers, and colon cancer.
- A pigment in Tyrian purple, 6-dibromoindirubin, may slow the spread of a variety of cancers including lung, stomach, colon, abdominal, and leukaemia cancers.
- Extracts from the glands of Hexaplex trunculus showed possible adhesion inhibition of cervical and glioblastoma cells, which can decrease the frequency of tumor formation.

== Literature cited ==
- Fretter, V. & Graham, A. 1962. British Prosobranch Molluscs. 1st ed. London: The Ray Society, 755 pp.
- Westley, C., Lewis, M. C. and Benkendorff, K. 2010. Histomorphology of the hypobranchial gland in Dicanthais orbita (Gmelin, 1791) (Neogastropoda: Muricidae). Journal of Molluscan Studies 76(2): 186–195.
- The hypobranchial gland from the purple snail Plicopurpura pansa (Gould, 1853) (Prosobranchia: Murididae). Journal of Shellfish Research, August 1, 2006
- Pontarotti, P. 2010. Evolutionary Biology: Concepts, Molecular and Morphological Evolution . Springer, 363 pp.
