= 6,6'-Dibromoindigo =

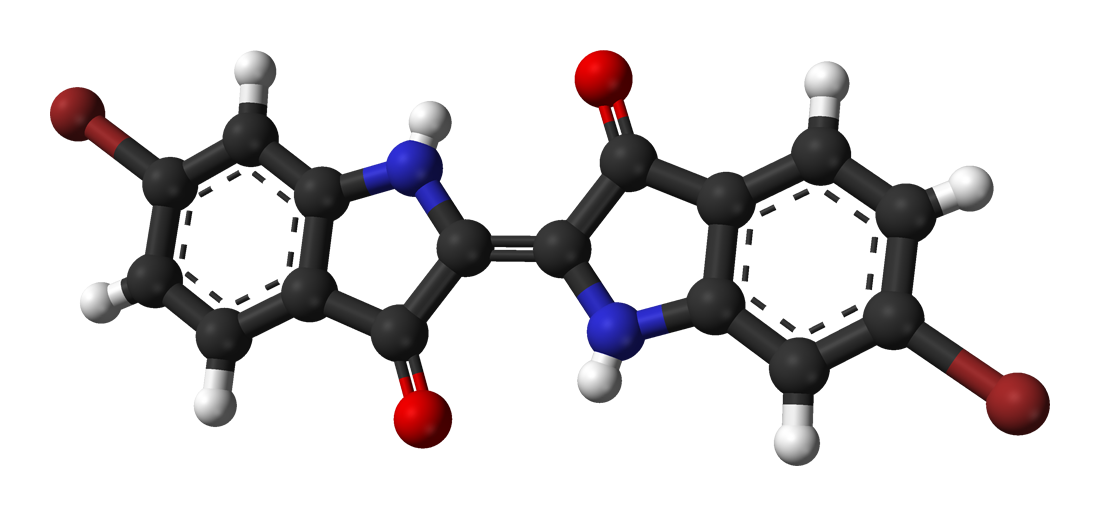

Names
- Other names 6BrIG; Tyrian purple

Identifiers
CAS Number	1277170-99-6
3D model (JSmol)	Interactive image
ChEBI	CHEBI:80914
ChemSpider	4590500
KEGG	C17084
PubChem CID	177057
UNII	2O3DDL8TAF
CompTox Dashboard (EPA)	DTXSID801314818
- InChI: InChI=1S/C16H8Br2N2O2/c17-7-1-3-9-11(5-7)19-13(15(9)21)14-16(22)10-4-2-8(18)6-12(10)20-14/h1-6,19,21H; Key: UOZOCOQLYQNHII-UHFFFAOYSA-N
- SMILES: C1=CC2=C(C=C1Br)NC(=C2O)C3=NC4=C(C3=O)C=CC(=C4)Br

Properties
Chemical formula	C_{16}H_{8}Br_{2}N_{2}O_{2}
Molar mass	420.060 g·mol^{−1}
Appearance	purple solid
- Except where otherwise noted, data are given for materials in their standard state (at 25 °C [77 °F], 100 kPa). Infobox references

6,6′-Dibromoindigo is an organic compound with the formula (BrC_{6}H_{3}C(O)CNH)_{2}. A deep purple solid, the compound is also known as Tyrian purple, a dye of historic significance. Presently, it is only a curiosity, although the related derivative indigo is of industrial significance. It is produced by snails of the family Muricidae.

The pure compound has semiconductor properties in the thin film phase, which is potentially useful for wearable electronics, and has better performance than the parent indigo in this context.

== Biosynthesis ==
Biosynthesis of the molecule is intermediated by tyrindoxyl sulphate. The molecule consists of a pair of monobrominated indolin-3-one rings linked by a carbon–carbon double bond.

Dibromoindigo can also be produced enzymatically in vitro from the amino acid tryptophan. The sequence begins with bromination of the benzo ring followed by conversion to 6-bromoindole. Flavin-containing monooxygenase then couples two of these indole units to give the dye.

== Chemical synthesis ==
The main chemical constituent of the Tyrian dye was discovered by Paul Friedländer in 1909 to be 6,6′-dibromoindigo, derivative of indigo dye, which had been synthesized in 1903. Although the first chemical synthesis was reported in 1914, unlike indigo, it has never been synthesized at commercial level. An efficient protocol for laboratory synthesis of dibromoindigo was developed by Wolk and Frimer in 2010.
