= Journal of Shellfish Research =

American academic journal

- Discipline: Carcinology
- Language: English
- Edited by: Sandra E. Shumway

Publication details
- History: 1982–present
- Publisher: National Shellfisheries Association (United States)
- Frequency: Triannually
- Impact factor: 1.0 (2024)

Standard abbreviations
- ISO 4: J. Shellfish Res.

Indexing
- CODEN: JSHRDA
- ISSN: 0730-8000 (print); 1943-6319 (web)
- LCCN: 82641021
- OCLC no.: 262536474

Links
- Journal homepage; Online access; Online archive; Journal page on association website

The Journal of Shellfish Research is a triannual peer-reviewed scientific journal published by the National Shellfisheries Association and available through the BioOne digital library. It covers all aspects of research on shellfish. The editor-in-chief is Sandra E. Shumway (University of Connecticut).

== Abstracting and indexing ==
The journal is abstracted and indexed in:

- Aquatic Sciences and Fisheries Abstracts
- Biological Abstracts
- BIOSIS Previews
- Chemical Abstracts Service
- Current Contents/Agriculture, Biology and Environmental Sciences
- Science Citation Index Expanded
- Scopus
- The Zoological Record

According to the Journal Citation Reports, the journal has a 2024 impact factor of 1.0.
