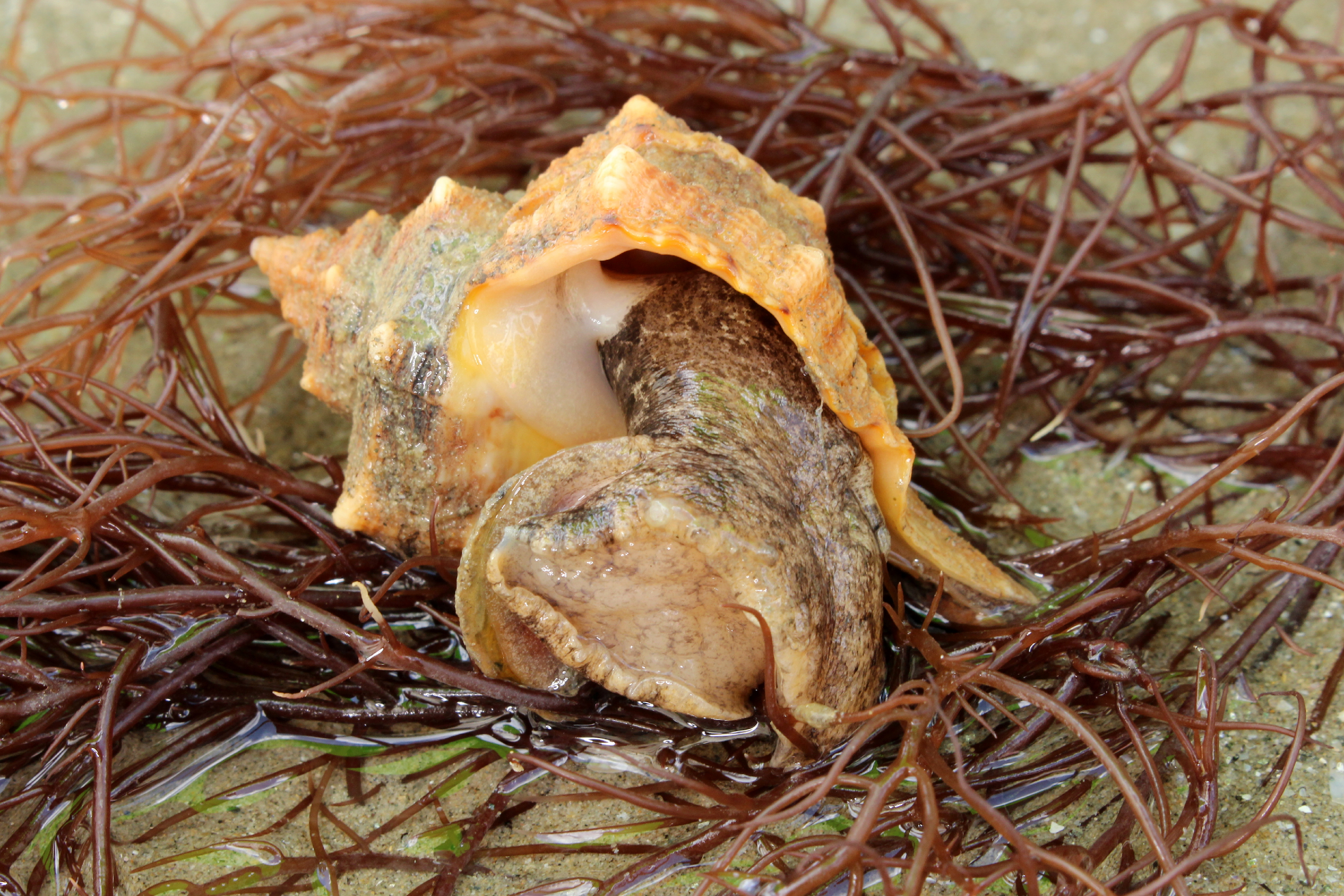
- Bolinus brandaris in the Adriatic Sea at Porto Garibaldi, Italy

Scientific classification
- Kingdom: Animalia
- Phylum: Mollusca
- Class: Gastropoda
- Subclass: Caenogastropoda
- Order: Neogastropoda
- Family: Muricidae
- Genus: Bolinus
- Species: B. brandaris

Binomial name
- Bolinus brandaris (Linnaeus, 1758)

= Bolinus brandaris =

Bolinus brandaris Temporal range: Pliocene - Recent

Species of gastropod

Bolinus brandaris (originally called Murex brandaris by Linnaeus; synonym Haustellum brandaris), and commonly known as the purple dye murex or the spiny dye-murex, is a species of medium-sized predatory sea snail, an edible marine gastropod mollusc in the family Muricidae, the murex snails or the rock snails.

This species is also known in the fossil record from the Pliocene (age range: from 3.6 to 2.588 million years ago). Fossil shells of this species have been found in Cyprus, Spain and Italy. It was used by the Phoenicians in ancient times to extract imperial Tyrian purple dye.

== Distribution and habitat ==
This snail lives in the central and western parts of the Mediterranean Sea and has been found on isolated coral atoll beaches in the Indian Ocean and South China Sea. It was known since ancient times as a source for purple dye and also as a popular food source under various names, among which sconciglio, from which comes the word scungilli. This species lives on rocks in shallow water.

== Human use ==
This species, like many other species in the family Muricidae, can produce a secretion which is milky and without colour when fresh, but turns into a powerful and lasting dye when exposed to the air. This was the mollusc species used by the ancients to produce the Tyrian purple fabric dye.

Sea snails of the species banded dye-murex Hexaplex trunculus were also used to produce a purple-blue or indigo dye. In both cases, the molluscs secrete the dye in the mucus of their hypobranchial glands.

In Spain, and more specifically on the Mediterranean coast and the Gulf of Cádiz, they are called cañaílla, and are appreciated as food.

It is a cannibalistic species; evidence suggests that intensive breeding by the ancient Minoans resulted in pierced shells, perhaps by other snails, due to the population density in breeding tanks.

== Biology ==
=== Shell ===
The size of the adult shell of Bolinus brandaris can reach about 6 to 9 cm. The shell is usually golden brown with a very long siphonal canal and a rounded body whorl with a low spire. There is a row of spines that corresponds to the end of each growth stage.

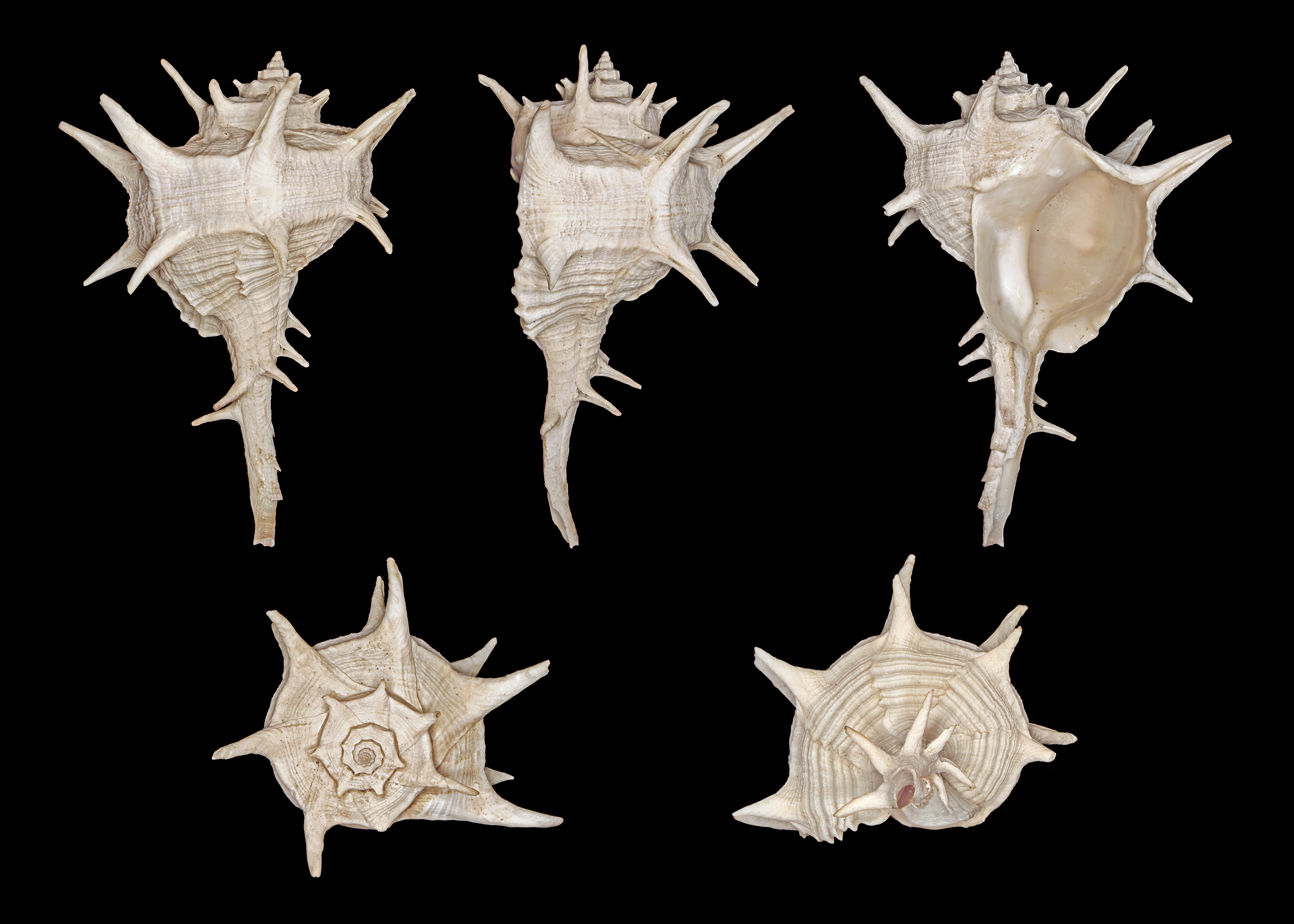
Different views of a shell of Bolinus brandaris

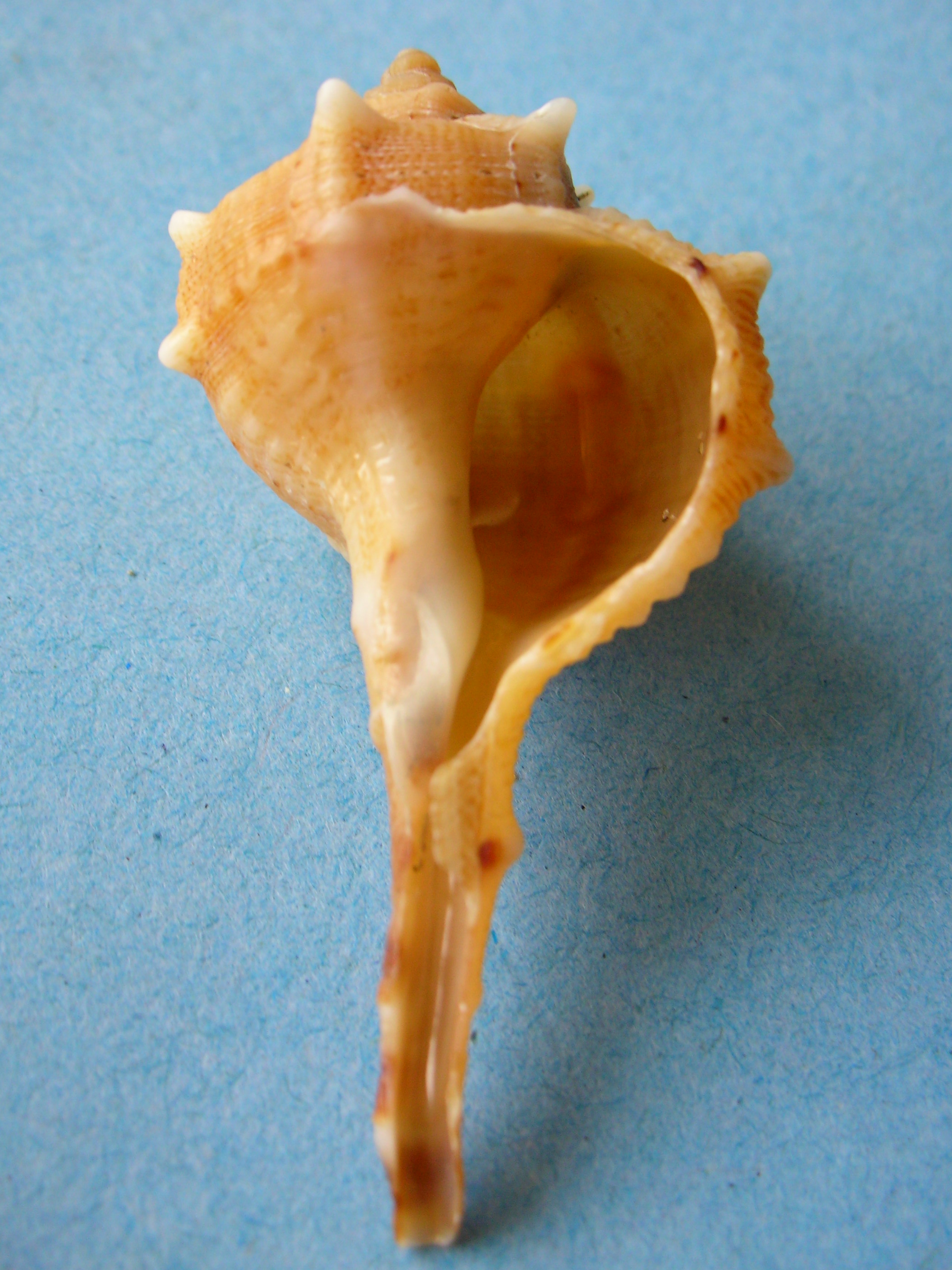
A shell of Bolinus brandaris with a broken lip because it was between growth stages when it died, and the edge of the aperture is easily damaged during that time.

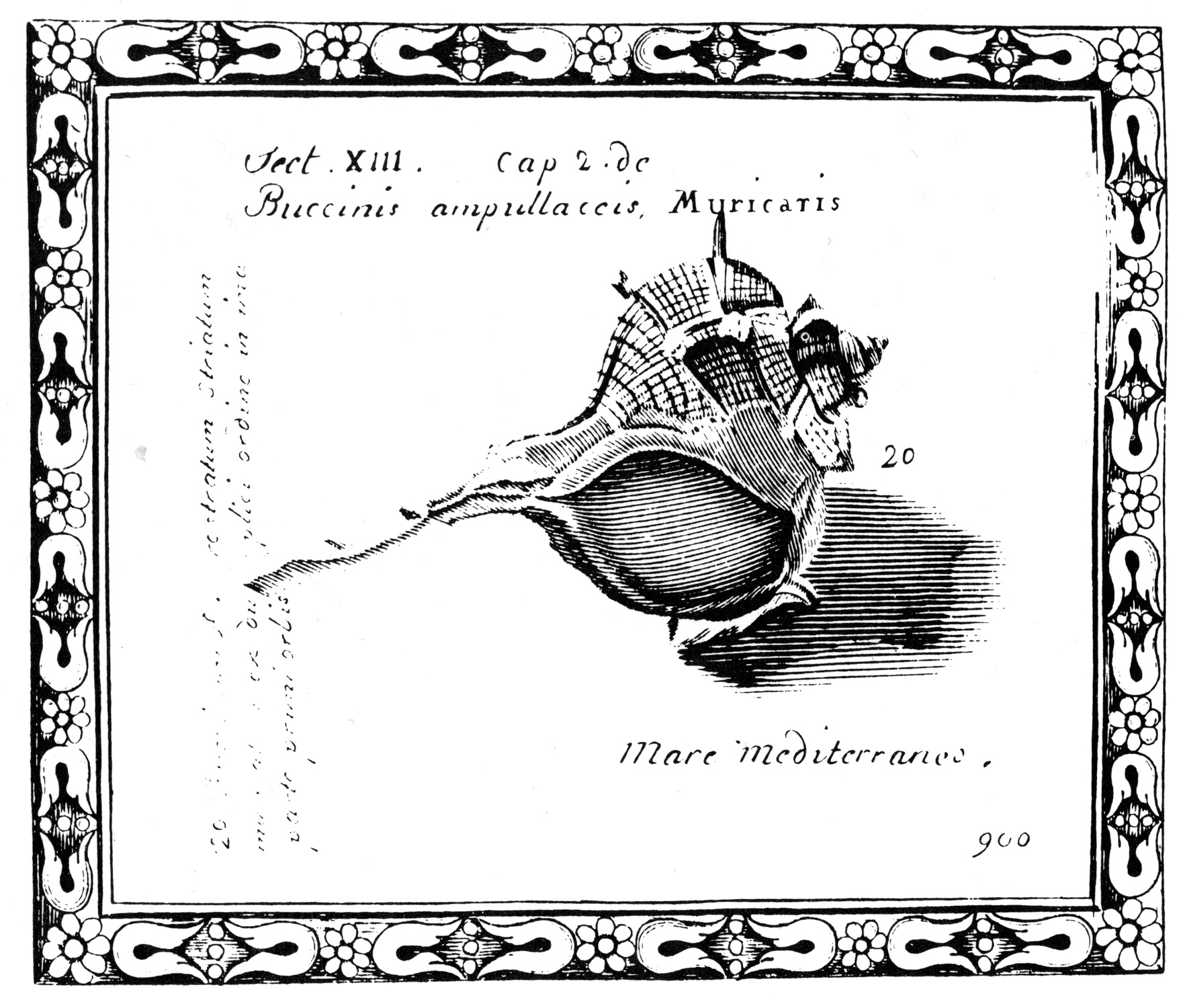
An illustration of the species from Martin Lister's 17th century shell book.

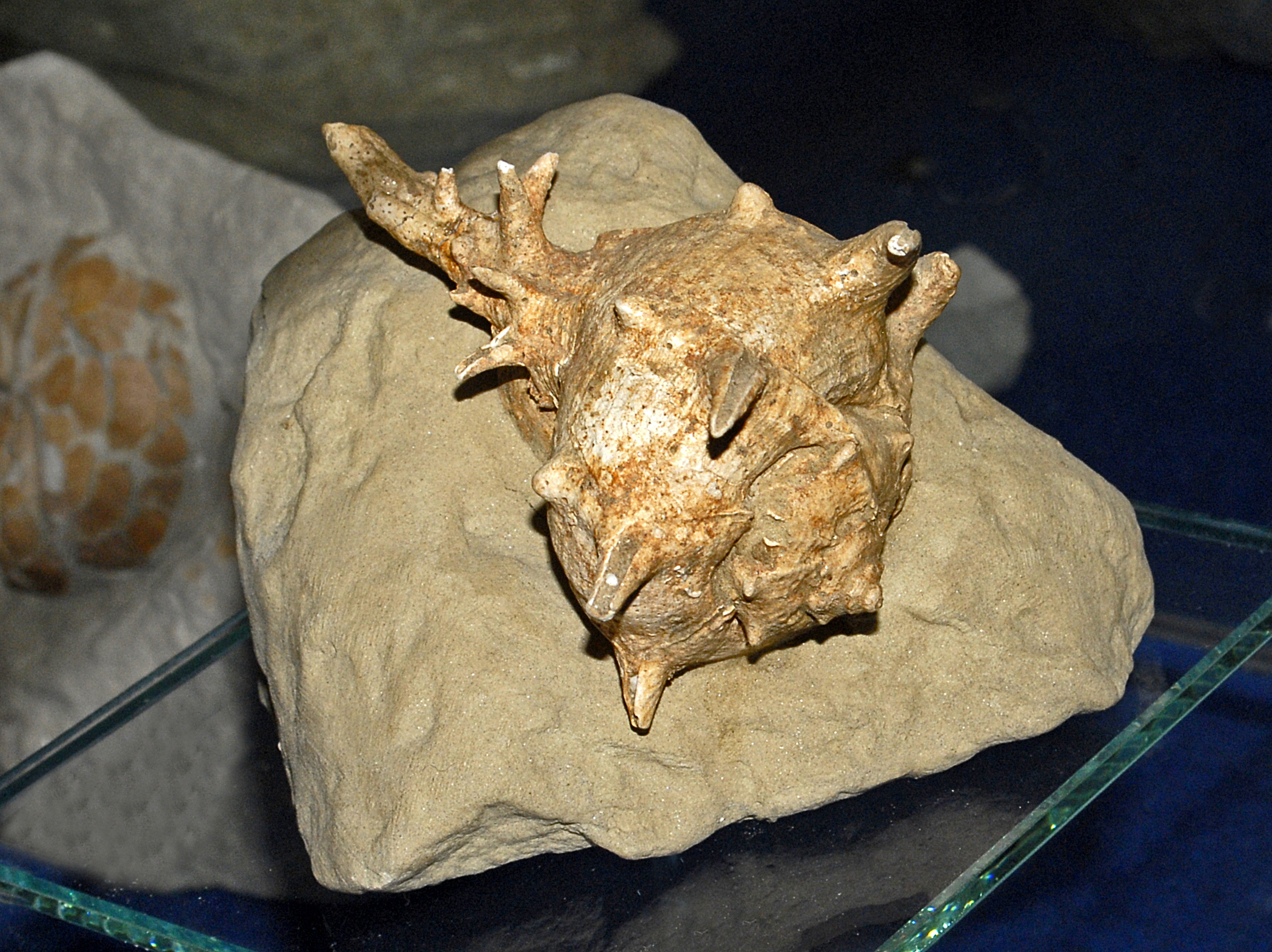
Fossil shell of Bolinus brandaris torularius from Pliocene

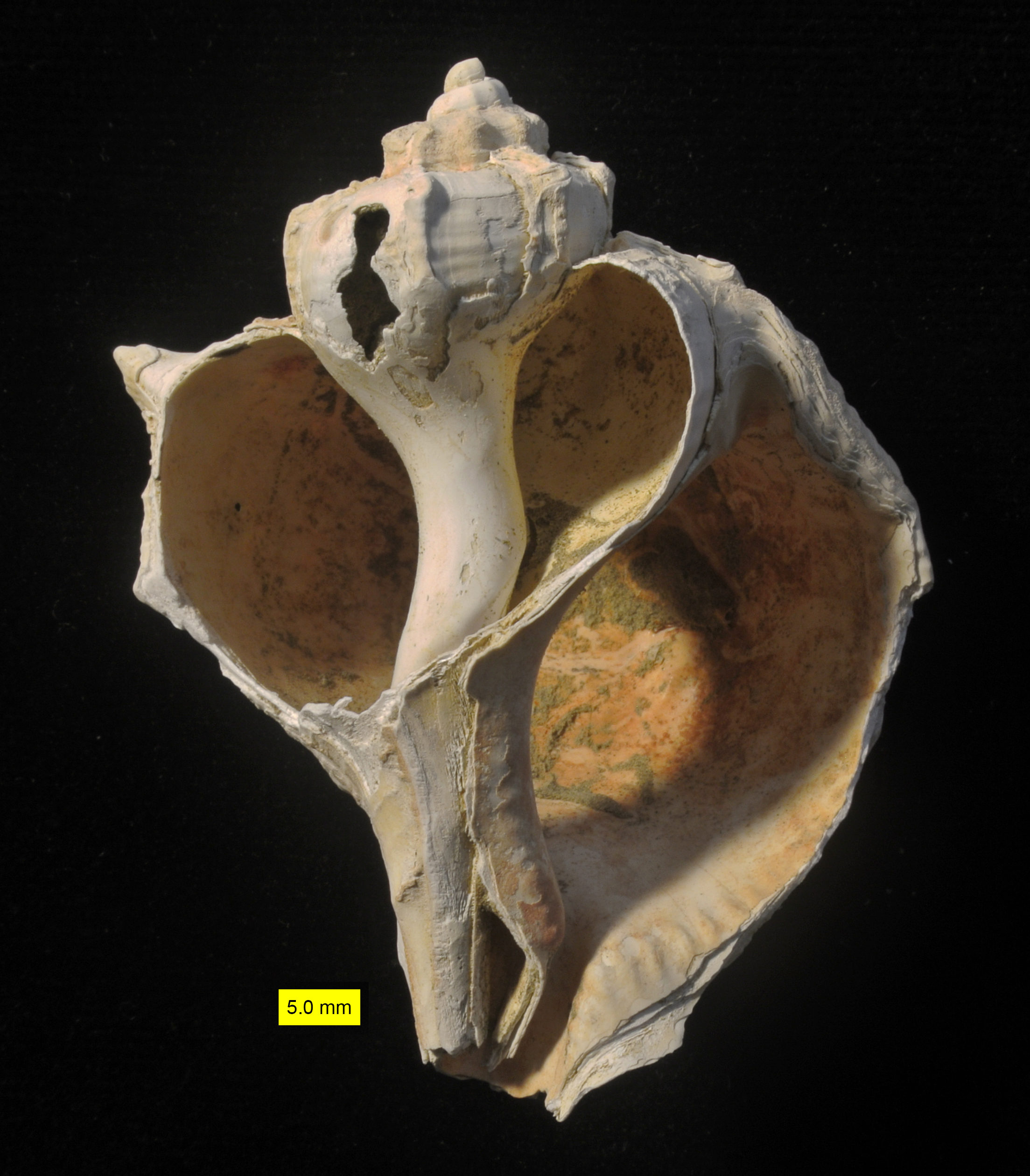
Bolinus brandaris from the Pliocene of Cyprus showing interior

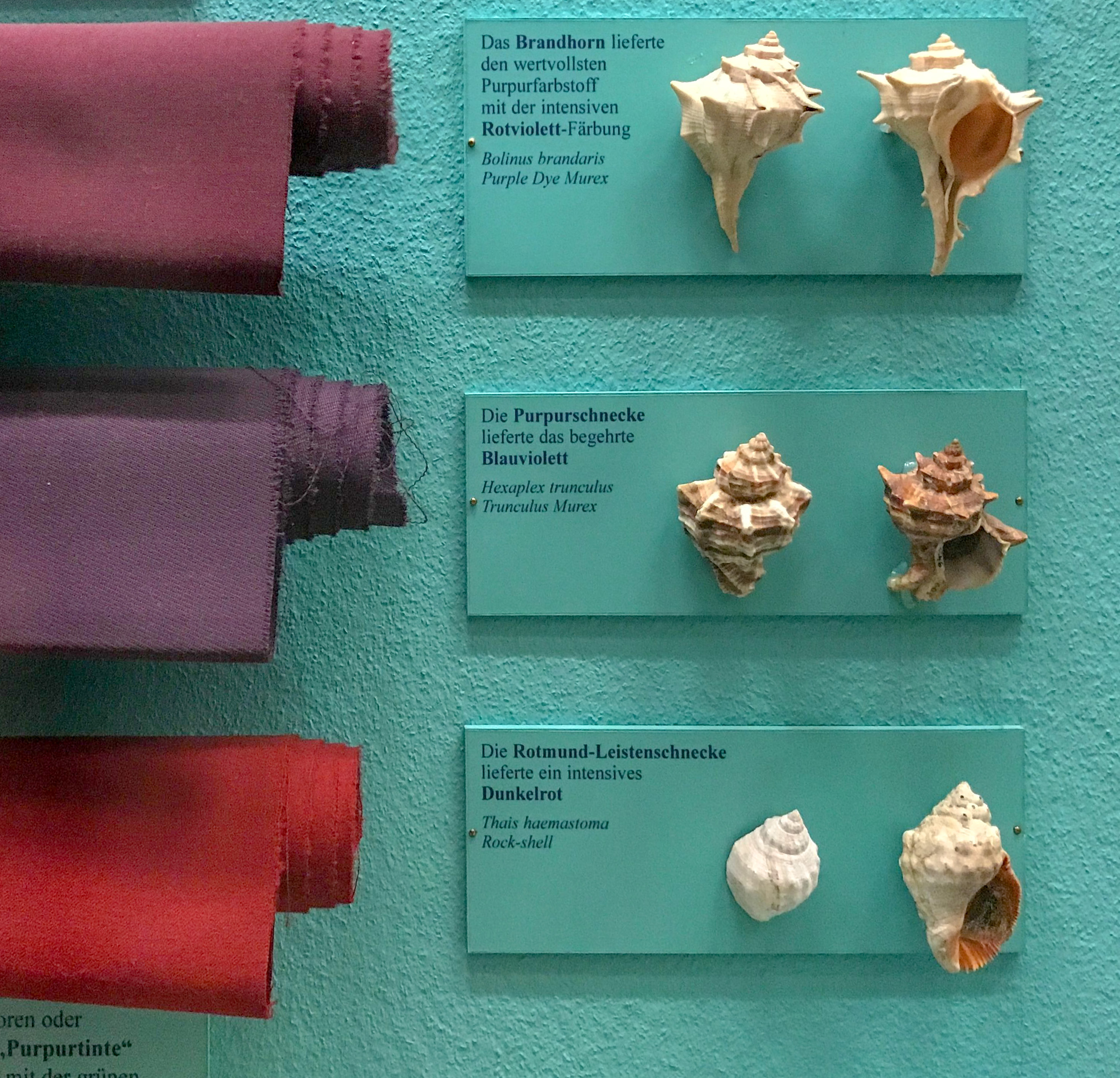
purple dyed fabric

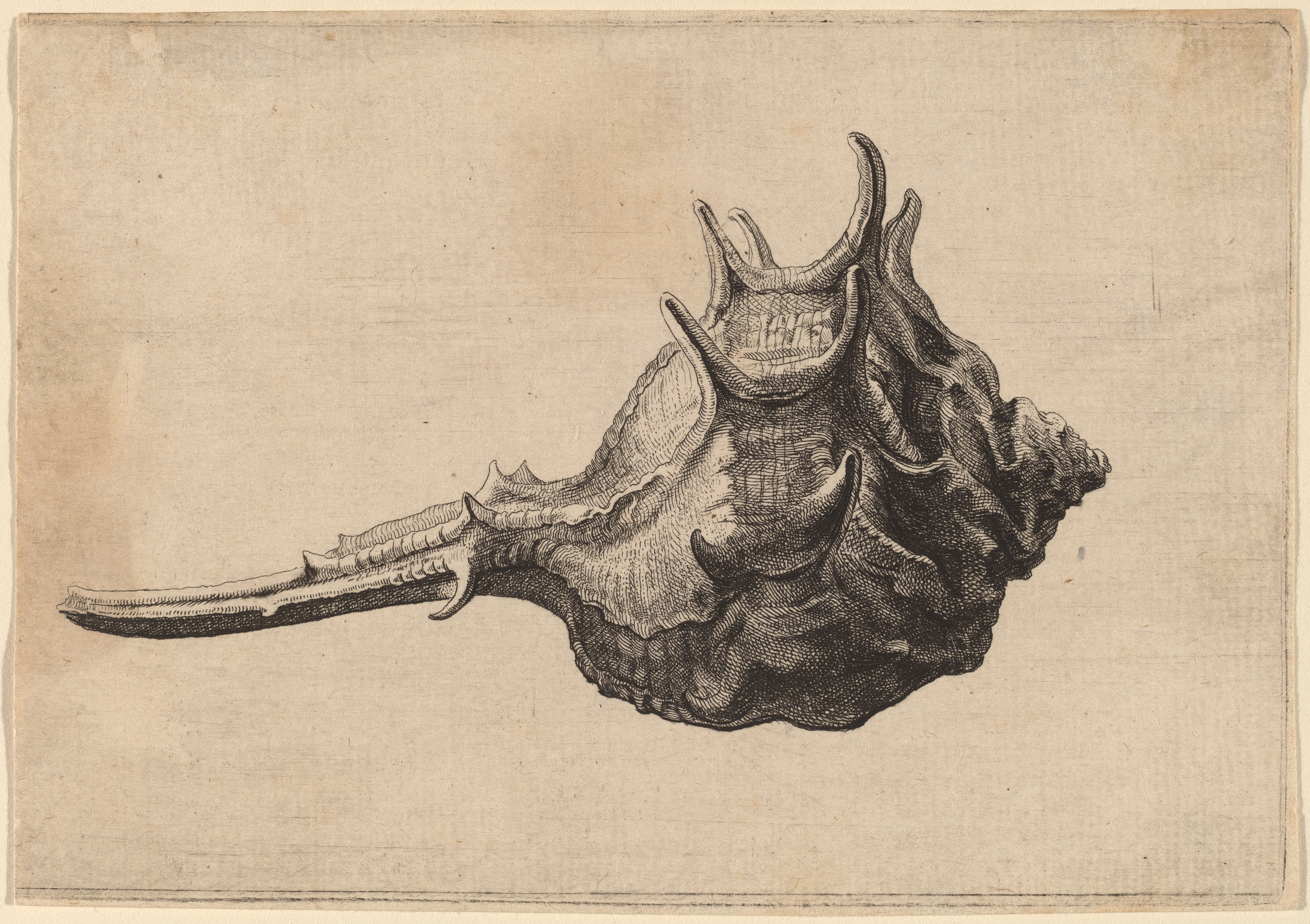
Wenceslaus Hollar, Shell (Murex brandaris), c. 1645, NGA 74805, National Gallery of Art

== Subspecies ==
These subspecific names are not accepted by ICZN.

- Bolinus brandaris bicauda - Coen 1933
- Bolinus brandaris coronatus x polii - Stigwan 2019
- Bolinus brandaris elongata - Stigwan 2019
- Bolinus brandaris cagliaritanus - Stigwan 2019
- Bolinus brandaris longispinus - Coen 1914
- Bolinus brandaris nasalis brevis - Stigwan 2019
- Bolinus brandaris nivea - Bucquoy, Dautzenberg & Dollfus, - 1882
- Bolinus brandaris polii - Coen 1933
- Bolinus brandaris rubiginosus - Stigwan 2019
- Bolinus brandaris trispinosus - Locard 1886
- Bolinus brandaris trituberculatus - Stigwan 2019
- Bolinus brandaris varicosus - Settepassi 1970

== Synonyms ==
- Aranea cinera Perry, 1811
- Haustellum clavatum Schumacher, 1817
- Murex brandariformis Locard, 1886
- Murex brandaris Linnaeus, 1758
- Murex brandaris brandellus Monterosato in Settepassi, 1970
- Murex brandaris brevispinus Settepassi, 1970
- Murex brandaris commixtus Settepassi, 1970
- Murex brandaris insculptus Settepassi, 1970
- Murex brandaris longiaculeatus Settepassi, 1970
- Murex brandaris ponderosus Settepassi, 1970
- Murex brandaris spinosus Settepassi, 1970
- Murex brandaris subcornutus Settepassi, 1970
- Murex brandaris var. aculeatus Philippi, 1836
- Murex brandaris var. canaliaspinosus Serradell, 1912
- Murex brandaris var. compacta Pallary, 1912
- Murex brandaris var. conica Serradell, 1912
- Murex brandaris var. delgadoi Serradell, 1912
- Murex brandaris var. devians Dautzenberg, 1904
- Murex brandaris var. diplacantha Dautzenberg, 1904
- Murex brandaris var. longispina Coen, 1914
- Murex brandaris var. monospinosus Serradell, 1912
- Murex brandaris var. multicostatus Serradell, 1912
- Murex brandaris var. nivea Bucquoy, Dautzenberg & Dollfus, 1882
- Murex brandaris var. novemcostatus Serradell, 1912
- Murex brandaris var. quadrispinosa Dautzenberg, 1904
- Murex brandaris var. robusta Dautzenberg, 1904
- Murex brandaris var. spinotuberculatus Serradell, 1912
- Murex brandaris var. spirocaudata Coen, 1934
- Murex brandaris var. ternispinosa Coen, 1914
- Murex brandaris var. torta Dautzenberg, 1904
- Murex brandaris var. trifariaspinosa Frauenfeld, 1869
- Murex brandaris var. trispinosa Bucquoy, Dautzenberg & Dollfus, 1882
- Murex brandaris var. tuberculata Hidalgo, 1890
- Murex brandaris var. tudiculoides Coen, 1934
- Murex brandaris varicosus Settepassi, 1970
- Murex clavaherculis Roding, 1798
- Murex coronatus Risso, 1826
- Murex trispinosus Locard, 1886
- Murex tuberculatus Roding, 1798
- Purpura fuliginosa Röding, 1798

== See also ==
- Tyrian purple
- Hexaplex trunculus
