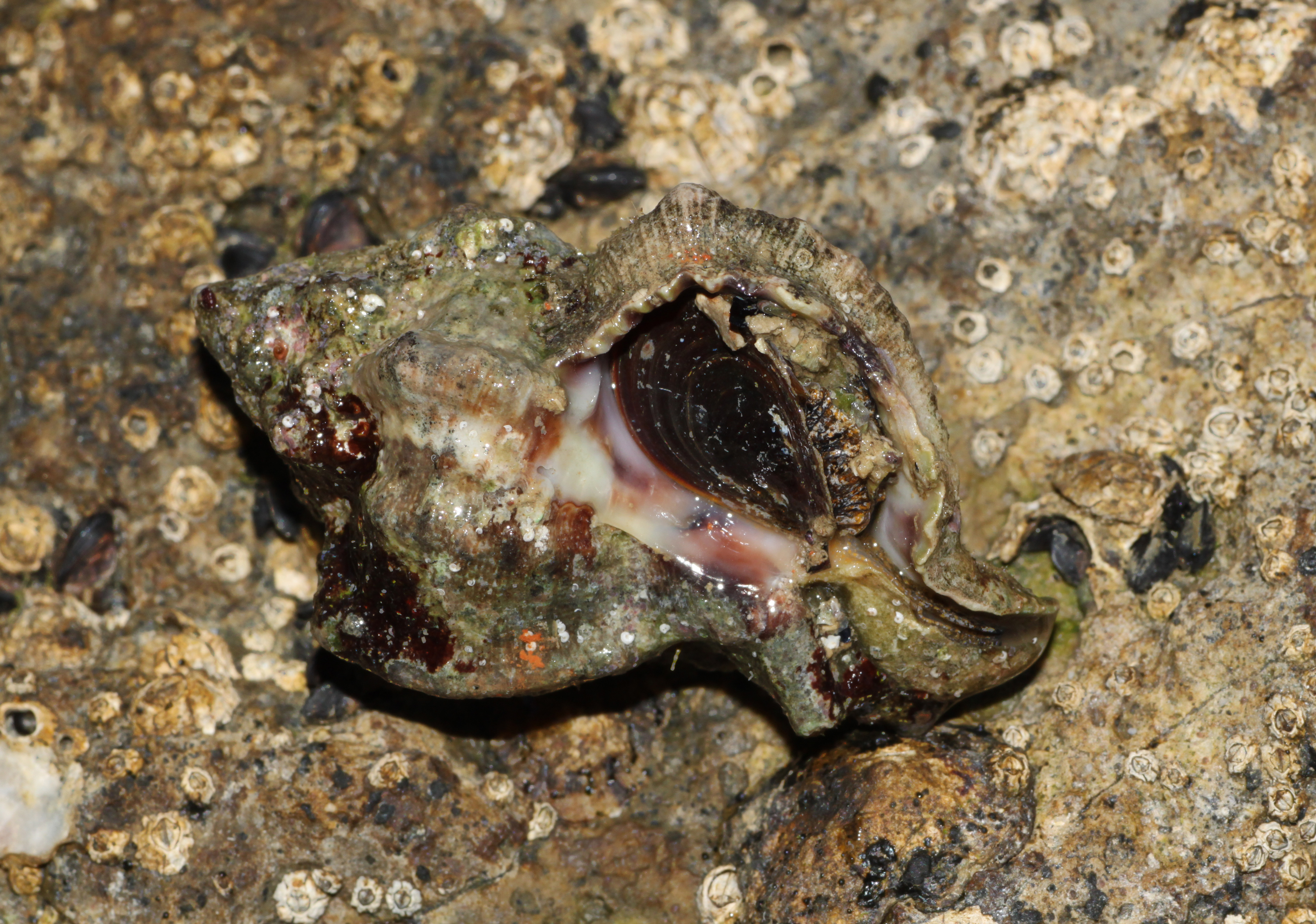

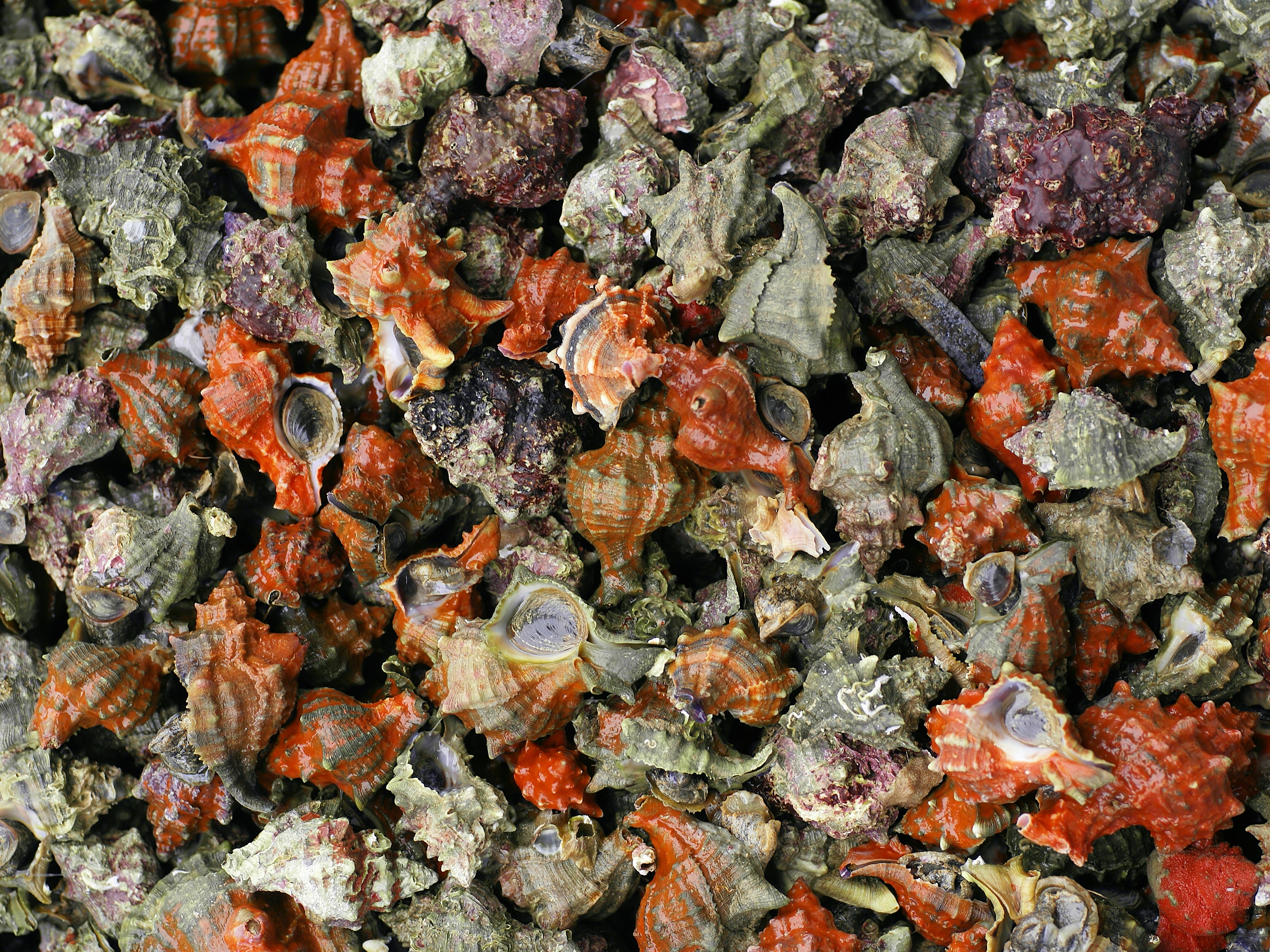

Scientific classification
- Kingdom: Animalia
- Phylum: Mollusca
- Class: Gastropoda
- Subclass: Caenogastropoda
- Order: Neogastropoda
- Family: Muricidae
- Genus: Hexaplex
- Subgenus: Trunculariopsis
- Species: H. trunculus

Binomial name
- Hexaplex trunculus (Linnaeus, 1758)
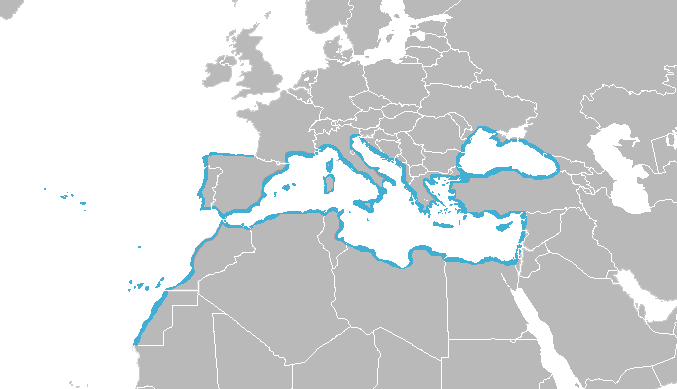
- Range of H. trunculus

Synonyms
- Hexaplex (Trunculariopsis) trunculus (Linnaeus, 1758)· accepted, alternate representation; Murex armigerus Settepassi, 1970 (not available, published in a work which does not consistently use binomial nomenclature (ICZN art. 11.4)); Murex coronatus Monterosato in Franceschini, 1906; Murex dumosus de Stefani, 1875; Murex falcatus Sandri & Danilo, 1856 (invalid: junior homonym of Murex falcatus G.B. Sowerby, 1834); Murex fasciatus Risso, 1826 (invalid: junior homonym of Murex fasciatus Gmelin, 1791); Murex gallica Dollfus, 1926; Murex gallicus Dollfus, 1923; Murex neomagensis Fontannes, 1879 (dubious synonym); Murex polygonulus Lamarck, 1822; Murex portulanus Monterosato in Franceschini, 1906; Murex ramulosus Risso, 1826; Murex rivalis Monterosato, 1923; Murex soldanii de Stefani, 1875; Murex soldanii meneghini de Stefani, 1875; Murex solidior Monterosato in Franceschini, 1906; Murex subasperrimus d'Orbigny, 1852; Murex taurinensis Bellardi & Sacco, 1872 (dubious synonym); Murex trunculus Linnaeus, 1758; Murex yoldii Mörch in Sowerby, 1879; Phyllanotus trunculus (Linnaeus, 1758); Polyplex purpurescens Perry, 1811; Truncularia trunculus (Linnaeus, 1758); Truncularia trunculus var. aspera Monterosato in Coen, 1933; Truncularia trunculus var. bulo Coen, 1933; Truncularia trunculus var. purpurifera Coen, 1933; Truncularia trunculus var. tetragona ^{Stalio in Coen, 1933} (infrasubspecific name, not accepted by ICZN); Trunculariopsis trunculus (Linnaeus, 1758)

= Hexaplex trunculus =

Hexaplex trunculus Temporal range: Pliocene – Recent

Species of gastropod

Hexaplex trunculus (previously known as Murex trunculus, Phyllonotus trunculus, or the banded dye-murex) is a medium-sized sea snail, a marine gastropod mollusc in the family Muricidae, the murex shells or rock snails. It is included in the subgenus Trunculariopsis.

This species is one of a group of opportunist predatory snails that are known to attack their prey in groups. Unlike some other sea snails, they show no preference for the size of their prey, regardless of their hunger levels.

The snail first appears in fossil records dating between the Pliocene and Quaternary periods (between 3.6 and 0.012 million years ago). Fossilised shells have been found in Morocco, Italy, and Spain.

This sea snail is historically important because its hypobranchial gland secretes a mucus used to create a distinctive purple-blue indigo dye. Ancient Mediterranean cultures, including the Minoans, Canaanites, Phoenicians and classical Greeks created dyes from the snails. One of the dye's main chemical ingredients is red dibromo-indigotin, the main component of Tyrian purple or tekhelet. The dye will turn indigo blue, similar to the colour of blue jeans, if exposed to sunlight before the dye sets.

== Subspecies ==
- Hexaplex trunculus trunculus (Linnaeus, 1758)

== Distribution ==
This species lives in the Mediterranean Sea and the Atlantic coasts of Europe and Africa, including Spain, Portugal, Morocco, the Canary Islands, Azores. This murex occurs in shallow, sublittoral waters.

== Shell description ==
Hexaplex trunculus has a broadly conical shell about 4 to 10 cm long. It has a rather high spire with seven angulated whorls, with the shell being formed similar to the shape of a fish. The shell is variable in sculpture and colour, with dark banding, in four varieties. The ribs sometimes develop thickenings or spines and give the shell a rough appearance. The shell is often covered in algae, which camouflages it, making it appear very similar to the seabed.

== Human use ==
Snail secretions were used as dye in ancient times. People still eat the snail in Spain and Portugal.

=== As ancient dye ===
The oldest known purple textiles were discovered in Syria, dating back to the early second millennium BCE. Among these findings are textiles from a burial site at Chagar Bazar, which date back to the 18th to 16th centuries BCE, as well as samples of preserved textiles found in gypsum at the Royal Palace of Qatna.

The ancient method for mass-producing blue dye from Hexaplex trunculus has not been reproduced successfully. Today, with stronger reduction agents that are more transparent, it is possible to break the original purplish hue of the molecule and degrade it by exposing it to UV light from the sun, resulting in a bluer colour. Therefore, archeologists have confirmed that Hexaplex trunculus is the species used to create the purple-blue dye. Large numbers of shells have been recovered from inside ancient live-storage chambers used for harvesting. Typically, 10,000 to 12,000 shells yielded only one gram of dye. Because of this, the dye was highly prized. Also known as "royal purple", it was prohibitively expensive and was only used by the highest-ranking aristocracy.

A similar dye, Tyrian purple, which is purple-red, was made from a related species of marine snail, Bolinus brandaris. This dye, alternatively known as imperial purple (see purple), was also prohibitively expensive.

Jews may have used the pigment from the shells to create a dye, tekhelet, to put on the tzitzit that the Torah specifies for the corner of the prayer shawl. This blue dye would have been made by taking the yellow dye solution and letting it sit in the sunlight, and then dipping the wool in it. This dye was lost to history until it was rediscovered by Otto Elsner, a professor at the Shenkar College of Engineering, Design and Art in Haifa. Since then, it has been reintroduced as the authentic tekhelet and has once again been reinstated to the Jewish garment, although only with limited acceptance.

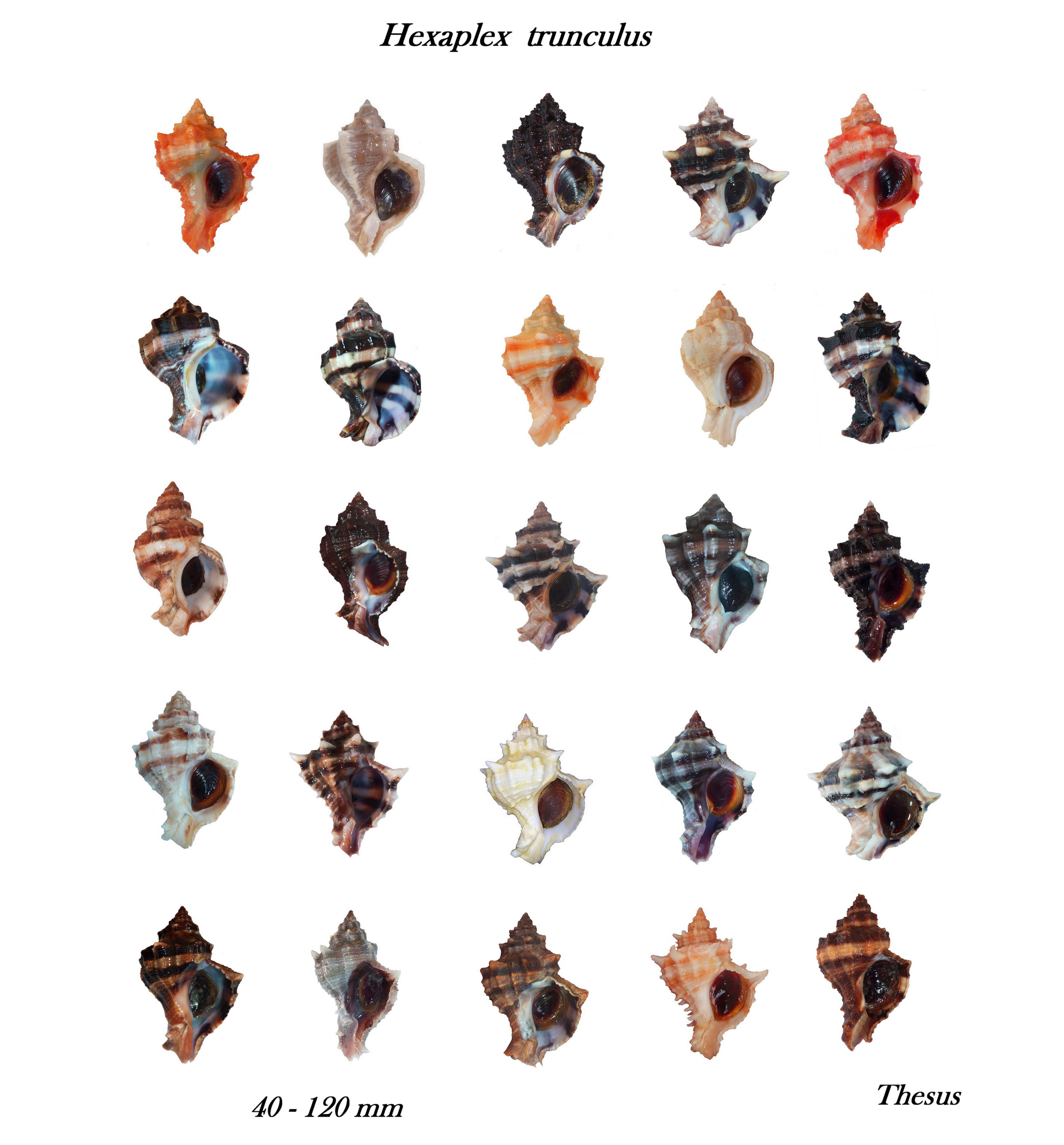
Compilations of commonly found species of Hexaplex trunculus

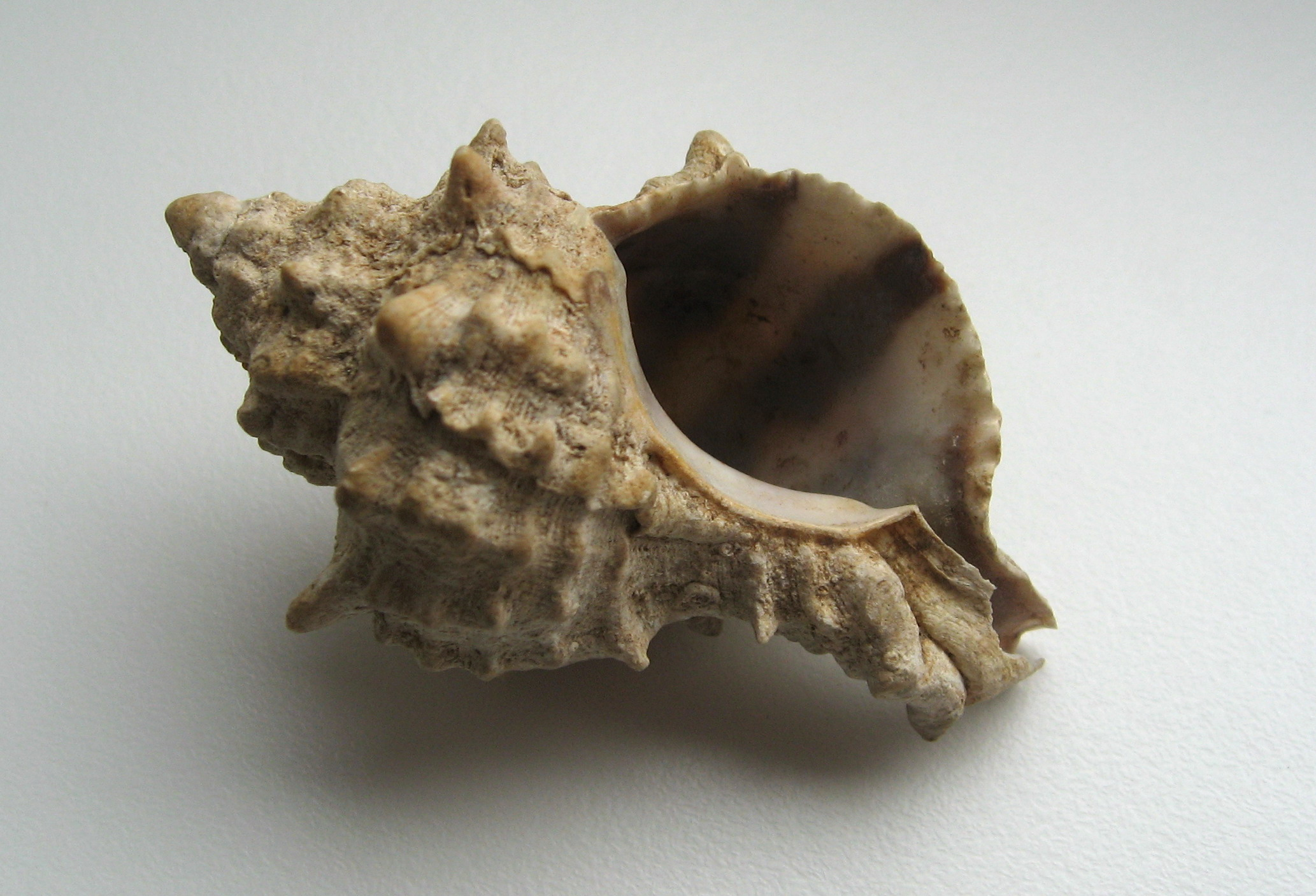
Apertural view of a shell

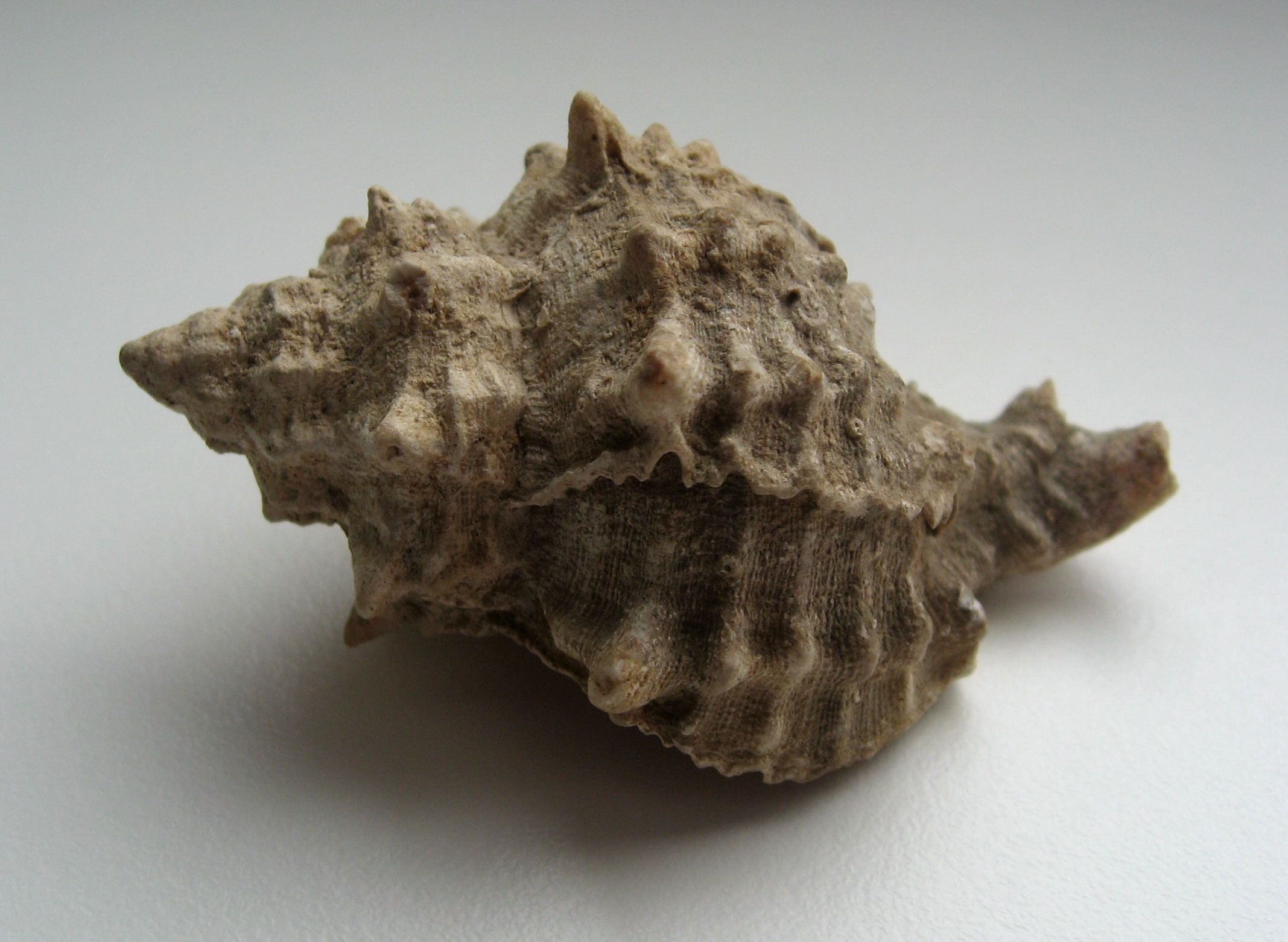
Dorsal view of a shell

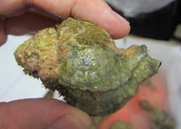
Hexaplex trunculus camouflaged in microalgae

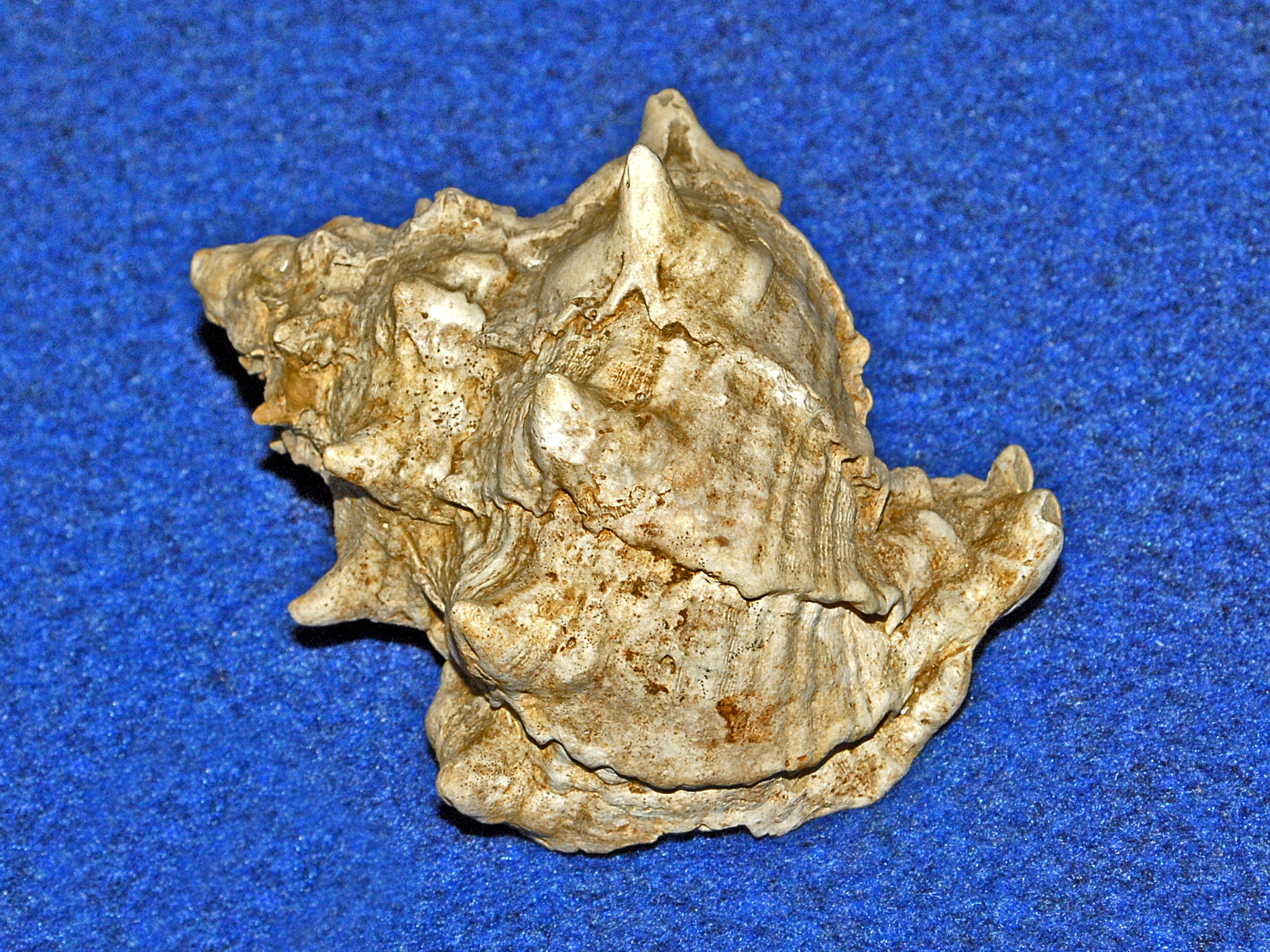
Fossil shell of Hexaplex trunculus conglobatus from Pliocene

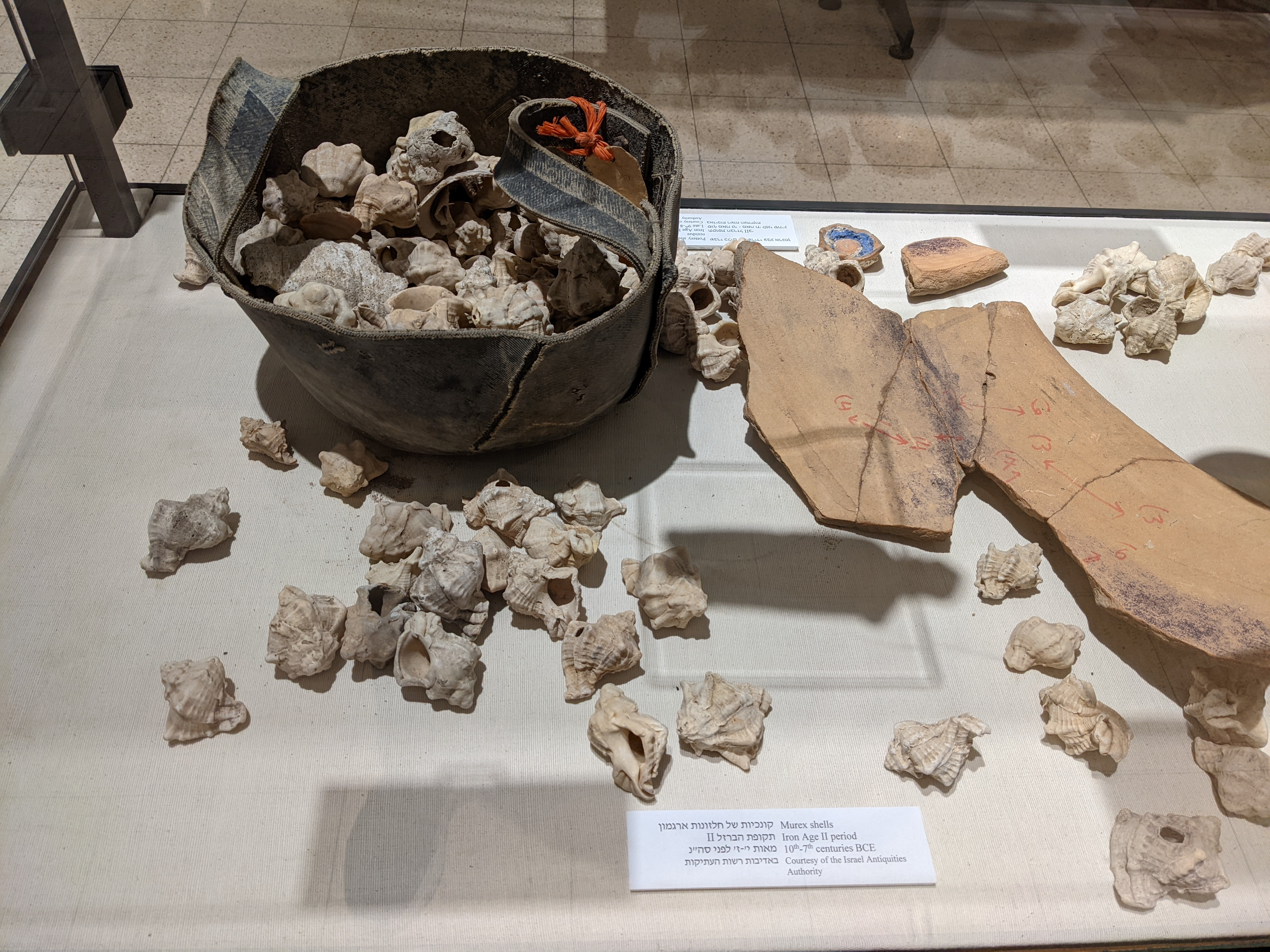
Murex shells from the Iron Age II period (10th–7th centuries BCE) with ancient remains of purple on the shards seen on the right

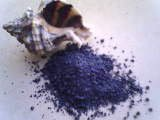
Carthaginian murex pigment from Tunisia

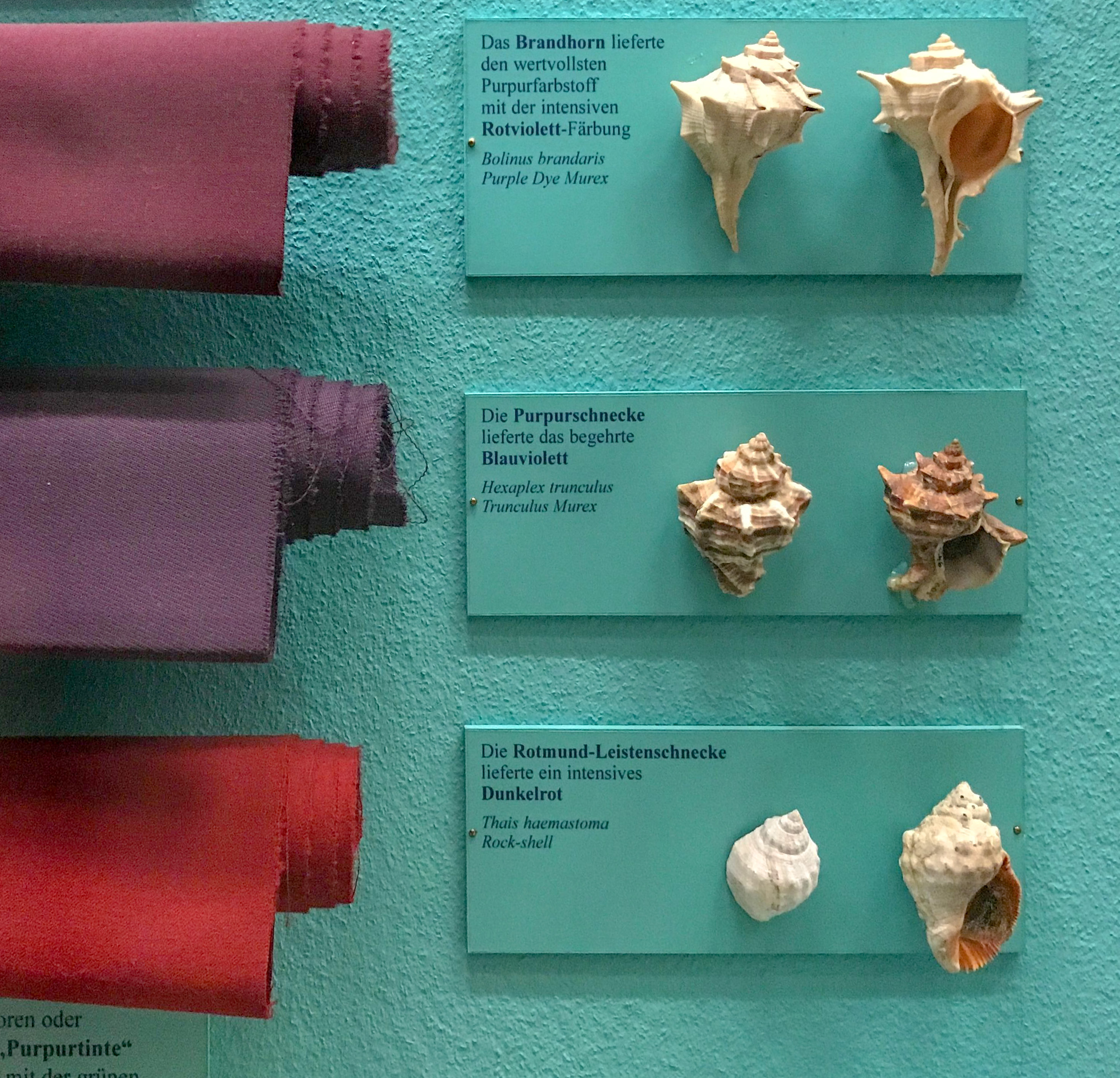
Purple dyed fabric
