= Libercsey family =

Hungarian noble family

House of Libercsey
- Country: Kingdom of Hungary
- Founded: 14th century
- Final ruler: Mihály II
- Dissolution: 1670

Libercsey or Libercsei was a noble family in the Kingdom of Hungary, which first appeared in the 14th century and had estates and villages mostly in Nógrád and Hont Counties.

== History ==
The Libercsey de Kislibercse family came from Nógrád County, its ancient estates laid in Kislibercse (today Ľuboriečka, Slovakia). Its origin traced back to the 14th century. It is possible that they were relatives to the Tompos de Libercse and Radó de Libercse families, both descendants of the Falkos branch of the gens Kacsics, who owned the adjacent Nagylibercse estate (today Ľuboreč, Slovakia). The family was only sporadically mentioned by contemporary medieval records. In 1379, a certain János, son of Demeter owned a part of Szelény (today Seľany, Slovakia) through his wife Klára Szelényi. However, in 1383, the local Kóváry and Csalomiai families banned him to own the land. His daughter Margit married Italian-born burgher James the Saracen, who served as ispán to collect thirtieth (Hungarian: harmincadispán) in the 1390s, alongside Francesco Bernardi. In 1389, János protested against that his son-in-law tried to estrange the land of Sirák (today Širákov, Slovakia) from the family property.

In 1437, Simon was mentioned as vice-ispán of Hont County in early 1437. In 1497, a certain János was a landowner in Ipolykeszi (today Kosihy nad Ipľom, Slovakia), while his relative Pál owned a part of Keszihóc (today Kosihovce, Slovakia). In 1507, Pál also became one of the landowners in Apáti (today a borough in Opatovská Nová Ves, Slovakia). In 1533, a certain Péter Libercsey was mentioned by a document. In the middle of the 16th century, Pál Libercsey married Julianna Madách. They had two children, Katalin and Mihály I. The latter one was a civil servant in Nógrád County since 1599. He served as chief magistrate (Hungarian: főszolgabíró) for a decade in the county (possibly in Gács district) until his death in 1637. He had eleven children, including Mihály II, who became captain of Gács Castle (today in Halič, Slovakia), an important fortress of the Hungarian border system against the Ottoman Empire. Although he had ten children from his first wife Zsófia Földváry, his sons predeceased him, thus he was the last male member of the family, when he died in January 1670. His daughter Anna was the last person who bore the Libercsey surname when she died in 1713.

== Selected family tree ==
The family tree is based on Mihály II Libercsey's birth diary which traced back to his paternal grandparents, Pál Libercsey and Julianna Madách.

- Pál I, married Julianna Madách
  - Katalin, married Mihály Zolnay (fl. 1618), they had four children, including Ábrahám
  - Mihály I (d. 1637), married Zsuzsanna Darvas (d. 1657). He served as chief magistrate of a district in Nógrád County
    - Fruzsina (1607–1643), married Gergely Battik (d. 1639) in 1623
    - Anna (1608–1663), married Mátyás Gedey (d. 1664), then István Székely, then Ferenc Domanik
    - Julianna (1609–1653), married András Szilassy (d. 1649) in 1633
    - Mihály II (1612–1670), married Zsófia Földváry (d. 1665) in 1638, then Anna Aranyady (d. 1677) in 1667. He served as vice-ispán of Nógrád County from 1659 to 1666, and captain of Divény, then Gács Castles; last male member
      - (1st) Gábor (1639–1649)
      - (1st) Zsuzsanna (1641–1696 or 1697), married György Bezegh (executed in 1687) in 1656
      - (1st) Borbála (1643–1652)
      - (1st) Anna (1645–1713), married János Madách (d. 1669) in 1664, then János Dobay. She was the last person who bore the Libercsey surname
      - (1st) Krisztina (1649–1651)
      - (1st) Mária (1651–1653)
      - (1st) Rozina (1656–1702), married Gáspár Ráday (d. 1711), their son was Chancellor Pál Ráday
      - (1st) Magdolna (1658–?), married István Dacsó
      - (1st) a son, died infant
      - (1st) Tamás (b. and d. 1662)
    - a son, died infant
    - Pál II (1615–1645). He served as steward of Count Ádám Forgách
    - Judit, died at the age of six
    - Erzsébet (1620–c.1701), married András Ráday in 1643, then Pál Némethy
    - Ferenc (1622–1661), married Erzsébet Balogh in 1661. He served as notary of Heves and Hont Counties
    - a son, died infant
    - Judit (1628–?), married István Gyürky in 1646

== Sources ==
- Bakács, István (1971). Hont vármegye Mohács előtt [Hont County Before the Battle of Mohács] (in Hungarian). Akadémiai Kiadó.
- Dümmerth, Dezső (1982). "A magyar köznemesi társadalom élettörténetéből : a Tetétleni–Földváry família sorsa és birtoklása az Árpád-kortól a XIX. század küszöbéig". Levéltári Közlemények. 53 (2). National Archives of Hungary: 207–260.
- Engel, Pál (1996). Magyarország világi archontológiája, 1301–1457, I [Secular Archontology of Hungary, 1301–1457, Volume I] (in Hungarian). História, MTA Történettudományi Intézete. ISBN 963-8312-44-0.
- Iványi, Emma (1984). "Egy XVII. századi várkapitány (Libercsey Mihály, 1612–1670) [A 17th-Century Castellan (Mihály Libercsey, 1612–1670)]". In H. Balázs, Éva; Fügedi, Erik; Maksay, Ferenc (eds.). Mályusz Elemér emlékkönyv. Társadalom- és művelődéstörténeti tanulmányok (in Hungarian). Akadémiai Kiadó. pp. 173–187. ISBN 963-05-3272-7.
