= Sirakov =

Sirakov may refer to:

- Širákov, a village and municipality in southern Slovakia
- Sirákov, a village and municipality in the Czech Republic
- Sirakov (surname)
