= István Chernel =

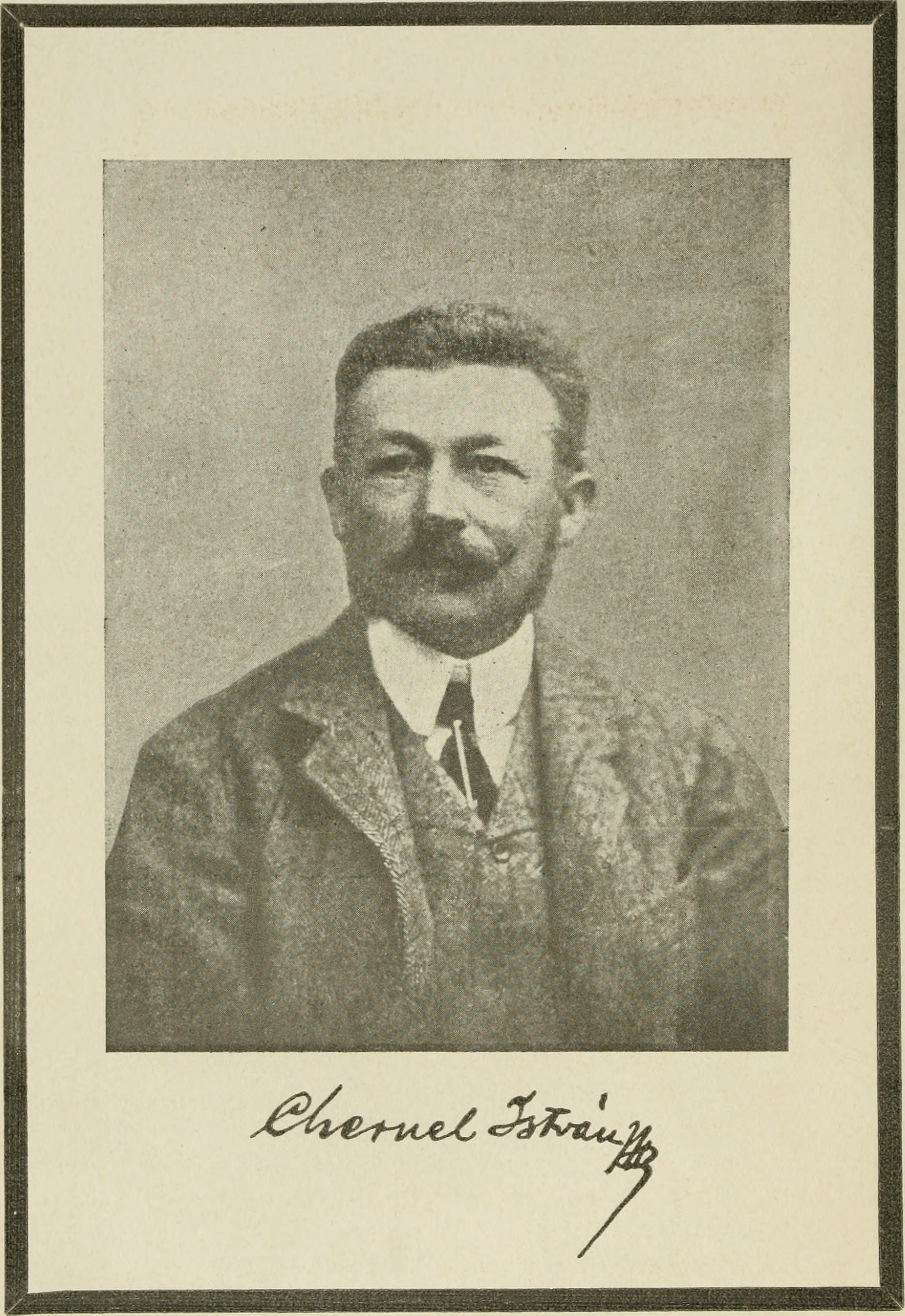

István Chernel (31 May 1865 – 21 February 1922) was a noble Hungarian naturalist, ornithologist and conservationist. He documented the birdlife of Hungary and established a national bird and tree day on the 10th of May.

== Life and work ==
Chernel was born in Kőszeg, son of the historian Kálmán from Chernelházi and Mária Tolnai Festetich from Tolna who both came from noble families. His maternal great-grandfather was Count Imre Festetics. At school, he learned to skin birds from István Fászl and he recorded ornithological observations from the age of twelve. Kálmán Chernel had an interest in natural history and in 1880, at the 21st meeting of Hungarian physicians and naturalists in Szombathely, he spoke on the migration of birds. His son was also present. His parents however thought he should choose a career in public administration and Chernel studied at the University of Bratislava and then at the University of Budapest where he graduated in law in 1888. He then worked in Sopron in the government briefly before resigning and taking up ornithology. This change was influenced by a meeting with Herman Otto in 1887. In 1890 he travelled into Norway along with his wife Dórá Rótth and after learning to ski was involved in introducing skiing into Hungary. In 1891 he was involved in organizing the International Ornithology Congress in Budapest. He began to study the birds of Hanság, the reeds of Lake Velence, and the Danube floodplain. While studying birds in Lake Velence, he also took an interest in the local dialect and wrote on it. He published a list of the birds of the Hungarian Empire in 1898. His sister Sarolta (1868–1953) married Baron Kálmán Miske (1860–1943) who was a museologist and a founder of the Vasvár County Museum. Here István helped establish a natural history collection with specimens of the birds of the region. After the death of Herman Otto, he headed the Hungarian ornithological centre from 1916 with Titusz Csörgey as a deputy director. In 1902 he served as vice-president of the National Animal Protection Association, setting up a branch in Kőszeg. He also organized the first of an annual day of birds and trees on the 10th of May. His travels into the cold and wet marshlands led to an illness. He suffered from complications during the Spanish flu epidemic and died from pneumonia a few years later.
