= János Salamon Petényi =

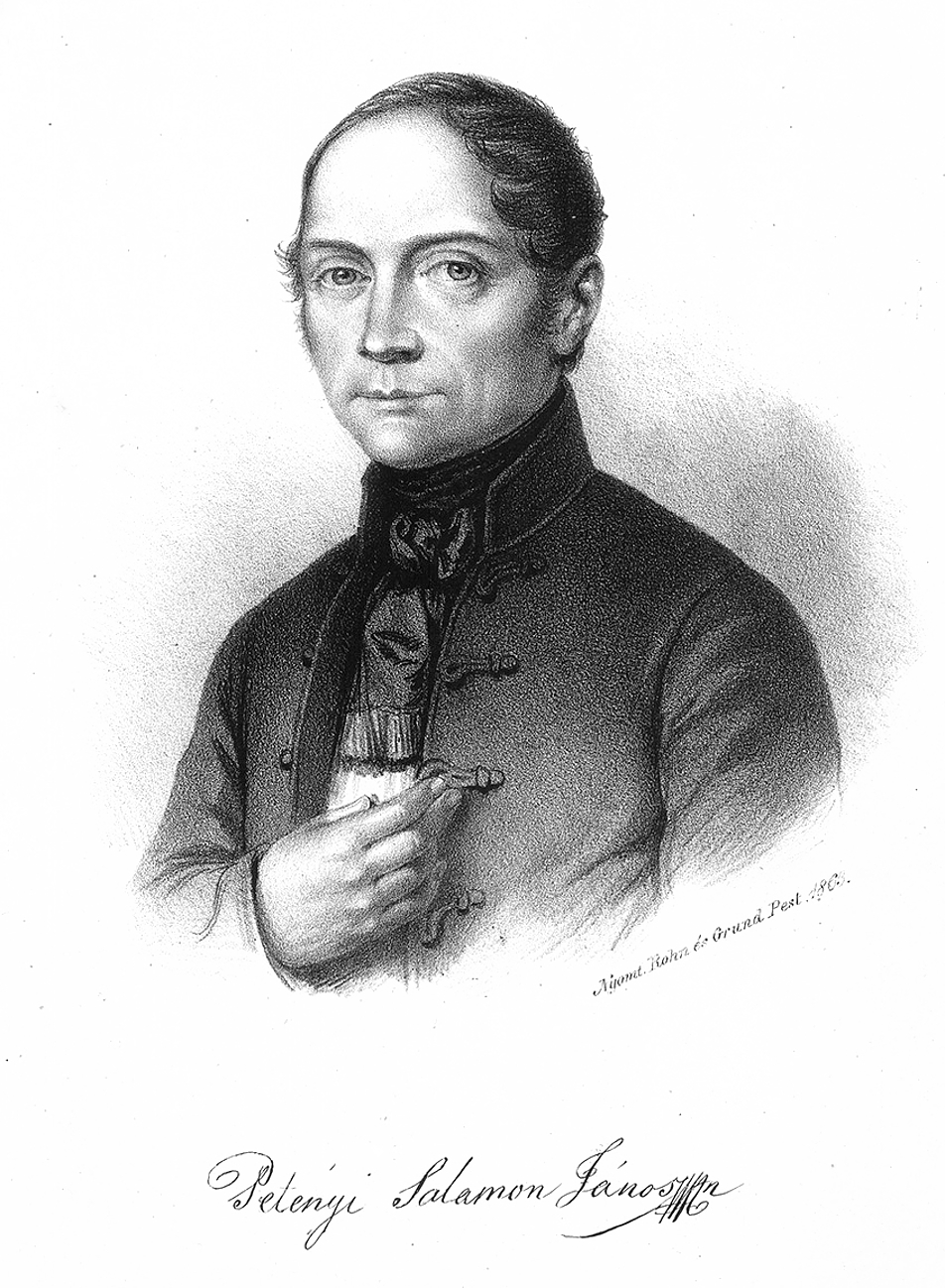

János Salamon Petényi, Johann Salomon von Petényi or Ján Šalamún Petian (30 July 1799 – 5 October 1855) was a Hungarian priest who took an interest in zoology, travelling, collecting specimens, and contributing to ornithology, speleology, and paleontology. He is considered the father of Hungarian ornithology.

== Life and work ==
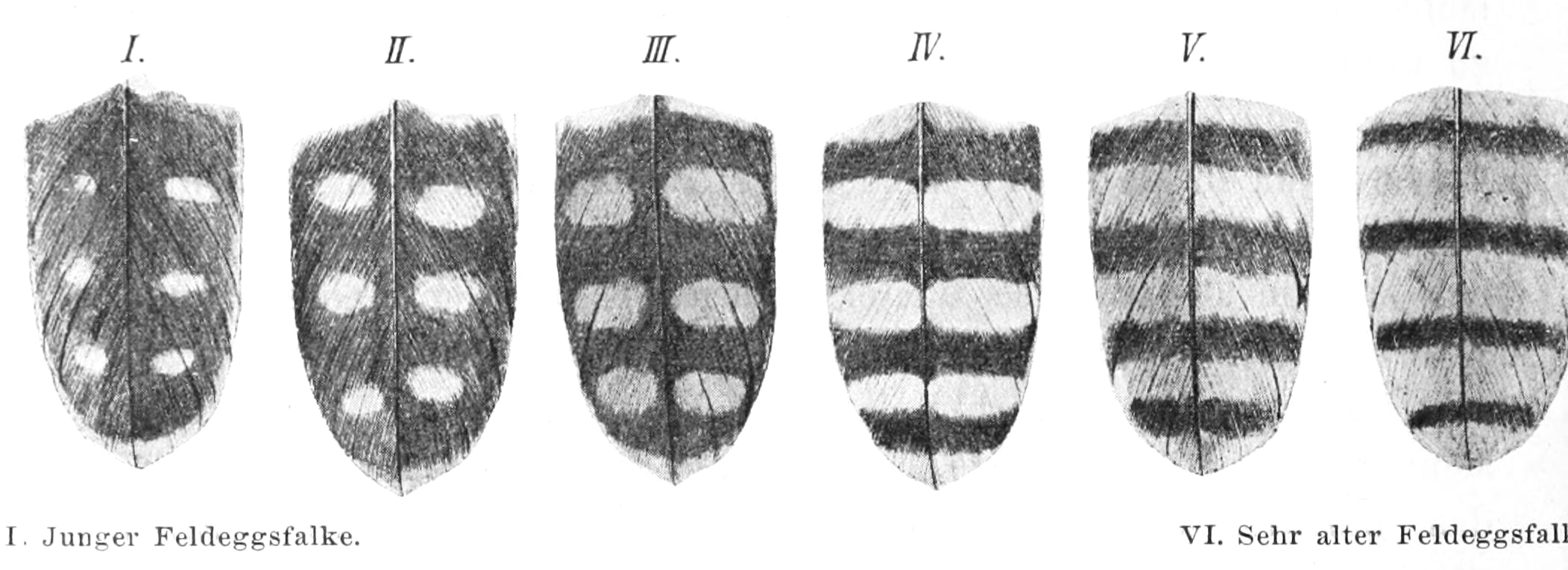
Age and feather patterning in Falco biarmicus described by Petenyi

Petényi was born in Ábelfalva, Nógrád megye where his father was Lutheran pastor Gábor Petényi who was known for his work in orientalism. Schooled in Losonc and Selmec he took an interest in collecting objects of natural history. He also influenced Agoston Kubinyi. He followed the family tradition to become a pastor, studying in Bratislava and Vienna while also attending the botanical lectures of Nikolaus Joseph von Jacquin, meeting Johann Jakob Heckel and Johann Natterer from whom he learned taxidermy and specimen preparation. He corresponded with Christian Ludwig Brehm and Johann Friedrich Naumann and in 1826 became a pastor in Czinkota. In 1833 he moved to Pest and in 1834 he became curator of the zoological collections at the Hungarian National Museum. Around 1840 Gustav Hartlaub visited Petényi and for unknown reasons Hartlaub developed a dislike for Petényi. In 1847 he examined fossilized remains in the karst of Beremend. He also examined caves in the Bihor Mountains. He was elected to the Hungarian Academy of Sciences in 1846. Accidental absorption and toxicity from arsenic soap used as a preservative in his taxidermy work led to his early death. His main work on birds was completed and translated to German from his manuscripts by Titus Csörgey with a biographical preface by Otto Herman.

== Eponymy ==
Many species of fossil and extant animals have been named after him including:

- Prodeinotherium petenyii,
- The Romanian barbel fish Barbus petenyi,
- Villanyia petenyii, and
- The extinct Vole, Mimomys petenyii.
