= List of works by Tivadar Csontváry Kosztka =

List of works, by Tivadar Csontváry Kosztka

This is an incomplete list of works, by Tivadar Csontváry Kosztka.

Image	Title	Year	Medium	Dimensions	Owner
	Woman Sitting by the Window	Circa 1890	oil on canvas	73 × 95 cm	Hungarian National Gallery, Budapest
	Storm	Circa 1890	Oil on canvas	61 × 94 cm	
	Detail of a Park	Circa 1891	Oil on canvas	51 × 78 cm	Private collection
	Butterflies	1893	Oil on cardboard		Janus Pannonius Museum, Pécs
	Bird of Prey	1893	Oil on cardboard	54 × 44 cm	Janus Pannonius Museum, Pécs
	Heron	1893	Oil on cardboard		Nógrád Museum, Losonc
	Nine-killer	1893	Oil on cardboard		Janus Pannonius Museum, Pécs
	Eurasian jay	1893	Oil on cardboard	47 × 31 cm	Janus Pannonius Museum, Pécs
	Hawk with ptarmigan	1893	Oil on cardboard		Janus Pannonius Museum, Pécs
	Deer	1893	Oil on canvas	100 × 120 cm	Private collection
	Self-portrait	Circa 1893	Oil on canvas	55,5 × 45,5 cm	Hungarian National Gallery, Budapest
	Forgach castle in Gács	1894	?	37 × 95 cm	Antal-Lusztig Collection, Debrecen
	Old lady peeling an apple	Circa 1894	Oil on canvas	126 × 141 cm	Janus Pannonius Museum, Pécs
	Child in red	Circa 1894	Oil on cardboard		Private collection
	Highland Street	1895	Oil on cardboard	38 × 51 cm	Janus Pannonius Museum, Pécs
	Italian landscape	1895			Private collection
	Ancient vault	1896 után	Oil on canvas		
	Pompeji Have, House of the Chirurgus with the Vesuv	1897-98	Oil on canvas	47 × 51 cm	Private collection
	Sun Looking back at Trau	1898	Oil on canvas	70 × 95 cm	Private collection
	Young Painter	1898	Oil on canvas	38,5 × 29 cm	Hungarian National Gallery, Budapest
	School memory from Paris	Circa 1898	Oil on canvas	70 × 95 cm	Private collection
	View of Trau	1899	Oil on canvas	34,5 × 66,5 cm	Private collection
	Moonlight at Trau	1899	Oil on canvas	33 × 65 cm	Private collection
	Storm in Trau	1900	Oil on canvas		Antal-Lusztig Collection, Debrecen
	Little plein air in Trau	1900	Oil on canvas	25 × 48 cm	
	Self-portrait	Circa 1900	Oil on canvas	67 × 39,5 cm	Hungarian National Gallery, Budapest
	Praying old woman	1900	Oil on canvas	60.7 × 49 cm	Slovak National Gallery, Bratislava
	Tennis party	Circa 1900	Oil on canvas	41 × 40,2 cm	Private collection
	Dalmat landscape	1900	Oil on canvas		Private collection
	Dalmat Hill	Circa 1900	Oil on cardboard	28 × 34 cm	Janus Pannonius Museum, Pécs
	Mountain bridge over the river	Circa 1900	Oil on canvas	50,5 × 34 cm	Private collection
	Villa Pompeji	1901	Oil on canvas		Private collection
	Sunset in Napoli bay	1901	Oil on canvas	31 × 50 cm	Private collection
	Fishing in Castellamare	1901	Oil on canvas	55 × 95 cm	Janus Pannonius Museum, Pécs
	Night in Castellamare	1901			Private collection
	Palazzo Corvaia in Taormina (Italian fisherman)	1901	Oil on canvas		Private collection?
	Italian town (Taormina with the clock tower)	1901	Oil on canvas		Private collection?
	Company passing through a bridge	1901	Oil on canvas	60 × 72 cm	Private collection
	Blossoming Almonds	1901-02	Oil on canvas	43 × 51,5 cm	Ottó Herman Museum, Miskolc
	Full Moon at Taormina	1901	Oil on canvas		
	Castellamare di Stabia	1902	Oil on canvas	101 × 120 cm	Janus Pannonius Museum, Pécs
	Panorama of Selmecbánya	1902	Oil on canvas	90 × 152 cm	Janus Pannonius Museum, Pécs
	Eastern Station of Budapest by night	1902	Oil on canvas	44 × 65 cm	Ottó Herman Museum, Miskolc
	Old Fisherman	1902	Oil on canvas	59,5 × 45 cm	Ottó Herman Museum, Miskolc
	Little town on hillside	Circa 1902	Oil on canvas	50 × 65 cm	Private collection
	own at the Seashore	Circa 1902	Oil on canvas	43,3 × 114 cm	Hungarian National Gallery, Budapest
	Blossoming Almonds in Taormina	Circa 1902	Oil on canvas	79,5 × 98 cm	Janus Pannonius Museum, Pécs
	Lovers	1902	Oil on canvas		Private collection
	Rendez-vous of Lovers	Circa 1902	Oil on canvas	69,2 × 54,2 cm	Private collection
	Landscape at moonlight	Circa 1903	Oil on canvas	34,2 × 24,2 cm	Unknown (Stolen)
	Zrinyi Launches the Final Attack	1903	Oil on canvas	82 × 131 cm	Janus Pannonius Museum, Pécs
	Waterfall at Jajce	1903	Oil on canvas	97 × 149 cm	Janus Pannonius Museum, Pécs
	Lighted trees in Jajce	1903	Oil on canvas	92 × 88 cm	Hungarian National Gallery, Budapest
	Jajce power plant at night	1903	Oil on canvas	80,5 × 126 cm	Private collection
	The Saviour praying	1903	Oil on canvas	126 × 80.5 cm	Janus Pannonius Museum, Pécs
	Shipwreck	1903	Oil on canvas	57 × 75 cm	Private collection
	Storm at Hortobágy	1903	Oil on canvas	59 × 117 cm	Janus Pannonius Museum, Pécs
	Roman Bridge at Mostar	1903	Oil on canvas	92 × 185 cm	Janus Pannonius Museum, Pécs
	Springtime in Mostar	1903	Oil on canvas	69 × 91 cm	Janus Pannonius Museum, Pécs
	Waterfall at Schaffhausen	1903	Oil on canvas	130 × 228 cm	Hungarian National Gallery, Budapest
	Secret Island	1903	Oil on canvas	35 × 50 cm	Kovács Gábor Gyűjtemény
	At the Entrance of the Wailing-Wall in Jerusalem	1904	Oil on canvas	205 × 293 cm	Janus Pannonius Museum, Pécs (letét)
	Ruins of the Jupiter Temple in Athens	1904	Oil on canvas	67,5 × 137,5 cm	Janus Pannonius Museum, Pécs
	Street in Athen	1904	Oil on canvas	102 × 90 cm	Hungarian National Gallery, Budapest
	Small Taormina	1904	Oil on canvas	70 × 98,5 cm	Hungarian National Gallery, Budapest
	Ruins of the Greek Theatre in Taormina	1904-05	Oil on canvas	302 × 570 cm	Hungarian National Gallery, Budapest
	The Staroleśna Valley in the Tatras	1904-05	Oil on canvas	236 × 400 cm	Hungarian National Gallery, Budapest
	Coaching in Athens at New Moon	1904	Oil on canvas	92,5 × 70 cm	Janus Pannonius Museum, Pécs
	Oblation	1904	Oil on canvas	92,5 × 70 cm	Private collection
	Greek seashore	Circa 1890?	Oil on canvas	29 × 39 cm	Private collection
	Fortress with camels and Arabians	1904	Oil on canvas	87,5 × 140 cm	Private collection
	View of the Dead Sea from the Temple Square in Jerusalem	1905	Oil on canvas	127 × 262 cm	Janus Pannonius Museum, Pécs
	The Mount of Olives in Jerusalem	1905	Oil on canvas	118 × 115 cm	Janus Pannonius Museum, Pécs
	Baalbek	1906	Oil on canvas	385 × 714,5 cm	Janus Pannonius Museum, Pécs (letét)
	Small Baalbek	Circa 1906?	Oil on canvas	?	?
	Sacrificial Stone in Baalbek	1906-07	Oil on canvas	110 × 130,5 cm	Private collection
	Lone cedar	1907	Oil on canvas	194 × 248 cm	Janus Pannonius Museum, Pécs
	Pilgrimage to the Cedars of Lebanon	1907	Oil on canvas	200 × 205 cm	Hungarian National Gallery, Budapest
	Maroccan teacher	1908	Oil on canvas	75 × 65 cm	Janus Pannonius Museum, Pécs
	Maria's well in Nazareth	1908	Oil on canvas	362 × 515 cm	Janus Pannonius Museum, Pécs (letét)
	Riding on the seashore	1909	Oil on canvas	72 × 171,5 cm	Janus Pannonius Museum, Pécs
	Antique Madonna	Circa 1894	Oil on canvas		Unknown
	Antique József	Circa 1894	Oil on canvas		Unknown
	School memories from Karlsruhe	Circa 1894	Oil on canvas		Unknown
	Hollande	1895	Oil on canvas		Unknown
	Pompei yard	Circa 1897	Oil on canvas		Unknown
	Pompeji (sketch)	Circa 1897	Oil on canvas		Unknown
	Smoking Etna	Circa 1901	Oil on canvas	39 × 56 cm	Unknown
	A Night in Chairo	Between 1901 and 1902	Oil on canvas		Unknown
	Woman with lilies	Circa 1902	Oil on canvas	61 × 76 cm	Unknown
	Hunyadi in the beatle of Nándorfehérvár	1903	Oil on canvas		Unknown
	Hungarian bevy	1903	Oil on canvas	54 × 61 cm	Unknown
	Turkish bevy	1903	Oil on canvas	58 × 63 cm	Unknown
	Passion part I	1903	Oil on canvas	61 × 53 cm	Unknown
	Passion part II	1903	Oil on canvas	61 × 61 cm	Unknown
	Preaching monk	Circa 1903	Oil on canvas		Unknown
	Waterfall of Kerka	1903	Oil on canvas		Unknown
	Moses at the hill of Sina	1903	Oil on canvas		Unknown
	Sunset in the Sahara	1904	Oil on canvas		Unknown
	Temple Jupiter at Baalbek	1904	Oil on canvas	60 × 171 cm	Unknown
	Broken obelisk	1906	Oil on canvas	70 × 116 cm	Unknown
	Palestinian tomb	1906	Oil on canvas		Unknown
