= Paradrymadusa =

Scientific classification
- Domain: Eukaryota
- Kingdom: Animalia
- Phylum: Arthropoda
- Class: Insecta
- Order: Orthoptera
- Suborder: Ensifera
- Family: Tettigoniidae
- Subfamily: Tettigoniinae
- Tribe: Drymadusini
- Genus: Paradrymadusa; Herman, 1874

Synonyms
- Paradrynadosa Kirby, 1906

Genus of cricket-like animals

External image
- Images at iNaturalist

Paradrymadusa is a genus of bush crickets in the tribe Drymadusini, erected by Ottó Herman in 1874. Species have been recorded from Turkey through to Afghanistan.

== Species ==
The Orthoptera Species File lists:

1. Paradrymadusa abchazica Stolyarov, 1981
2. Paradrymadusa aksirayi Karabag, 1952
3. Paradrymadusa brevicerca Karabag, 1956
4. Paradrymadusa bucharica Pravdin, 1970
5. Paradrymadusa fridae Werner, 1939
6. Paradrymadusa galitzini Retowski, 1888
7. Paradrymadusa pontica Ramme, 1939
8. Paradrymadusa sciadophila Stolyarov, 1980
9. Paradrymadusa sordida (Herman, 1874) - type species (as Drymadusa sordida Herman O)
