= Mihály Libercsey =

Mihály (II) Libercsey

Vice-ispán of Nógrád
- Reign: 1659–1666
- Born: 25 September 1612
- Died: 17 January 1670 (aged 57); Gács, Kingdom of Hungary (today Halič, Slovakia)
- Noble family: House of Libercsey
- Spouses: 1, Zsófia Földváry; 2, Anna Aranyady
- Issue: 10 children, including: Zsuzsanna; Anna; Rozina
- Father: Mihály I Libercsey
- Mother: Zsuzsanna Darvas

Mihály Libercsey de Kislibercse (Hungarian: kislibercsei Libercsey Mihály; 25 September 1612 – 17 January 1670) was a Hungarian soldier and nobleman, who served as vice-ispán of Nógrád County from 1659 to 1666.

== Early life ==
Mihály (II) Libercsey was born on 25 September 1612 into a Protestant noble family, which originated from Nógrád County, as one of the eleven children of Mihály (I) Libercsey (died on 23 January 1637), who served as chief magistrate (Hungarian: főszolgabíró) for a decade in the county (possibly in Gács district), and Zsuzsanna Darvas (died on 5 November 1657). Mihály II was the fourth child and the eldest son in the family.

He started his military career as captain of Divény Castle (today in Divín, Slovakia), subordinated to Count Imre Balassa, who served as Captain-General of Nógrád Castle and was the richest landowner in Nógrád County. In that capacity, Libercsey permanently represented his lord in the county court (sedria) in cases of border disputes between Balassa and Count Ádám Forgách, the lord of Gács (today Halič, Slovakia). Count Balassa was notorious for his crimes and plundering attacks against his neighbors. Libercsey left his lord and joined to the court of Forgách in 1656. His younger brother Ferenc (1622–1661) remained a partisan of Balassa.

== Career ==
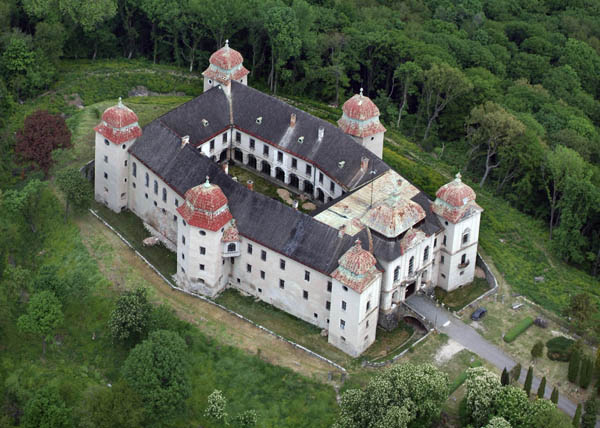
Caste of Gács/Halič (today in Slovakia)

From October 1656, Libercsey functioned as captain (or castellan) of Gács Castle until his death. He was commissioned by Forgách to renovate Somoskő Castle in that year (today the castle is situated in Slovakia, while the settlement remained in Hungary after the Treaty of Trianon, and now it is part of Salgótarján). During the first period of his captaincy, he had several jurisdictional conflicts with steward János Szelcsényi (died 1660). Libercsey also served as vice-ispán of Nógrád County from 1659 to 1666. He held the office alone in 1659 and alongside Péter Pápay from 1660 to 1664, alongside Pál Némethy from 1664 to 1665, and finally, alongside János Madách until 1666. Libercsey submitted his resignation citing illness in 1666, but Ádám Forgách, who was also ispán or Lord Lieutenant of Nógrád County, persuaded him to remain in office. However, even, Libercsey did not appear in contemporary records as vice-ispán after that.

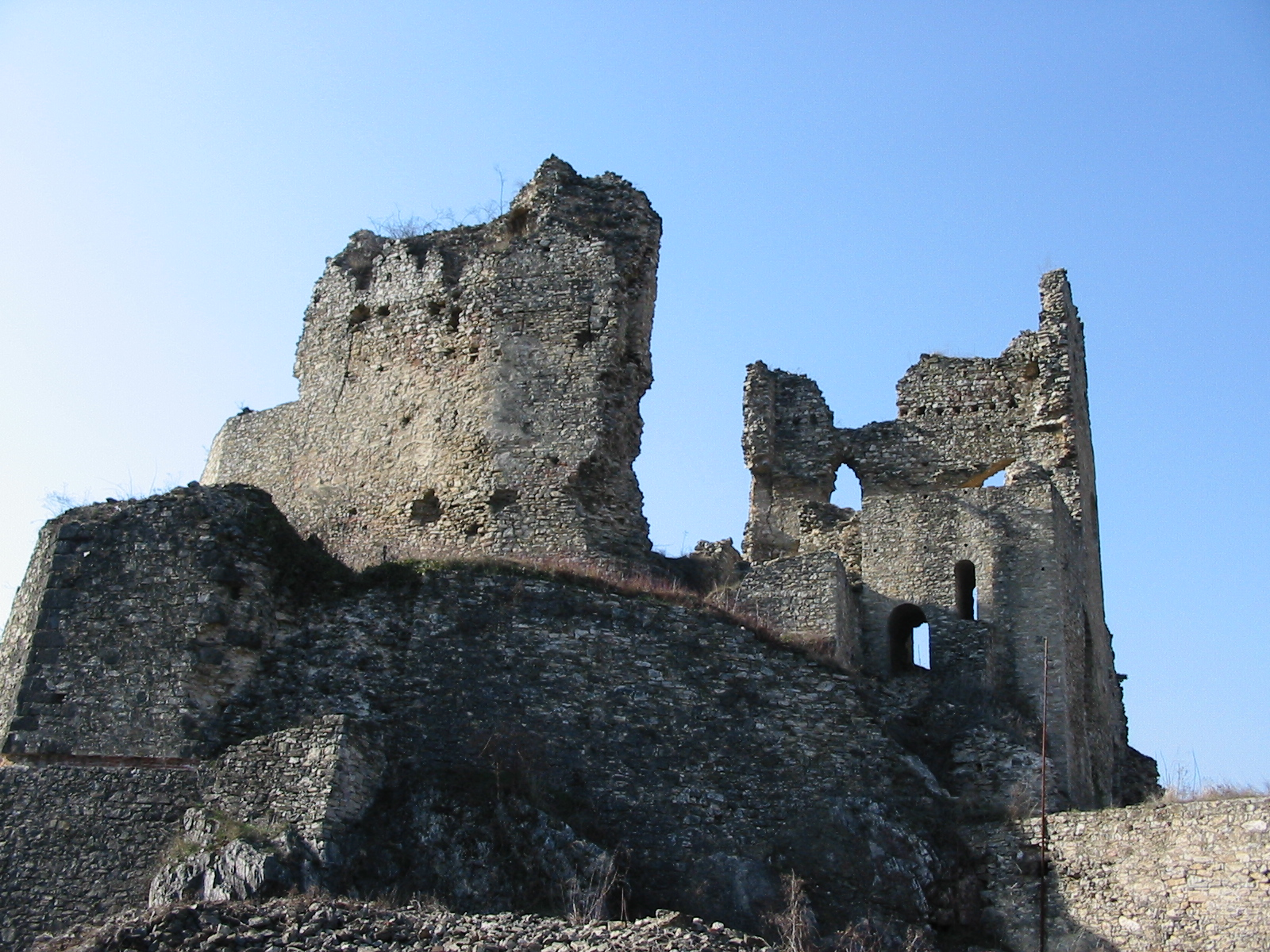
Caste of Divény/Divín (today in Slovakia)

Forgách's long-time rival Imre Balassa besieged Gács Castle on 21 March 1666, gathering his soldiers, hajdús and even forcibly conscripted serfs from the surrounding lands. Libercsey also had personal conflict with his former lord, who constantly plundered his estate of Podhradja. As vice-ispán, Libercsey filed the charges against Balassa to the tribunal of Ferenc Wesselényi, Palatine of Hungary in 1665. Balassa was sentenced for 32 counts of violation of law against his neighbours, and was imprisoned in Pressburg Castle (today in Bratislava, Slovakia). However, by the end of year, he escaped from prison and barricaded himself into his castle in Divény, few kilometers to Gács. Historian Emma Iványi argued Balassa's motivation to the siege was a personal revenge against Libercsey and his son-in-law János Madách, the second vice-ispán during that time. After the siege, the Garamszentbenedek Abbey (today Hronský Beňadik, Slovakia) reconstructed the events through 70 witnesses (much of them were relatives of Libercsey). According to the reports, the unorganized assault troops broke the gate and entered the exterior castle. The besiegers looted the manors, stables and warehouses. Following that the marauders left Gács and returned to Divény. As representative of Nógrád County, Libercsey sent a letter to Forgách on 22 July 1666, who resided in Vienna, which contained his report and the county's complaint.

== Personal life ==
Libercsey married Zsófia Földváry de Bernáthfalva, a daughter of nobleman György Földváry (1579–1635) and Anna Bene de Nándor (died 1626). Their wedding took place in 1638. The couple had ten children, but most of them died in childhood. As he had no legitimate sons at the time of his death, Mihály II became the last male member of the Libercsey family, which origin traced back to the 14th century. After his first wife died on 7 February 1665, Libercsey re-married to Anna Aranyady (died 1677), the widow of György Zmeskál, in 1667. Their marriage remained childless. Libercsey and Zsófia Földváry had the following children, according to the family's preserved birthday diary:

1. Gábor (8 September 1639 – 23 May 1649)
2. Zsuzsanna (11 March 1641 – 1696 or 1697). She married György Bezegh on 2 July 1656. They had a daughter Éva Bezegh, who married Kuruc brigadier János Sréter. Zsuzsanna's husband was tortured and executed by the Executive Court of Eperjes (today Prešov, Slovakia) on 14 May 1687.
3. Borbála (16 June 1643 – 26 November 1652)
4. Anna (29 November 1645 – 19 February 1713). She married János Madách (1619 – 19 February 1669), vice-ispán of Nógrád County, on 20 April 1664. After his death, Anna married János Dobay, also vice-ispán. They had two daughters (Borbála, Krisztina) and a son, László who later also became vice-ispán of the county. Anna was the last person who bore the Libercsey surname when she died.
5. Krisztina (19 June 1649 – 2 January 1651)
6. Mária (6 September 1651 – 26 April 1653)
7. Rozina (20 October 1656 – 1702). She married Gáspár Ráday de Ráda (died 1711), vice-ispán of Pest County. Their son Pál Ráday served as Chancellor in the court of Francis II Rákóczi.
8. Magdolna (28 May 1658 – ?). She married István Dacsó de Dacsólam et Keszihócz.
9. a son
10. Tamás (21 October 1662 – 22 October 1662)

== Sources ==
- Dümmerth, Dezső (1982). "A magyar köznemesi társadalom élettörténetéből : a Tetétleni–Földváry família sorsa és birtoklása az Árpád-kortól a XIX. század küszöbéig". Levéltári Közlemények. 53 (2). National Archives of Hungary: 207–260.
- Iványi, Emma (1984). "Egy XVII. századi várkapitány (Libercsey Mihály, 1612–1670) [A 17th-Century Castellan (Mihály Libercsey, 1612–1670)]". In H. Balázs, Éva; Fügedi, Erik; Maksay, Ferenc (eds.). Mályusz Elemér emlékkönyv. Társadalom- és művelődéstörténeti tanulmányok (in Hungarian). Akadémiai Kiadó. pp. 173–187. ISBN 963-05-3272-7.
