= Titusz Csörgey =

Hungarian ornithologist and bird artist (1875–1961)

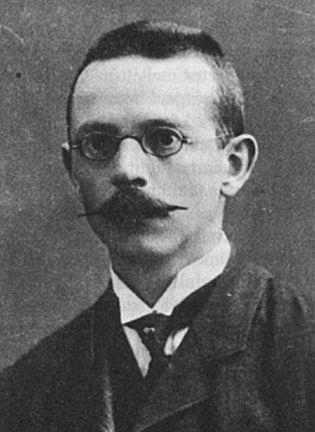

Titusz Csörgey (August 12, 1875 – December 15, 1961) was a Hungarian ornithologist and bird artist. He served as a director of the Hungarian ornithological institute after the death of Istvan Chernel.

== Life and work ==
Csörgey was the son of Károly Uhlig and was born Titusz Uhlig in Nezsider. After the early death of his mother, he was raised by his maternal grandparents in Dunaszerdahely and given their surname Csörgey. He became interested in birds when his family moved to Sopron. Here he was taught natural history by István Fászl at the Benedictine high school. He also learned to draw and prepare specimens and was introduced to Otto Herman by Fászl. In 1893 he went to study arts at the Pázmány Péter University of Science in Budapest but did not complete his degree. He then went to study ornithology in 1895 and helped edit the unpublished material of János Salamon Petényi and produced illustrations to go with the book which was published in Hungarian in 1904 and in German the next year. In 1903 he was sent by István Chernel to examine the Seebach station of Hans von Berlepsch. In 1904 he was involved along with Márton Kühnel in establishing a nest box manufacturing company - Magyar Fészekodú Gyár. In 1929 his exhibit on artificial bird nests won an medal at the World Exhibition in Barcelona. At the Hungarian ornithological institute, he became a deputy director under Chernel following the death of Herman. After Chernel's death he became the director. He retired in 1935 and lived at Ábrahámhegy next to Lake Balaton. In 1945, the Hungarian ornithological institute was destroyed in bombing along with the originals of his bird paintings. He began to lose his hearing and in December 1961 both he and his wife were admitted to hospital with heart problems and his death followed a week after that of his wife.
