= Gyula Pungur =

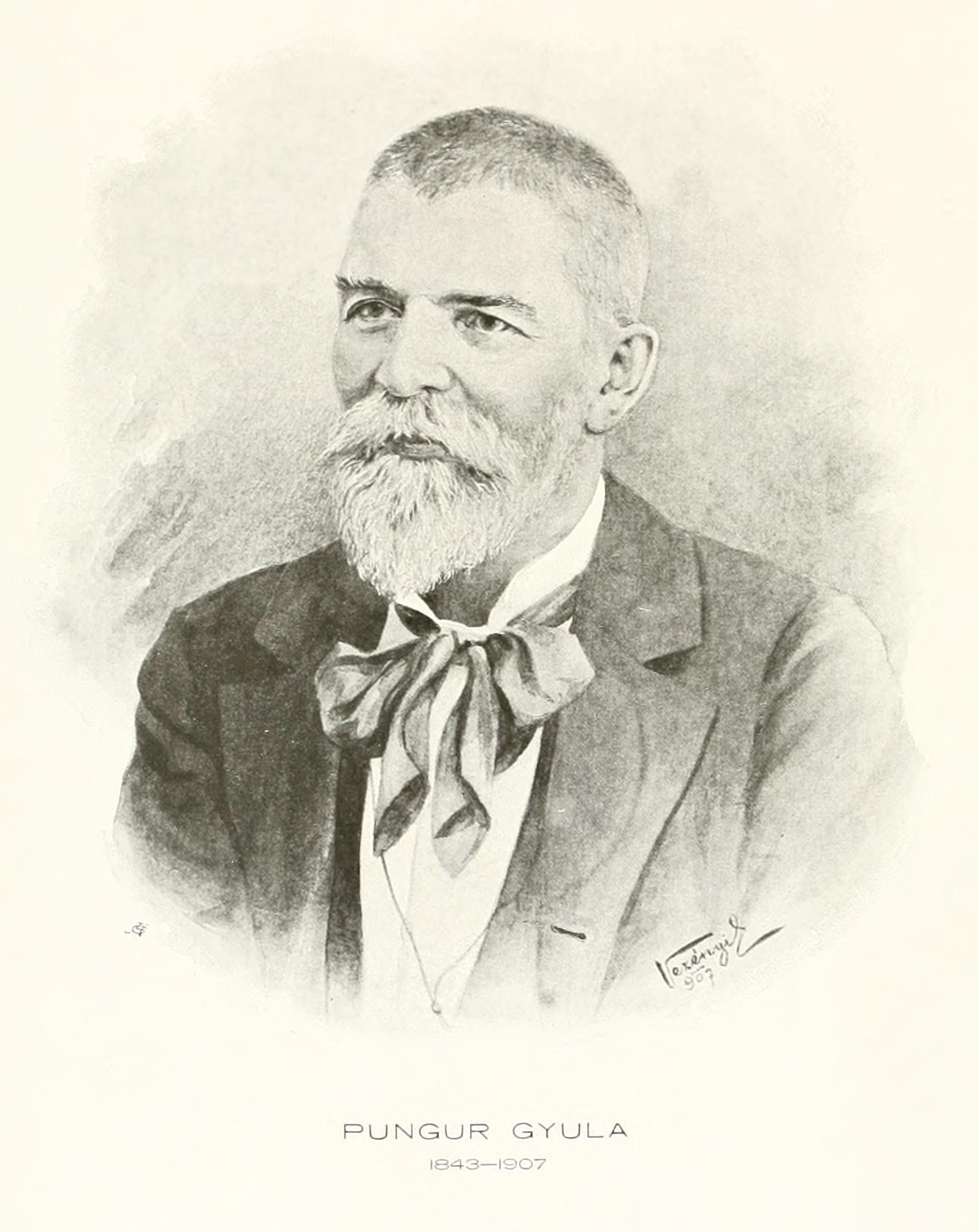

Gyula Pungur Germanized as Julius Pungur (24 May 1843 – 1 May 1907) was a Hungarian priest, ornithologist, entomologist and teacher. He took a special interest in the crickets of the region and served as a secretary of the Hungarian Ornithological Society.

== Life and work ==
Pungur was born in Erdőszengyel, the eldest of six children of estate manager Benjamin Pungur and Krisztina Nagy. His godparents were Count Sándor Bethlen and Countess Zsófia Tholdalagi. He went to elementary school in Sáromberke and Marosvásárhely. As a boy he took care along with his schoolmates at the deathbed of Farkas Bolyai. He trained as a teacher and became a private tutor. He received a theology degree from Bethlen Collegein Nagyenyed and at the University of Marburg (1866) studying under professors Henke, Heppe, Ranke and Langenbeck.

In 1865–66 he worked as a teacher in Marosvásárhely. In 1868–70 he taught the three children of Sándor Ugron in Mezőzáh, including István Ugron who later became a diplomat. It was also while working here that he met Ottó Herman who introduced him to natural history. He also met the governess Gabrielle Schimmer whom he married in 1870. In that year, he became a Calvinist pastor in Szilágynagyfalu, possibly with influence from Miklós Wesselényi. He was encouraged by Herman to work on the crickets and received support from the Royal Hungarian Natural Science Society to visit Vienna and study the collections of Carl Brunner von Wattenwyl. He began to collect orthoptera across the region. This resulted in Fauna Regni Hungariae: Orthoptera (1900). Most of the names used by Pungur are now considered junior synonyms.

In 1877 he taught at Zilah. In 1896, he began to work in the Hungarian Ornithological Centre with Herman and his multilingual skills were used for the journal Aquila and then became the secretary. He also began to organize data on the migration of swallows in 1898. He began to work on a dictionary of Hungarian animal names including folk names but he was not able to complete it. He moved to Zelenika, Dalmatia due to poor health and died there.
