= István Fászl =

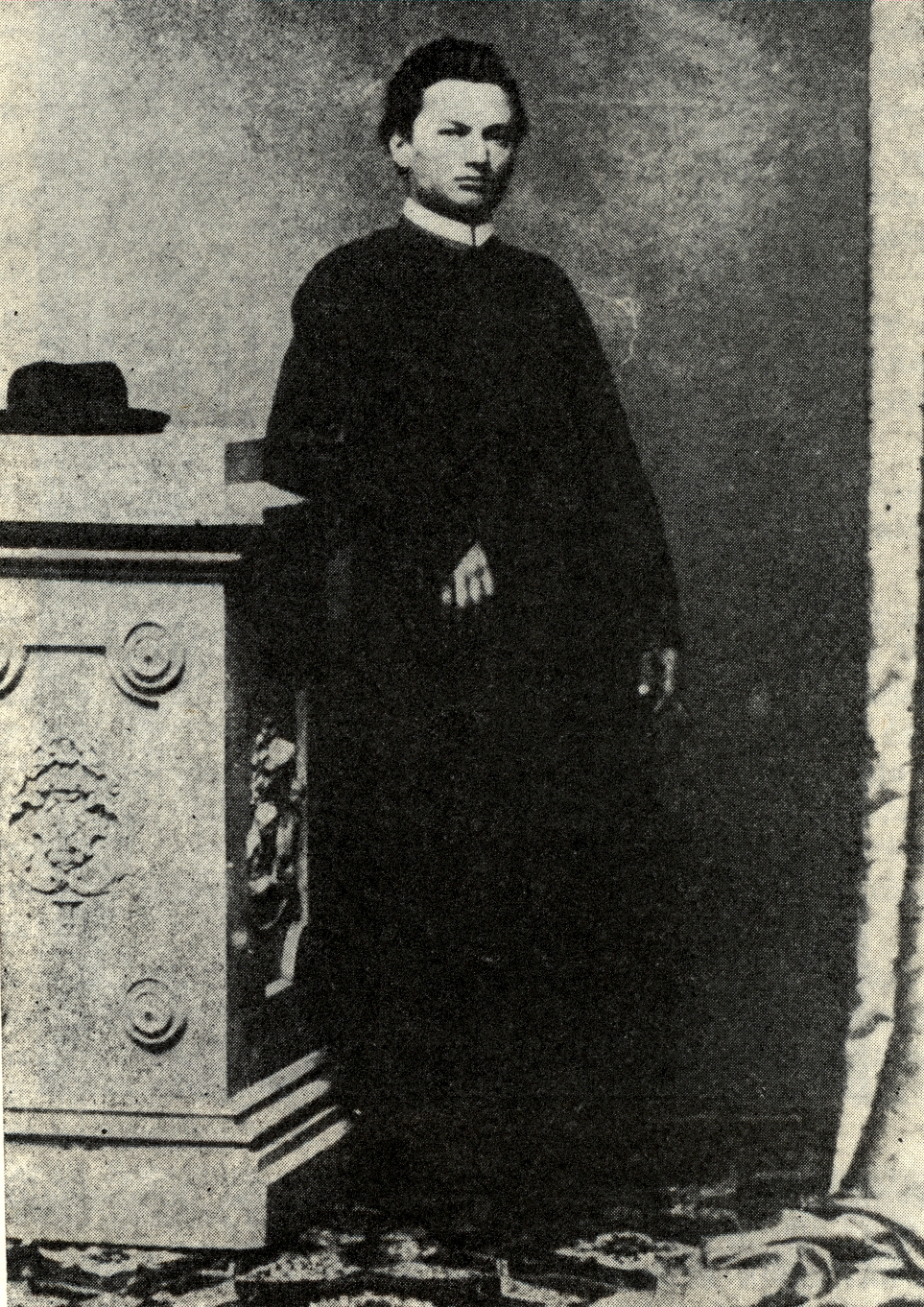

István Fászl (6 February 1838 – 26 January 1900) was a Hungarian priest of the Benedictine order, a teacher, naturalist, and ornithologist. He also took an interest in entomology and made a large collections of the flies of the Sopron region.

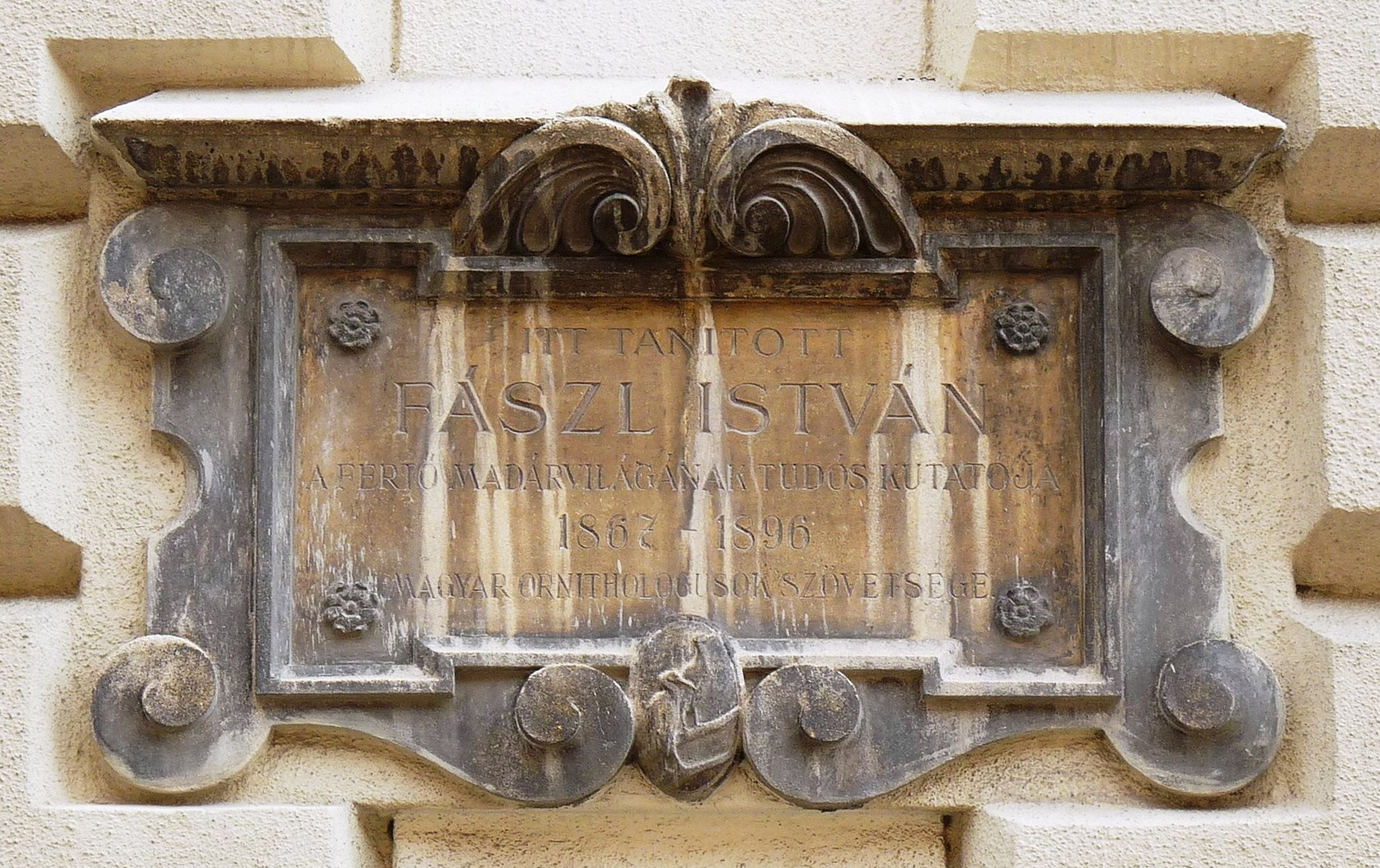
Commemorative plaque in Sopron

Fászl was born in Kőszeg where his father was a master shoemaker who decided that his son did not need to join him in the trade and enrolled him in the Gymnasium of the Benedictine order in 1855. He studied theology at Pannonhalma. In 1862, he was ordained priest and spent his early years teaching. In 1866 he was transferred to the grammar school in Sopron where he taught mathematics and natural history until 1895. In his spare time he collected specimens of natural history and established a museum at the school. He began to explore the Fertő and Hanság regions. His ornithological collection in the museum grew to nearly 1000. The collection was often visited by the Archduke Franz Ferdinand. He influenced several young students including the ornithologists István Chernel and Titusz Csörgey.
