= Pannonian Sea Museum =

Part of the Ottó Herman Museum in northeastern Hungary

Coordinates: 48.0956°N 20.7854°E

The Pannonian Sea Museum is one part of the Ottó Herman Museum in Miskolc in Hungary. It contains geological exhibits from the Pannonian Sea.

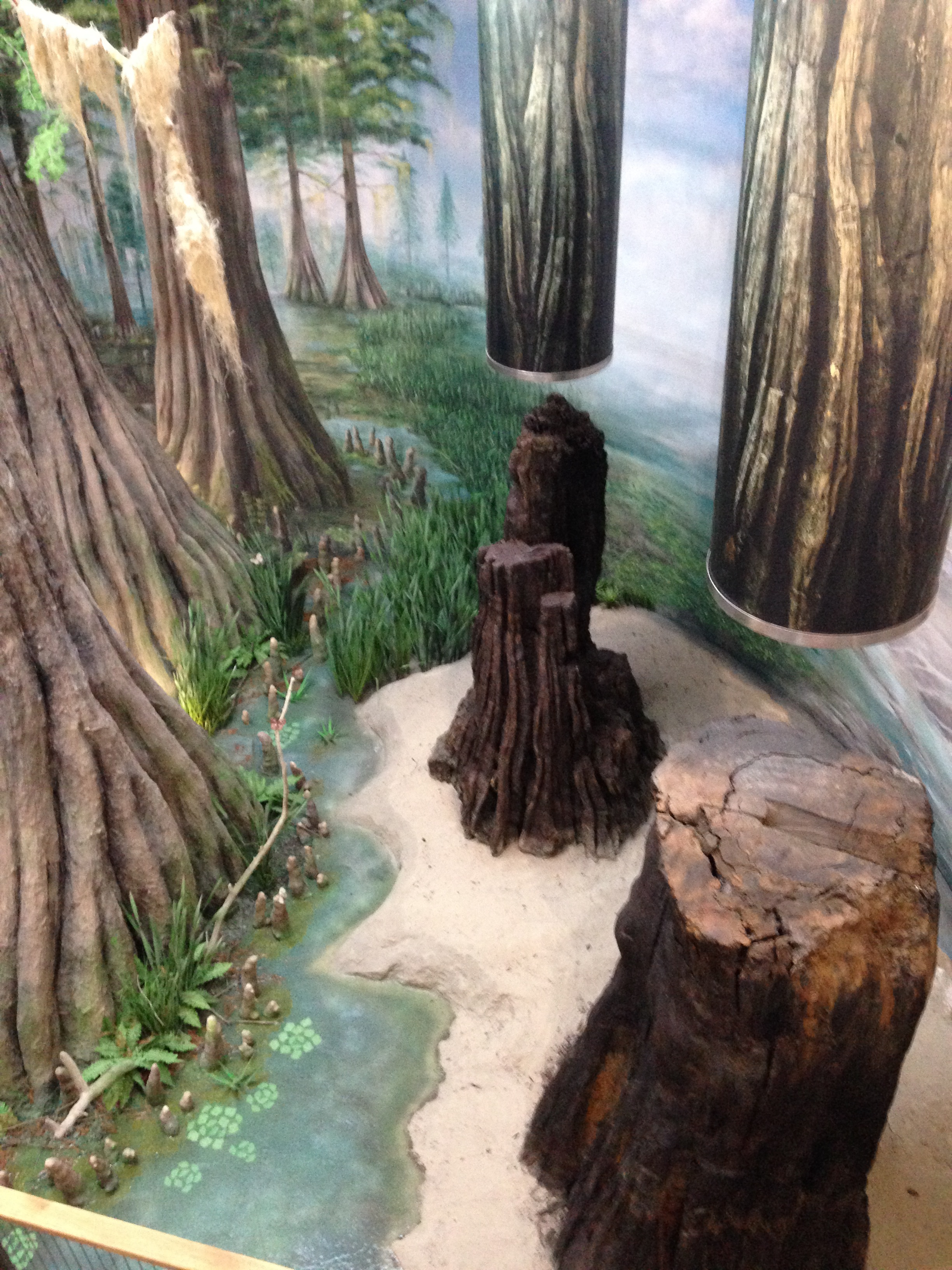
7 million years old swamp cypresses

== The 7 million years old swarm cypresses and the exhibition ==
2 brand new permanent exhibitions were opened in the “Pannonian Sea Museum” in Miskolc on 20 November 2013. The exhibition “On the paths of a primeval forest — The swamp cypress forest of Bükkábrány and its era” tells the visitors about the environment of the 7 million years old swamp cypresses in Bükkábrány in a playful environment. Besides fossils of several prehistoric animals and plants, Rudapithecus fossils representing the beginning of human evolution, mysteries of paleomagnetism, almost the whole spectrum of raw materials from the Miocene epoch and secrets of volcanic activities in the Pannonian Basin await curious visitors.

== Other exhibits and programmes ==
The beautiful pieces of the collection “Minerals of the Carpathians” wer selected from the second largest Hungarian mineralogical collection. Our regular and periodical programmes are held in a conference room for 80 persons, in a projector room for 40 persons and a seminar-room for 15 persons and are assisted by a separate museum educational facility.

== Gallery ==
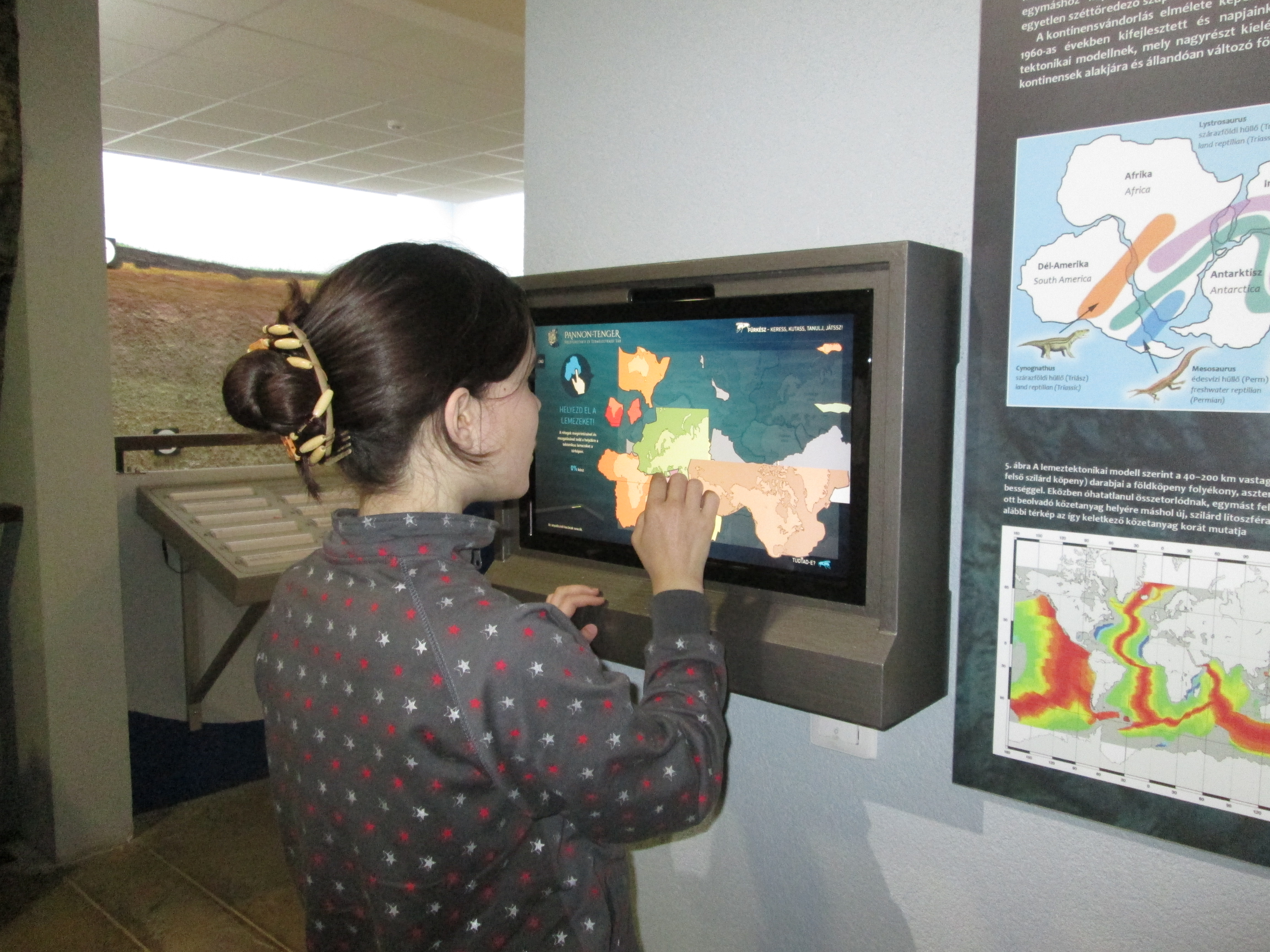
Interactive exhibition

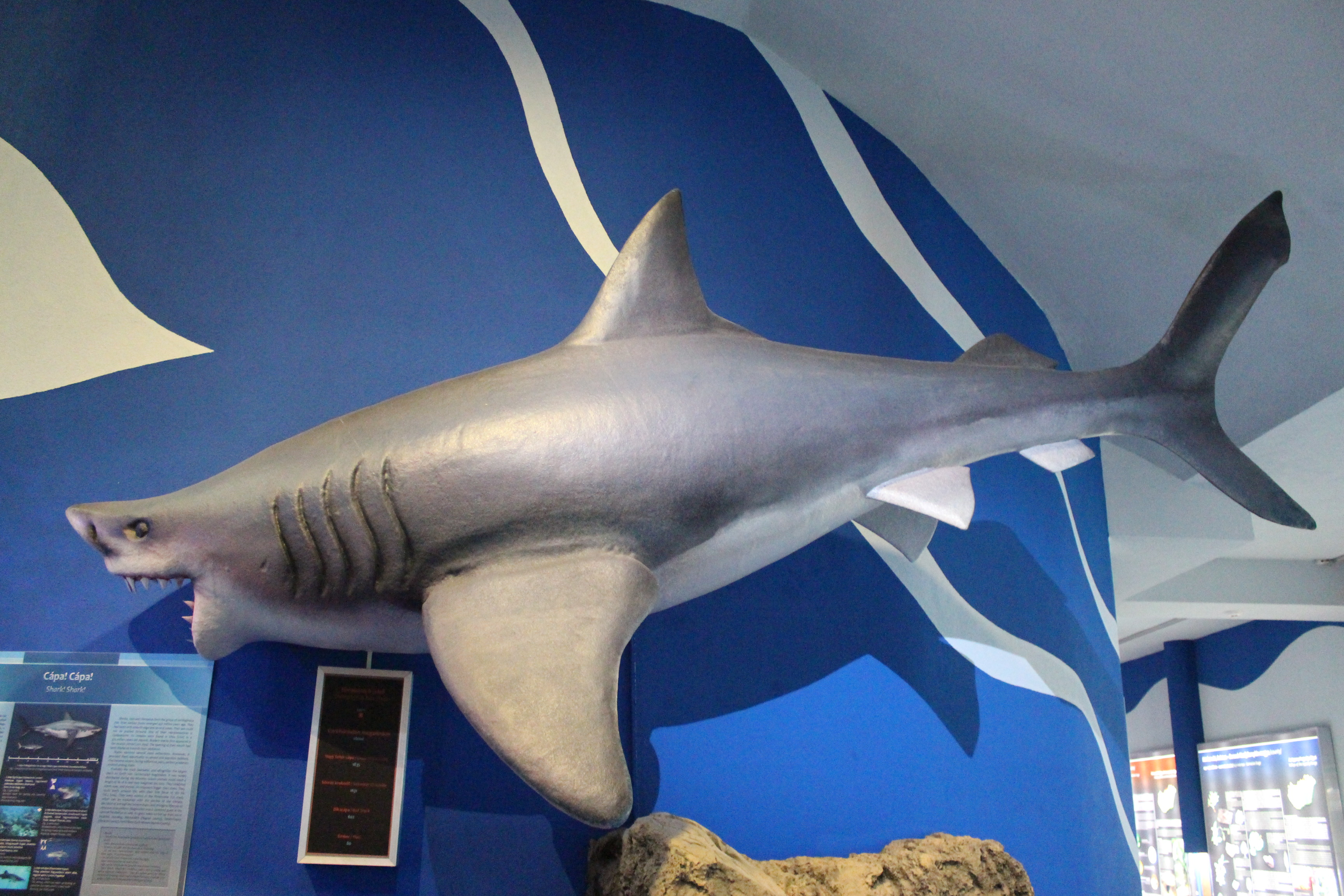
From the exhibition

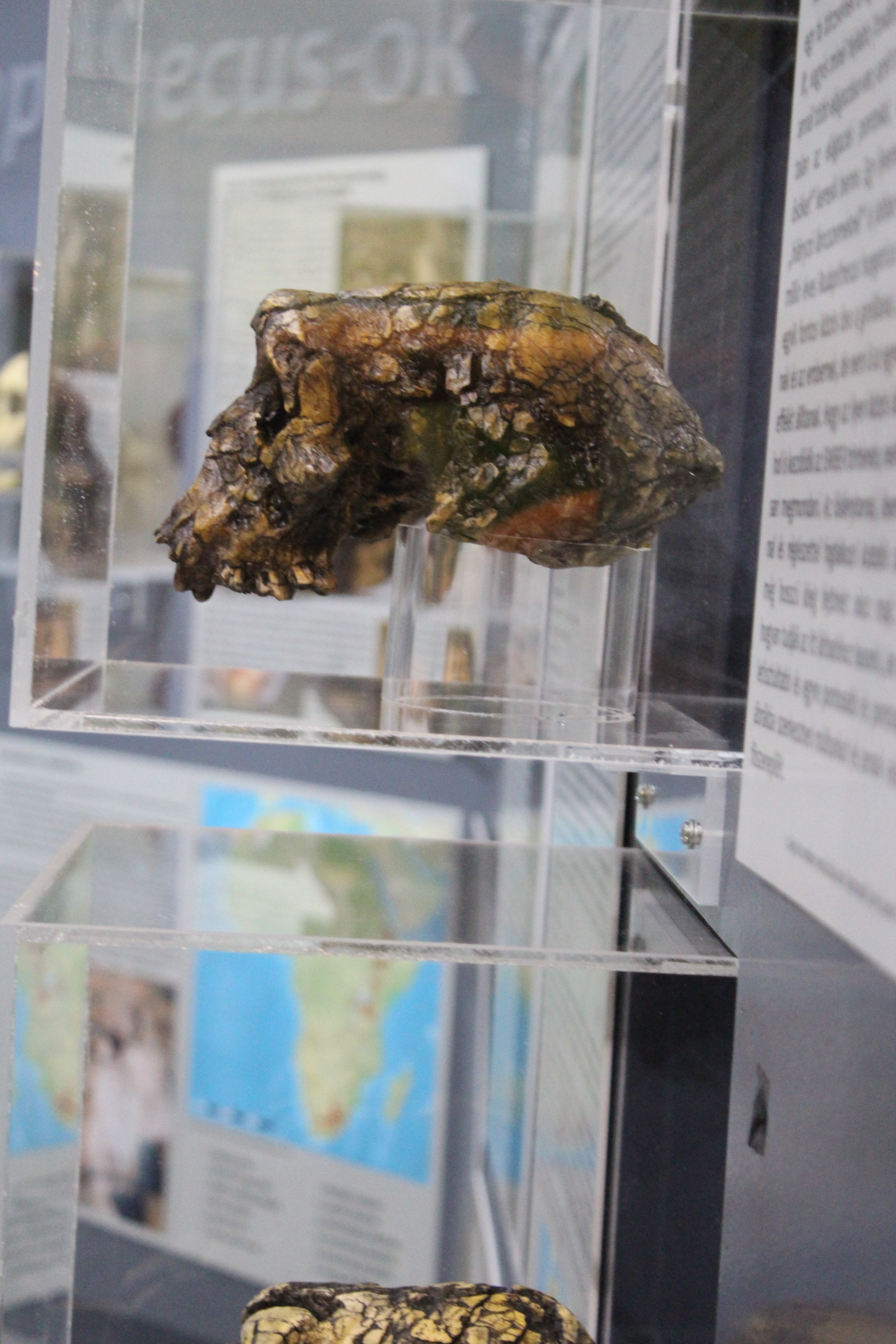
From the exhibition
