= Kálmán Chernel =

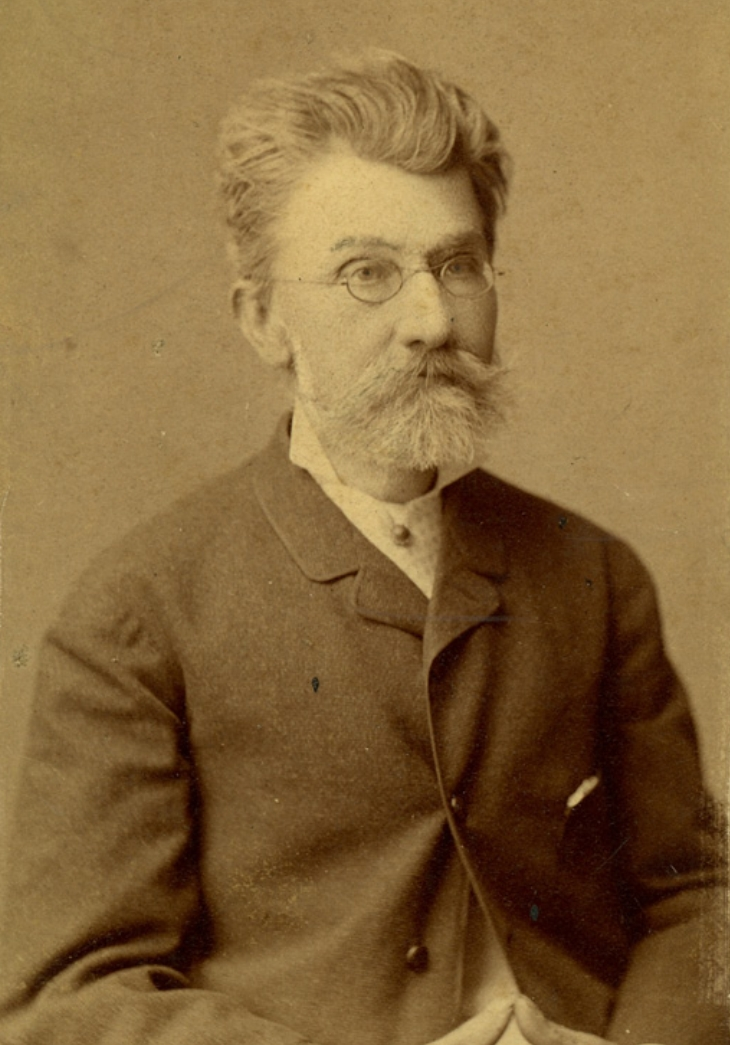

Kálmán György Ferenc Chernel (6 April 1822 – 21 April 1891) was a Hungarian noble, landowner, lawyer, historian, social worker, writer, and naturalist. He was the father of the ornithologist István Chernel.

Chernel was born in Kőszeg in the noble Chernel family. His father Ferenc Chernel (1778–1864) was a parliamentarian and his mother was Terézia Barthodeiszky de Rátki et Salamonfa (1788–1877). He studied philosophy at Szombathely and after studying law in Pressburg he became a county clerk in Sopron.

He was a founding member of the Hungarian Historical Society. He published extensively on history, hunting and ornithology. His history of the Kőszeg region examined its economy, the plants and animals of the region. In 1853 he wrote a history of garden art in German. He sought the protection of old trees. He supported the establishment of libraries and museums and supported Ottó Herman to obtain a position at the Transylvanian National Museum Kolozsvár.

He married Countess Mária Festetics (1835–1910) in 1861 and their son István Chernel founded the natural history collections of the Vasvár County Museum. Chernel worked for the support of the poor, established an orphanage and served as a vice president of the local savings bank in Kőszeg. He was elected as an honorary citizen of Kőszeg in 1861. His tomb in the cemetery of Kőszeg is included as a national memorial.
