= Jenő Vadas =

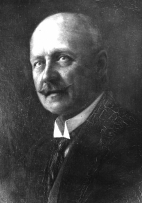

Jenő Vadas also as Eugen Vlkolínsky-Vadas (2 April 1857 – 21 July 1922) was a Hungarian forester and silviculturist who established the first forestry experimental station in 1897 at Selmecbánya in Austria-Hungary (present-day Banská Štiavnica, Slovakia). He also founded the forestry research journal Erdészeti Kísérletek in 1899. He was also a botanist and ornithologist.

Vadas was born in Hámor (Felsőhámor) near Miskolc, the original family name being Vlkolinszky (until 1882). His mother Franciska Hermann was the sister of the ornithologist Ottó Herman. After the early death of his father, his uncle had a role in his education as a naturalist. He went to secondary school in Miskolc and at the Evangelical Lyceum in Selmecbánya before studying forestry from 1874 at the Selmecbánya Academy. He then joined the directorate at Máramarossziget (today Sighetu Marmației, Romania). He moved to the forestry department under the Ministry of Agriculture, Industry and Trade in 1881. In 1882 he worked as a forester in Óvár (Olováry) and in 1885 he headed the forest ranger school in Vadászerdő near Temesvár (Timișoara). In 1886 he became director and in 1891 he taught silviculture at the Selmecbánya Forest Academy. In 1897 he established the forestry experimental station and became its first director. In 1899 he founded the journal Erdészeti Kísérletek. He was a corresponding member of the Hungarian ornithological center. He contributed to forestry topics in the Pallas Nagy Lexikon. He died in Budapest and was buried in Farkasréti Cemetery.

A street in Hámor was named after him and a statue was erected at Sopron in 1930.
