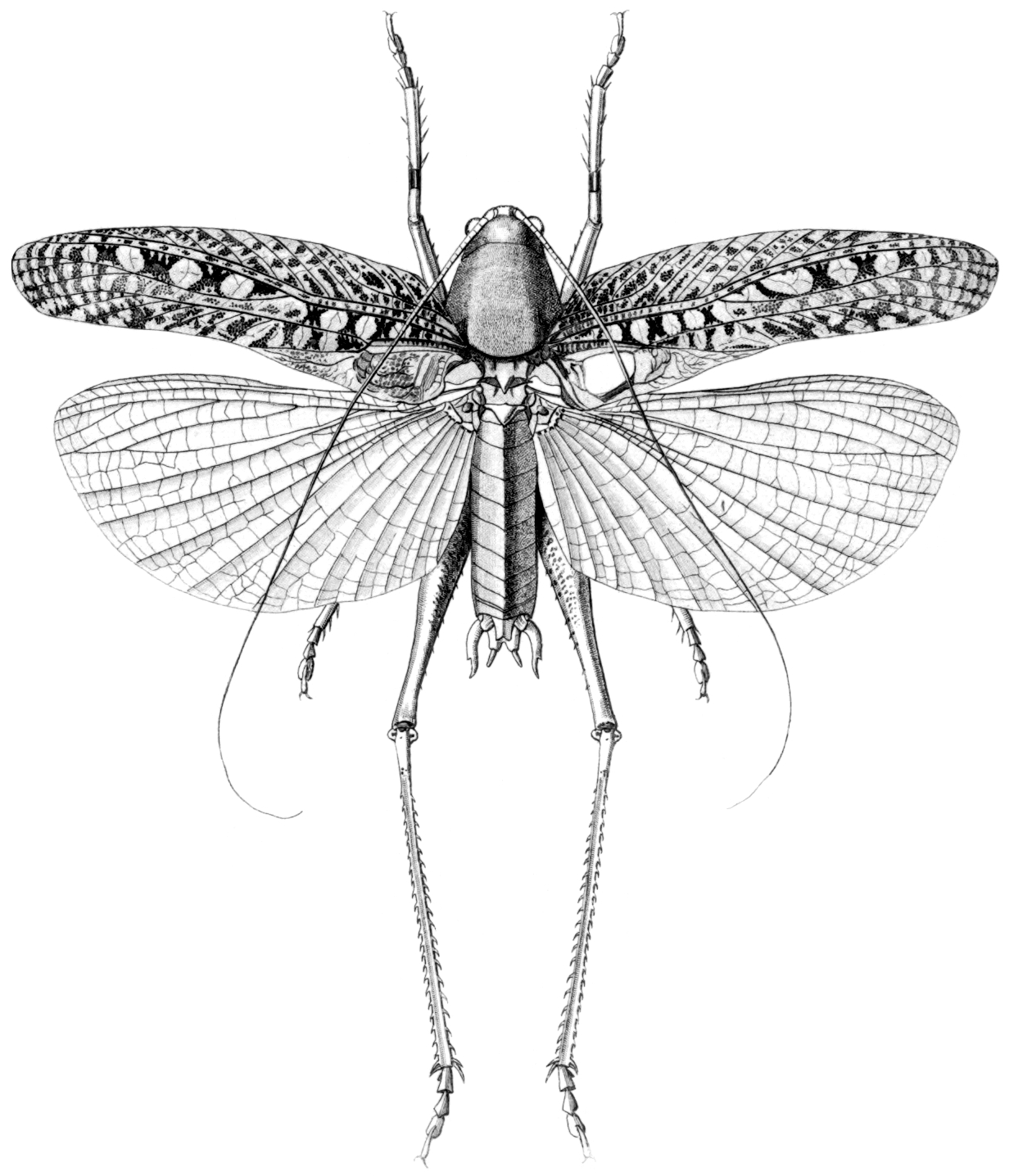

Scientific classification
- Kingdom: Animalia
- Phylum: Arthropoda
- Clade: Pancrustacea
- Class: Insecta
- Order: Orthoptera
- Suborder: Ensifera
- Family: Tettigoniidae
- Subfamily: Tettigoniinae
- Tribe: Drymadusini
- Genus: Drymadusa; Stein, 1860

Synonyms
- Drymadura Werner, 1933

= Drymadusa =

Genus of cricket-like animals

Drymadusa is a monotypic genus of bush crickets named by Johann Philipp Emil Friedrich Stein in 1860; it is the type genus of the tribe Drymadusini, which was erected by Boris Uvarov in 1924. Now containing the single species Drymadusa dorsalis, it previously included others moved to genera such as Afrodrymadusa, Anadrymadusa and Paradrymadusa.

== Subspecies ==
The Orthoptera Species File includes the single species Drymadusa dorsalis (Brullé, 1832) which has been recorded from Greece, Turkey and Iraq. There are three subspecies:

1. D. dorsalis dorsalis (Brullé, 1832)
2. D. dorsalis grandis Karabag, 1961
3. D. dorsalis limbata Brunner von Wattenwyl, 1882 (previously considered a separate species)

Song of Drymadusa dorsalis
