= Ábelová =

Ábelová Ábelfalva
- Municipality
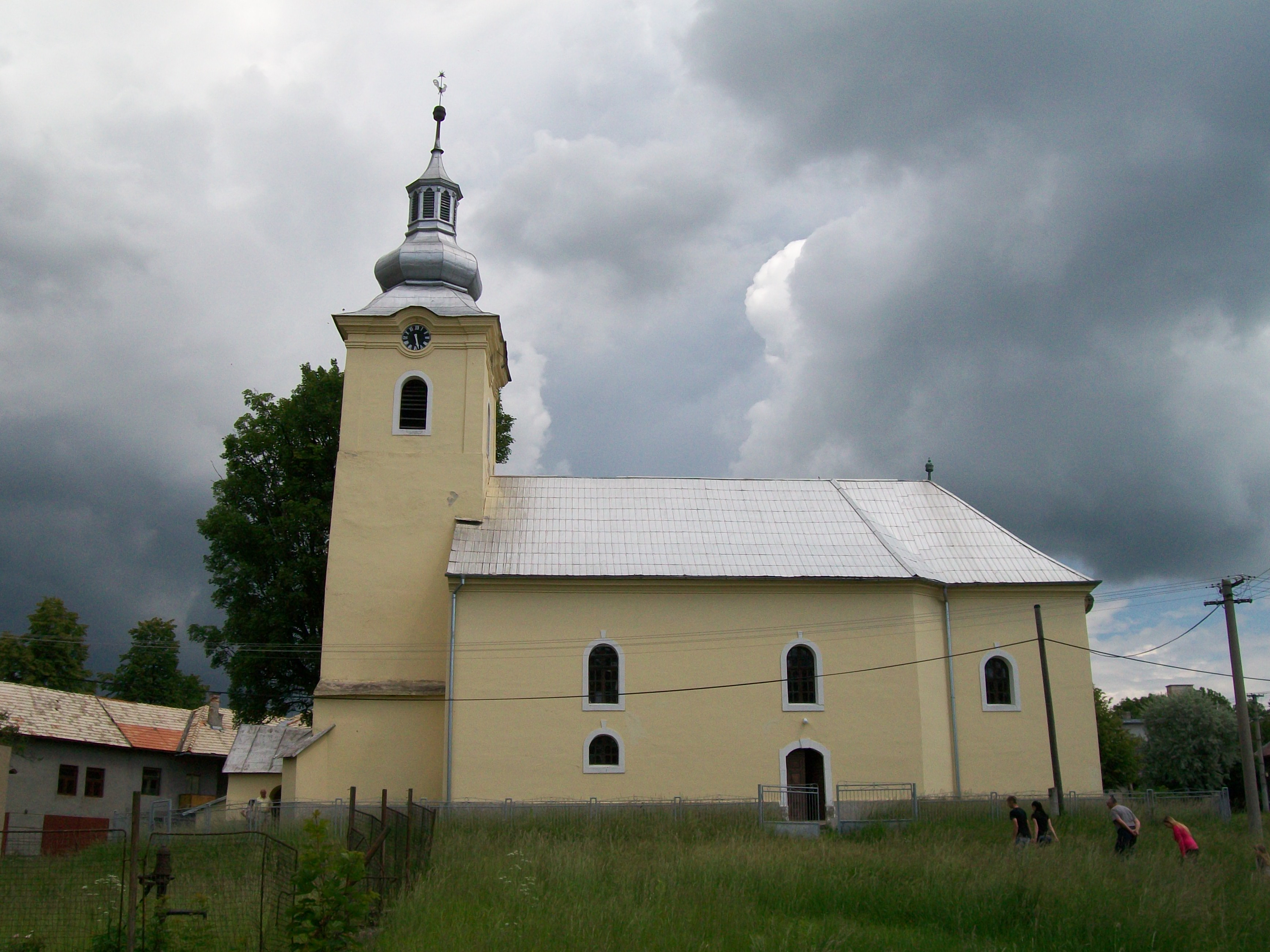

- Flag

- Location of Ábelová in the Banská Bystrica Region Location of Ábelová in Slovakia
- Coordinates: 48.42°N 19.43°E
- Country: Slovakia
- Region: Banská Bystrica Region
- District: Lučenec District
- First mentioned: 1275

Area
  - Total: 52.17 km^{2} (20.14 sq mi)
- Elevation: 445 m (1,460 ft)

Population (2025)
  - Total: 208
- Time zone: UTC+1 (CET)
  - Summer (DST): UTC+2 (CEST)
- Postal code: 985 13
- Area code: +421 47
- Vehicle registration plate (until 2022): LC
- Website: abelova.sk

Ábelová (earlier also Abelová, Jabelová; Hungarian: Ábelfalva, before 1907 Abellehota, before 1873 Abelova) is a village and municipality in the Lučenec District in the Banská Bystrica Region of Slovakia.

== Geography ==
The municipality lies at an altitude of 445 metres (1,460 ft) and covers an area of 52.17 km^{2} (20.14 sq mi) (2025).

== History ==
The village arose in the early 13th century. In historical records, it was first mentioned in 1275 (Abelfeuld). It belonged to Halič and until the 16th century partly also to Divín.

== Population ==
Population statistic (10 years)
Year	1995	2005	2015	2025
Count	286	254	226	208
Difference		−11.18%	−11.02%	−7.96%

Population statistic
Year	2024	2025
Count	213	208
Difference		−2.34%

It has a population of 208 people (31 December 2025).

=== Ethnicity ===
Census 2021 (1+ %)
Ethnicity	Number	Fraction
Slovak	194	88.58%
Not found out	21	9.58%
Romani	5	2.28%
Other	3	1.36%
Total	219	

In year 2021 was 219 people by ethnicity 194 as Slovak, 21 as Not found out, 5 as Romani, 3 as Other, 2 as Hungarian, 1 as Czech and 1 as Rusyn.

Note on population: The difference values of population numbers in the table "Population statistic" and in the sections "Ethnicity" & "Religion" is caused by the use of various statistical methods.

=== Religion ===
Census 2021 (1+ %)
Religion	Number	Fraction
None	83	37.9%
Evangelical Church	65	29.68%
Roman Catholic Church	44	20.09%
Not found out	21	9.59%
Total	219	

In year 2021 was 219 people by religion 83 from None, 65 from Evangelical Church, 44 from Roman Catholic Church, 21 from Not found out, 2 from Greek Catholic Church, 2 from Baptists Church, 1 from Calvinist Church and 1 from Paganism and natural spirituality.

== Genealogical resources ==
The records for genealogical research are available at the state archive in Banská Bystrica (Slovak: Štátny archív v Banskej Bystrici).

- Roman Catholic church records(births/marriages/deaths): 1755-1898
- Lutheran church records(births/marriages/deaths): 1736-1895 (parish A)
- Census records 1869 of Abelova are not available at the state archive.

== See also ==
- List of municipalities and towns in Slovakia
