= Simon Libercsey =

Hungarian nobleman

Vice-ispán of Hont alongside Francis Hati
- Reign: 1437
- Predecessor: Blaise Csehi
- Successor: Paul Balázsétei
- Noble family: House of Libercsey

Simon Libercsey (also Libercsei; Hungarian: Libercsey Simon) was a Hungarian nobleman, who served as vice-ispán of Hont County in 1437, alongside Francis Hati, when Stephen Aranyi and Blaise Sági simultaneously held the office of ispán in that year. Simon was an early member of the Libercsey family, which originated from Nógrád County and retained its influence mostly in Nógrád and Hont Counties until its extinction in 1670.

== Sources ==
- Bakács, István (1971). Hont vármegye Mohács előtt [Hont County Before the Battle of Mohács] (in Hungarian). Akadémiai Kiadó.
- Engel, Pál (1996). Magyarország világi archontológiája, 1301–1457, I [Secular Archontology of Hungary, 1301–1457, Volume I] (in Hungarian). História, MTA Történettudományi Intézete. ISBN 963-8312-44-0.
