= Aquila (journal) =

- Discipline: Ornithology
- Language: English, Hungarian
- Edited by: Gábor Magyar

Publication details
- History: 1894–present
- Frequency: Biannual
- Open access: yes

Standard abbreviations
- ISO 4: Aquila

Indexing
- ISSN: 0374-5708
- OCLC no.: 715765176

Links
- Online archive

Aquila is an ornithological journal established by Ottó Herman, Budapest, Hungary, in 1894; 131 years ago. It publishes peer-reviewed articles and research notes focusing on birds, mostly − though not exclusively − on the avifauna of the Carpathian Basin. Recent issues are bilingual, published in both English and in Hungarian. Aquila is indexed in Zoological Record, and in Fisheries and Wildlife Reviews.

== See also ==
- List of ornithology journals
