= Opatovská Nová Ves =

Opatovská Nová Ves Apátújfalu
- Municipality
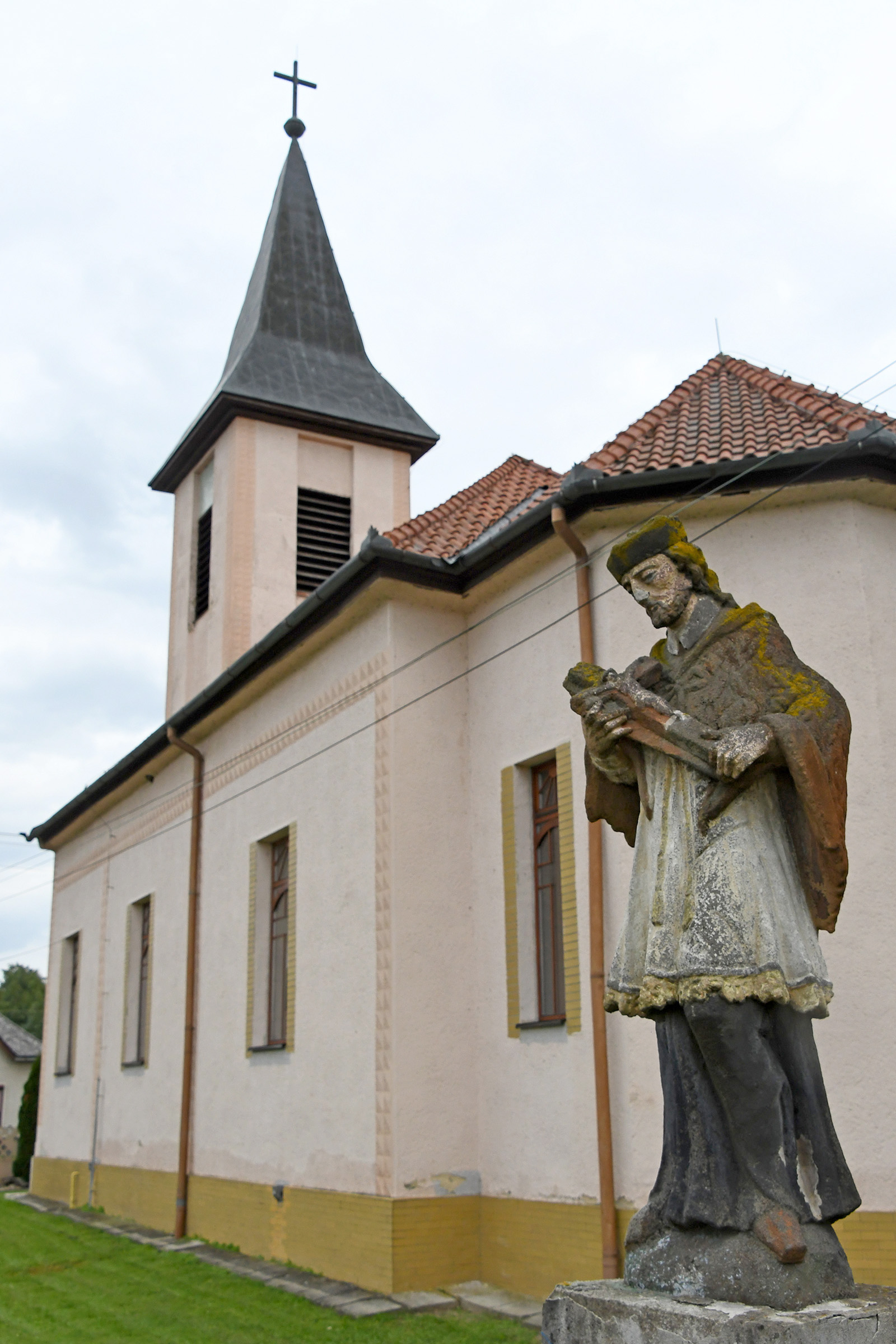

- Flag

- Location of Opatovská Nová Ves in the Banská Bystrica Region Location of Opatovská Nová Ves in Slovakia
- Coordinates: 48.12°N 19.28°E
- Country: Slovakia
- Region: Banská Bystrica Region
- District: Veľký Krtíš District
- First mentioned: 1323

Area
  - Total: 9.15 km^{2} (3.53 sq mi)
- Elevation: 154 m (505 ft)

Population (2025)
  - Total: 624
- Time zone: UTC+1 (CET)
  - Summer (DST): UTC+2 (CEST)
- Postal code: 991 07
- Area code: +421 47
- Vehicle registration plate (until 2022): VK
- Website: www.opatovskanovaves.sk

Opatovská Nová Ves (Hungarian: Apátújfalu) is a village and municipality in the Veľký Krtíš District of the Banská Bystrica Region of southern Slovakia.

== Geography ==
The municipality lies at an altitude of 154 metres (505 ft) and covers an area of 9.15 km^{2} (3.53 sq mi) (2025).

== Population ==
Population statistic (10 years)
Year	1995	2005	2015	2025
Count	649	663	689	624
Difference		+2.15%	+3.92%	−9.43%

Population statistic
Year	2024	2025
Count	626	624
Difference		−0.31%

It has a population of 624 people (31 December 2025).

=== Ethnicity ===
Census 2021 (1+ %)
Ethnicity	Number	Fraction
Slovak	340	53.37%
Hungarian	318	49.92%
Not found out	31	4.86%
Total	637	

In year 2021 was 637 people by ethnicity 340 as Slovak, 318 as Hungarian, 31 as Not found out and 1 as Bulgarian.

Note on population: The difference values of population numbers in the table "Population statistic" and in the sections "Ethnicity" & "Religion" is caused by the use of various statistical methods.

=== Religion ===
Census 2021 (1+ %)
Religion	Number	Fraction
Roman Catholic Church	555	87.13%
None	39	6.12%
Not found out	27	4.24%
Evangelical Church	8	1.26%
Total	637	

In year 2021 was 637 people by religion 555 from Roman Catholic Church, 39 from None, 27 from Not found out, 8 from Evangelical Church, 5 from Christian Congregations in Slovakia, 2 from Old Catholic Church and 1 from Calvinist Church.
