= Sirakov (surname) =

Sirakov (Bulgarian: Сираков) is a Bulgarian masculine surname, its feminine counterpart is Sirakova. Notable people with the surname include:

- Ivan Sirakov (born 1988), Bulgarian orienteering competitor
- Nasko Sirakov (born 1962), Bulgarian football striker
- Petko Sirakov (1929–1996), Bulgarian wrestler
- Volodya Sirakov (born 1953), Bulgarian Olympic water polo player
- Zahari Sirakov (born 1977), Bulgarian football player
- Rumen Sirakov (1941–2015), Bulgarian musician and tambura player
