= Chernelházadamonya =

- Location of Vas county in Hungary

- Location of Chernelházadamonya
- Coordinates: 47.36138°N 16.84117°E
- Country: Hungary
- County: Vas

Area
  - Total: 7.85 km^{2} (3.03 sq mi)

Population (2004)
  - Total: 209
  - Density: 26.62/km^{2} (68.9/sq mi)
- Time zone: UTC+1 (CET)
  - Summer (DST): UTC+2 (CEST)
- Postal code: 9624
- Area code: 94

Chernelházadamonya (Hungarian: [ˈt͡ʃɛrnɛlhaːzɒdɒmoɲɒ]) is a village in Vas County, Hungary.

Chernelházadamonya is known for having the longest name in all of Hungary. When determining which Hungarian settlement has the “longest name”, it depends on how “length” is measured, though. If by Hungarian orthographic letters (i.e., treating digraphs such as sz, gy, ny, cs, zs as single letters), then Chernelházadamonya comprises 18 letters, making it the longest official settlement name in Hungary by that measure.

If by plain written characters, then Jászfelsőszentgyörgy has 20 characters (though only 16 Hungarian letters), and thus would be longer by that metric.

In short: the claim that Chernelházadamonya is the longest name is valid only if “length” is defined as number of Hungarian letters rather than number of characters.
