= Ottó Herman Museum =

Museum in Miskolc, Hungary

Coordinates: 48°5′44.1″N 20°47′6.5″E

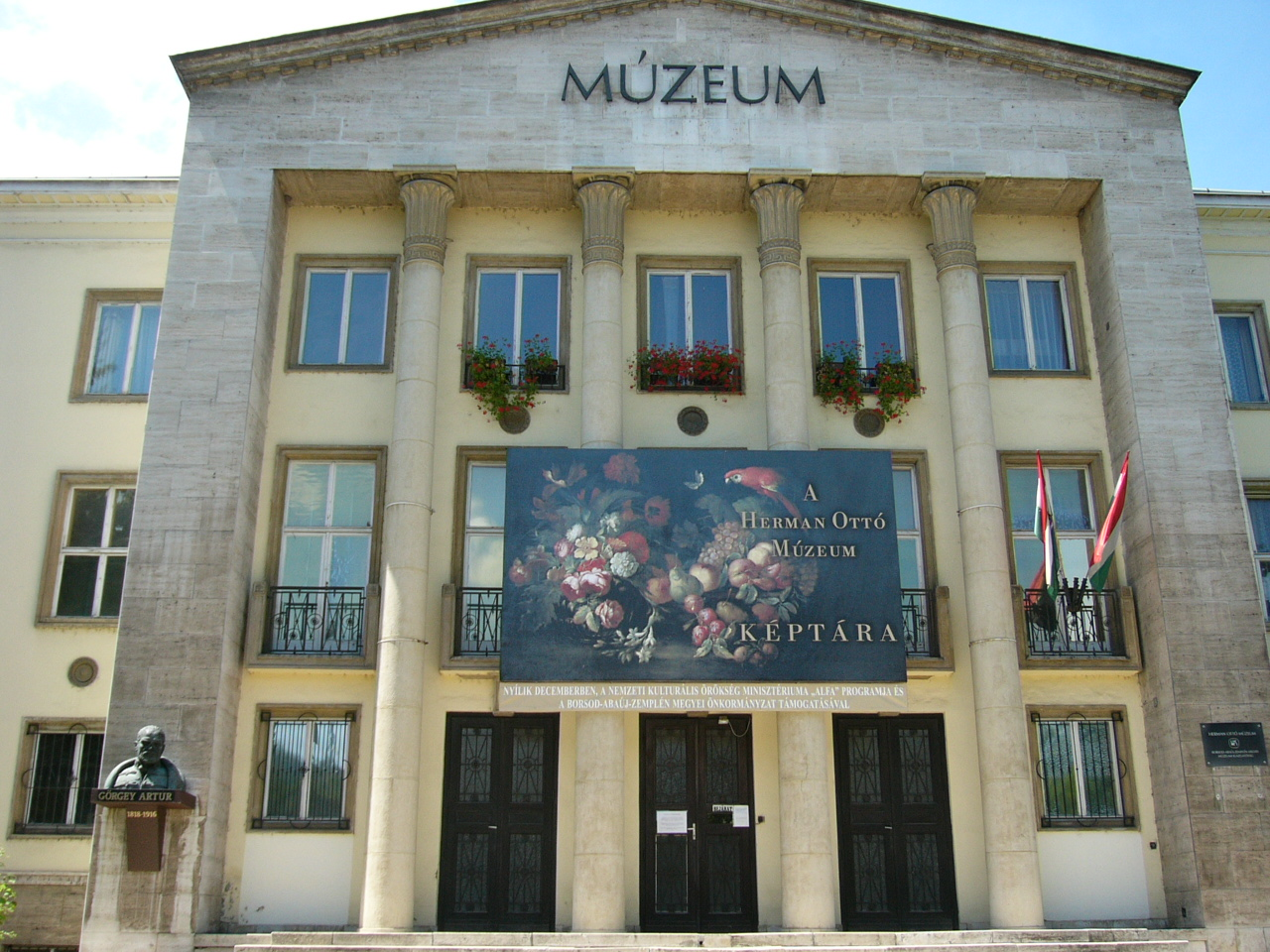
- Main building of the museum on Görgey street
- Former name: Borsod-Miskolcz Museum
- Established: 1899
- Location: Miskolc, Hungary
- Type: Archeology; mineralogy; arts; history; ethnography
- Website: hermuz.hu/en/main-page

The Ottó Herman Museum is the largest museum in Miskolc, Hungary. It holds more than 600,000 artifacts. Its main focus is on archaeology, mineralogy, arts, history, and ethnography.

== History ==
The museum was founded in 1899 under the name Borsod-Miskolcz Museum (Borsod is the historical county whose capital is Miskolc, and Miskolcz is an archaic spelling of the name of the city.) It became state property in 1949. The museum took the name of the famous polymath Ottó Herman in 1953. Since 1963, it collects artifacts not only from Miskolc and Borsod, but from the whole unified Borsod-Abaúj-Zemplén county.

== Exhibition sites belonging to the Ottó Herman Museum ==
The museum has several buildings both in Miskolc and in Borsod-Abaúj-Zemplén county. The one near Erzsébet square in Miskolc is the oldest. It hosts the mineral collection. The main building on Görgey street was built in 1952; it holds the arts museum, library, and storerooms.

The Pannonian Sea Museum is one of the new parts of the museum, which opened in 2013.

Other exhibition sites are the Abaúj Museum at Forró, the Bodrogköz Castle Museum of Pácin, the Ferenc Kazinczy Museum of Sátoraljaújhely, the Ferenc Kazinczy Memorial Hall in Széphalom, the Gallery of Sárospatak, the Gömör Museum of Putnok, the László Holló Gallery of Putnok, the Matyó Museum of Mezőkövesd, the Agricultural Machines Museum of Mezőkövesd, the Museum of Tokaj in Tokaj, and the Zemplén Museum of Szerencs.
