= Sirákov =

- Municipality
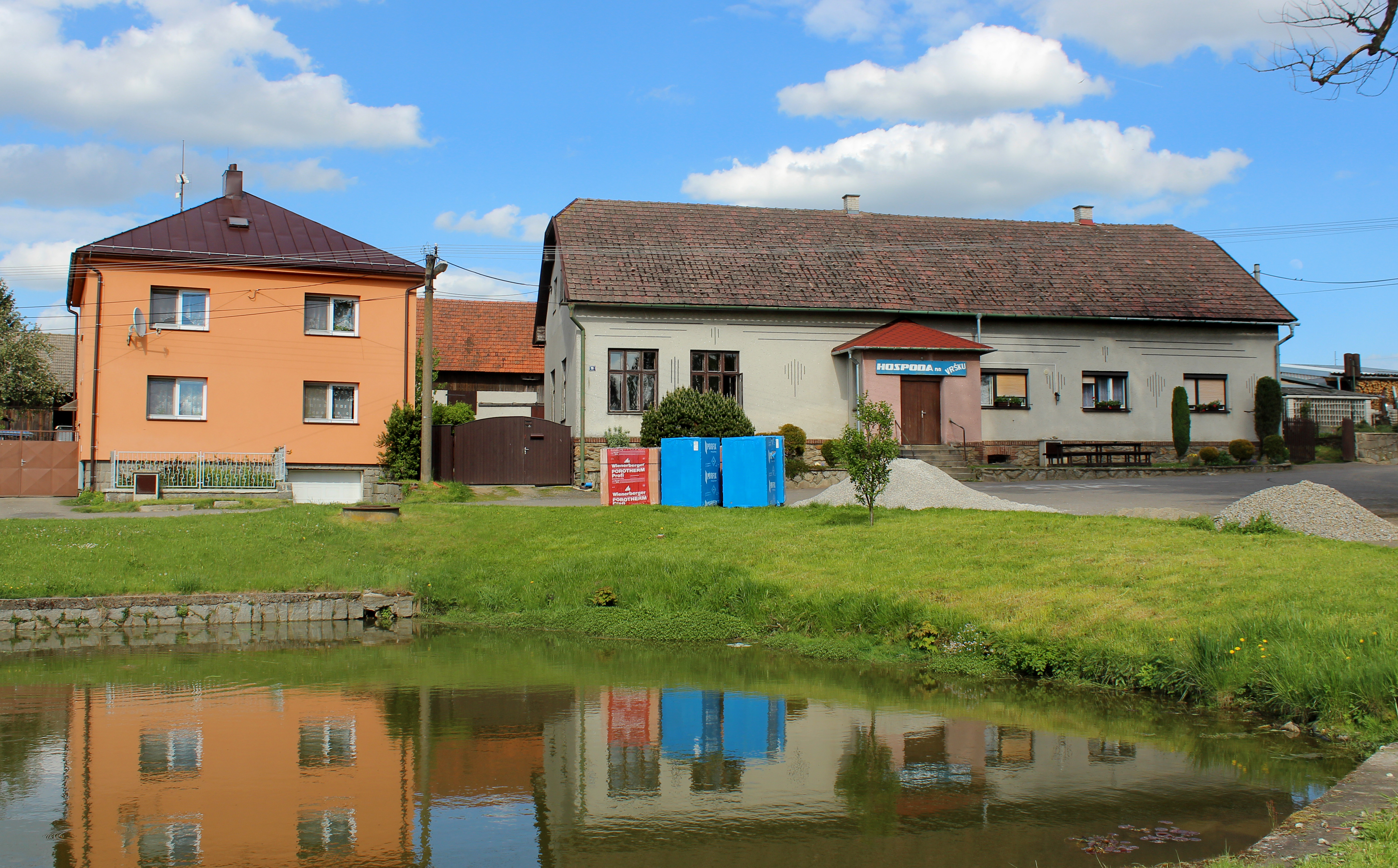
- Upper pond

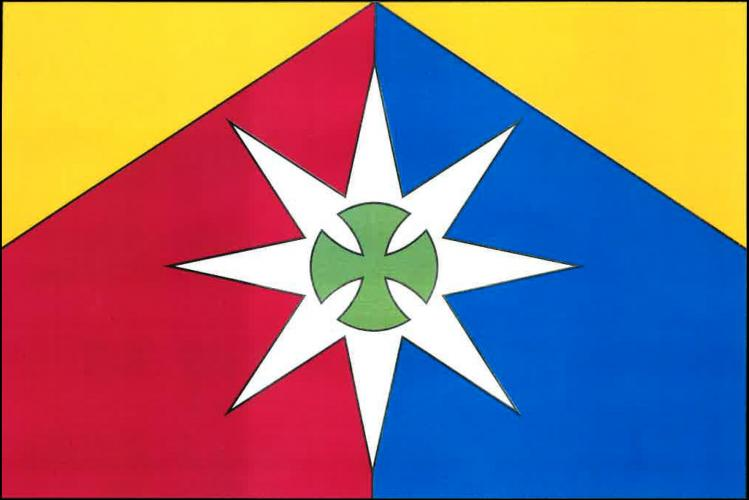
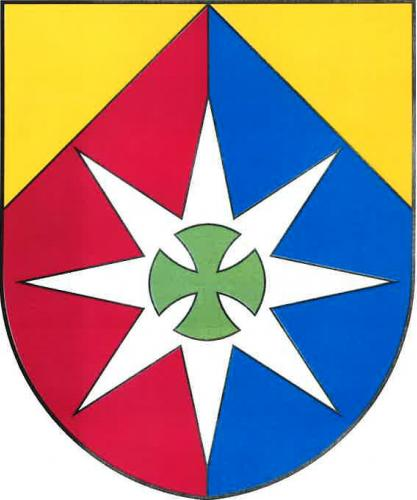
- Flag Coat of arms

- Location in the Czech Republic
- Coordinates: 49°30′17″N 15°49′6″E
- Country: Czech Republic
- Region: Vysočina
- District: Žďár nad Sázavou
- First mentioned: 1319

Area
  - Total: 7.00 km^{2} (2.70 sq mi)
- Elevation: 592 m (1,942 ft)

Population (2026-01-01)
  - Total: 271
  - Density: 38.7/km^{2} (100/sq mi)
- Time zone: UTC+1 (CET)
  - Summer (DST): UTC+2 (CEST)
- Postal code: 592 12
- Website: www.sirakov.cz

Sirákov is a municipality and village in Žďár nad Sázavou District in the Vysočina Region of the Czech Republic. It has about 300 inhabitants.

Sirákov lies approximately 11 kilometres (7 mi) south-west of Žďár nad Sázavou, 21 km (13 mi) north-east of Jihlava, and 120 km (75 mi) south-east of Prague.

== Demographics ==
Historical population
Year	Pop.	±%
1869	343	—
1880	424	+23.6%
1890	421	−0.7%
1900	368	−12.6%
1910	391	+6.2%
1921	351	−10.2%
1930	350	−0.3%
1950	280	−20.0%
1961	273	−2.5%
1970	242	−11.4%
1980	252	+4.1%
1991	239	−5.2%
2001	239	+0.0%
2011	256	+7.1%
2021	271	+5.9%
Source: Censuses
