= Širákov =

Širákov Sirak
- Municipality
- Flag

- Location of Širákov in the Banská Bystrica Region Location of Širákov in Slovakia
- Coordinates: 48.15°N 19.18°E
- Country: Slovakia
- Region: Banská Bystrica Region
- District: Veľký Krtíš District
- First mentioned: 1303

Government
  - Mayor: Tibor Dímik (Hungarian Alliance)

Area
  - Total: 7.11 km^{2} (2.75 sq mi)
- Elevation: 196 m (643 ft)

Population (2025)
  - Total: 179
- Time zone: UTC+1 (CET)
  - Summer (DST): UTC+2 (CEST)
- Postal code: 991 27
- Area code: +421 47
- Vehicle registration plate (until 2022): VK
- Website: obecsirakov.sk

Širákov (Hungarian: Sirak) is a village and municipality in the Veľký Krtíš District of the Banská Bystrica Region of southern Slovakia.

== Geography ==
The municipality lies at an altitude of 196 metres (643 ft) and covers an area of 7.11 km^{2} (2.75 sq mi) (2025).

== Population ==
Population statistic (10 years)
Year	1995	2005	2015	2025
Count	254	239	203	179
Difference		−5.90%	−15.06%	−11.82%

Population statistic
Year	2024	2025
Count	181	179
Difference		−1.10%

It has a population of 179 people (31 December 2025).

=== Ethnicity ===
Census 2021 (1+ %)
Ethnicity	Number	Fraction
Hungarian	116	61.05%
Slovak	93	48.94%
Not found out	5	2.63%
English	2	1.05%
Total	190	

In year 2021 was 190 people by ethnicity 116 as Hungarian, 93 as Slovak, 5 as Not found out and 2 as English.

Note on population: The difference values of population numbers in the table "Population statistic" and in the sections "Ethnicity" & "Religion" is caused by the use of various statistical methods.

=== Religion ===
Census 2021 (1+ %)
Religion	Number	Fraction
Roman Catholic Church	167	87.89%
None	15	7.89%
United Methodist Church	2	1.05%
Evangelical Church	2	1.05%
Total	190	

In year 2021 was 190 people by religion 167 from Roman Catholic Church, 15 from None, 2 from United Methodist Church, 2 from Evangelical Church, 1 from Not found out, 1 from Other, 1 from Greek Catholic Church and 1 from Buddhism.
