= Halič =

Halič Gács
- Municipality
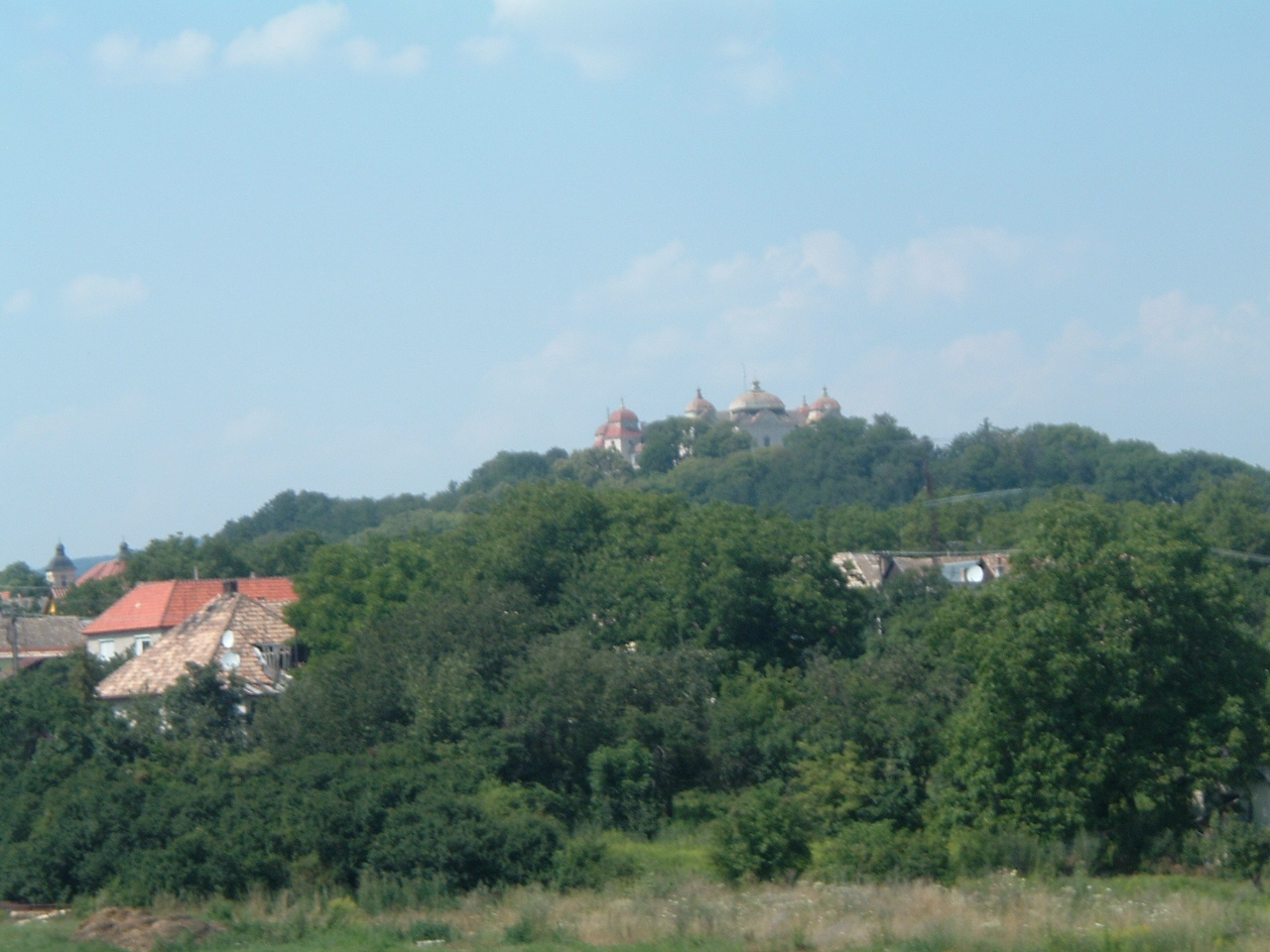
- Halič Castle

- Flag

- Location of Halič in the Banská Bystrica Region Location of Halič in Slovakia
- Coordinates: 48.35°N 19.58°E
- Country: Slovakia
- Region: Banská Bystrica Region
- District: Lučenec District
- First mentioned: 1200

Area
  - Total: 21.77 km^{2} (8.41 sq mi)
- Elevation: 262 m (860 ft)

Population (2025)
  - Total: 1,687
- Time zone: UTC+1 (CET)
  - Summer (DST): UTC+2 (CEST)
- Postal code: 985 11
- Area code: +421 47
- Vehicle registration plate (until 2022): LC
- Website: www.halic.sk

Halič (German: Geschatz; Hungarian: Gács) is a village and municipality in the Lučenec District in the Banská Bystrica Region of Slovakia.

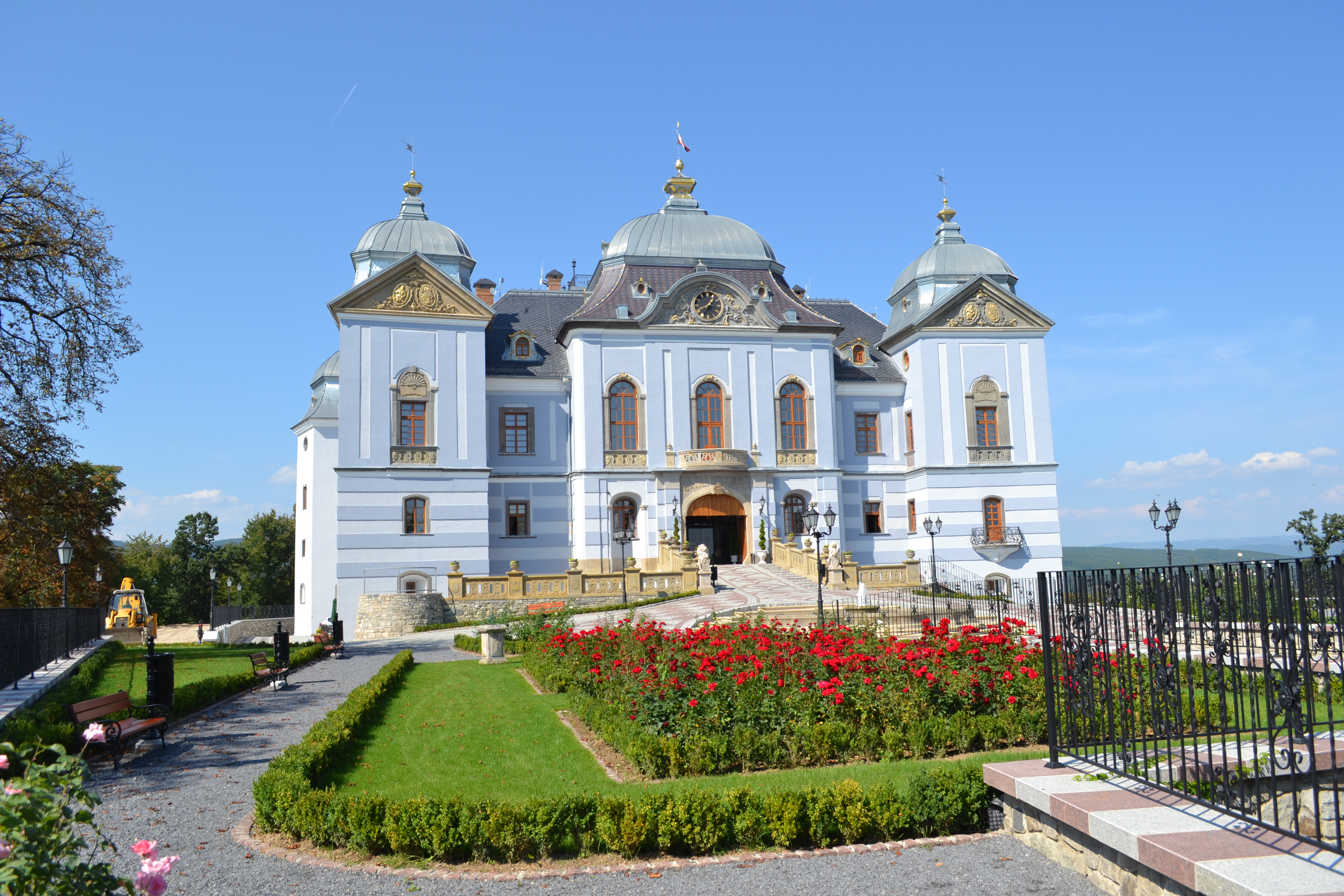
Halič Castle

== Geography ==
The municipality lies at an altitude of 262 metres (860 ft) and covers an area of 21.77 km^{2} (8.41 sq mi) (2025).

== History ==
In historical records, the village was first mentioned in 1299 (Gach) in the records of the Kingdom of Hungary as the location of a very important castle. From 1554 to 1594 it was occupied by Turks. Before the creation of independent Czechoslovakia in 1918, it was part of Nógrád County within the Kingdom of Hungary. From 1938 to 1945 it again belonged to Hungary as a result of the First Vienna Award.

== Halič Castle ==
The first appearance in literature of the castle in Halič is from the year 1450. Halič the village was first mentioned as a settlement surrounding this castle in 1299 and titled Holuch, Gach but the castle was only mentioned in passing. The castle was built without any royal permission by magister Tamas from Lučenec.

In the years 1450-51 it belonged to the Jiskras, later to János Hunyady before becoming inhabited by King Matthias Corvinus in 1462. In the first half of the 16th century it was in property of Istvan Losonczy. The castle was reconstructed, again without royal permission, by him and was damaged in 1544 during a siege. After the death of Štefan Lučenský, his daughter Anne inherited the county and married Zsigmund Forgách. The Forgáčs were one of the oldest Hungarian aristocratic family being descendants of the Great Moravian family Poznam, who had preserved their positions in Slovakia after its incorporation into the Kingdom of Hungary. The Halič castle was owned by the Forgáčs until 1945.

Zsigmond Forgách rebuilt the castle on land which had been part of the estate of the owner of the county since 1598, choosing a site that was both strategic and offering natural fortifications. In 1612 it was repaired carefully and the foundations of an irregular hexagon was laid. On top of these; a storied building with six corner bastions was constructed, secured by a ditch and mounds. Wings of this hexagon led into a courtyard with plain walls, later covered with many murals depicting figures of the Roman emperors and the Hungarian kings between its windows and entrances.

At the end of the 17th century Imre Thököly attempted to capture the castle but did not succeed. In 1678, when owned by Adam Forgáč, the castle was besieged again, on this occasion by Turks. The defenders repulsed this attack and also a second attempt in 1703. Six years later Ferenc II Rákóczi overran the castle and in another siege; the leader of the emperor's troops, the General Sigbert Heister, managed to raze parts of the building including the roof and some of the interior equipment.

The Forgáčs had the castle reconstructed in 1762 due to the need of a representative seat in this region. The Austrian Andre Meyerhoffer, was in charge of the works, notable as he was the builder of some of the palaces in Bratislava.

In 2006, the castle was sold to a development company from Košice who repaired it and made it into a 4 star hotel with a spa.

== Population ==
Population statistic (10 years)
Year	1995	2005	2015	2025
Count	1563	1685	1638	1687
Difference		+7.80%	−2.78%	+2.99%

Population statistic
Year	2024	2025
Count	1656	1687
Difference		+1.87%

It has a population of 1687 people (31 December 2025).

=== Ethnicity ===
Census 2021 (1+ %)
Ethnicity	Number	Fraction
Slovak	1587	95.48%
Not found out	55	3.3%
Total	1662	

In year 2021 was 1662 people by ethnicity 1587 as Slovak, 55 as Not found out, 16 as Hungarian, 12 as Ukrainian, 10 as Romani, 4 as Czech, 2 as Italian, 2 as Austrian, 2 as Other, 1 as Vietnamese, 1 as Rusyn, 1 as Russian, 1 as German and 1 as Greek.

Note on population: The difference values of population numbers in the table "Population statistic" and in the sections "Ethnicity" & "Religion" is caused by the use of various statistical methods.

=== Religion ===
Census 2021 (1+ %)
Religion	Number	Fraction
Roman Catholic Church	973	58.54%
None	353	21.24%
Evangelical Church	225	13.54%
Not found out	72	4.33%
Total	1662	

In year 2021 was 1662 people by religion 973 from Roman Catholic Church, 353 from None, 225 from Evangelical Church, 72 from Not found out, 14 from Ad hoc movements, 10 from Eastern Orthodox Church, 3 from Greek Catholic Church, 2 from Other and not ascertained christian church, 2 from Other, 2 from United Methodist Church, 1 from Jewish community, 1 from Calvinist Church, 1 from Paganism and natural spirituality, 1 from Jehovah's Witnesses, 1 from Buddhism and 1 from Apostolic Church.

== Genealogical resources ==
The records for genealogical research are available at the state archive "Statny Archiv in Banska Bystrica, Slovakia"

- Roman Catholic church records (births/marriages/deaths): 1800-1895 (parish B)
- Lutheran church records (births/marriages/deaths): 1800-1895 (parish B)

== See also ==
- List of municipalities and towns in Slovakia
