= Ottó Herman =

Hungarian zoologist, ethnographer, archaeologist, and politician

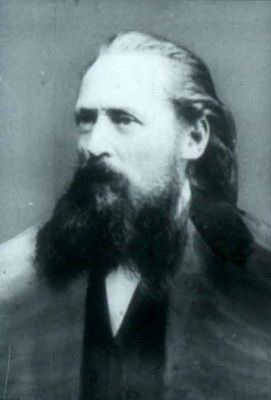
- Born: 26 June 1835; Breznóbánya, Kingdom of Hungary, Austrian Empire
- Died: 27 December 1914 (aged 79); Budapest, Kingdom of Hungary, Austria-Hungary
- Scientific career
- Fields: Ornithology, arachnology

Ottó Herman born Herrmann Károly Ottó (26 June 1835 – 27 December 1914) was a Hungarian zoologist, ethnographer, archaeologist, journalist and politician. A polymath recognized as a pioneer of Hungarian natural history research, he made numerous studies on Hungarian spiders, birds, and fishes, and founded the journal Natural History Notebooks and the ornithological journal Aquila. He is called "the Father of the birds" in Hungary. A member of several learned societies including the Royal Hungarian Society of Natural History, Hungarian Linguistics Society, Hungarian Society of Ethnography, he was elected to the Hungarian Parliament. The Ottó Herman Museum of Miskolc was named after him.

== Biography ==
Herrman was born in Breznóbánya, Kingdom of Hungary (now Brezno, Slovakia) into a Zipser German family. His father Károly Herrmann was a surgeon in the mines and his mother Franciska Ganzstuck was from Hammersberg. He started his schooling at the Lutheran Gymnasium in Miskolc where a major influence was Károly Máday. He worked as an apprentice to a locksmith in Miskolc and then in Korompán. He studied engineering in Vienna, however, due to the death of his father he couldn't finish his studies. At age 14 he wanted to join the Hungarian revolutionaries of 1848 but was sent home because he couldn't provide a letter of his father's consent. He dropped Karoly from his name and dropped the German spelling of Herrmann in favour of Herman.

His father had already been interested in ornithology and was in touch with C. L. Brehm, Naumann and Salamon János Petényi. Even as a child he enjoyed the forest and studying birds, often going into the beech forests of Bükk. He often suffered from colds and earaches and began to lose his hearing from an early age. In 1853 he sought to join the polytechnic in Vienna but the death of his father led to his discontinuation.

From 1854 to 1856 he worked as a locksmith in a Viennese company and during his spare time he visited the Museum of Natural History. Here he met Brunner von Wattenwyll who got him to illustrate his orthoptera. He taught himself whatever he was interested in including zoological (ornithological, ichthyological), speleological, archaeological and ethnographic sources. He did not appear for conscription assuming that he would be dismissed due to his deafness and this resulted in his being punished with 12 years of military service. In 1859 he was posted to the Austrian-Italian front and discharged after four years, at the age of 26.

In 1863 Herman, János Dax, and János Wagner established a photography studio in Kőszeg but this partnership broke down and he subsequently avoided photography and preferred to use his own illustrations in all his works. He however met Kálmán Chernél who taught him taxidermy.

He married writer Kamilla Borosnyay in 1885. In 1914 he was hit by a horse carriage in Budapest and suffered a fracture of the femur. Complications led to pneumonia and he died at his home on December 27. He was buried two days later at the Kerepesi Cemetery and in 1965 his remains were moved to the Miskolc-Hámor Cemetery according to his wishes.

== Scientific work ==
In 1864 Herman applied for a conservator position at the Transylvanian Museum Association. The association operated under modest circumstances; the aging head of the Department of Natural Sciences, Sámuel Brassai, managed the collection in Kolozsvár (now Cluj-Napoca) with a single employee. He offered one third of his annual salary of 1000 Forints to hire a conservator. Herman submitted a prepared abino skylark and a stuffed ermine, accompanied by a letter of support from Kálmán Chernel. On 6 April 1864, Brassai announced that he hired an individual from Kőszeg at his own expense.

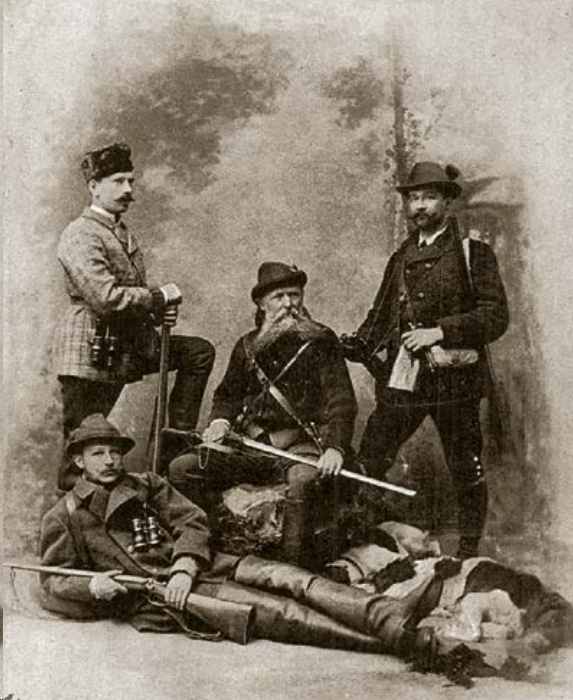
Herman with fellow bird observers, c. 1891

Herman's multifaceted scientific work and political engagement began with the period 1864–1872 in Kolozsvár. He produced his first major scientific work here on the Eurasian hobby, which was published in 1865 under the title "Falco subbuteo Linné". He wrote a number of popular works in Kolozsvár, for example, "The Art of the Spider" appeared in the 1866 Kolozsvár Almanach. Brassai and Herman had were almost identical in appearance. both wearing shoulder length hair and long beards. The striking exterior masked people who wanted to know and experience everything, especially the life of animals in natural surroundings. However, the two scientists did not share the same character: Brassai loved to spend time on the details, while Herman sought out great generalizations, delving into details only to support his arguments. Herman wrote to the newspapers Ellenzék and Magyar Polgár for some time contributing even to the theatre column. One of his friends was Mari Jászai.

He collected widely taking an interest in insects, minerals and archaeology. He travelled to Norway with Adolf Lendl in 1888. He was the first person who stated that cavemen lived in Hungary in the past after examining the chopping tools found in the area surrounding Miskolc. His best known works are Spider Faunas of Hungary, Birds Useful and Birds Harmful and the Book of Hungarian Fishery. Herman was a founding figure in Hungarian palaeolithic research and Hungarian speleology. He initiated the Natural History Notebooks and was its editor for 10 years until 1886. He also founded and edited the ornithological review Aquila until the end of his life. Herman established and directed the Hungarian Ornithological Centre, at the time a department of the Hungarian National Museum. He was one of the founding members of the Hungarian Society of Ethnography. He collaborated with Gyula Pungur, going on collecting trips to examine crickets. He would later encourage Pungur to write a monograph.

Herman did not strive for popularity and despised those scientists who searched out unknown species to have their name remembered in the academic world. Instead, he tried to look for relationships and publish his experiences for the benefit ordinary people. In order to enrich the collection of the Transylvanian Museum, he performed several field trips, for example to the Székely region and the Transylvanian Plain. As a result of his work the zoological collections was becoming more and more rich and notable. He also collected minerals and is noted for his findings of syenite és a ditroite.

In 1869 he found his position in the museum difficult and left the museum on March 4, 1871. After this he supported himself with his journalism, starting a new column "Új Erdélyi Múzeum" and joining the editorial staff of the Neue Freie Presse. The career was difficult and he considered joining Carl Brunner who planned African zoological expedition to Cameroon. The Hungarian Natural History Society, thanks to the efforts of Kálmán Szily and János Frivaldszky, counter-offered with a multi-year scholarship to retain him. He was employed by the Hungarian National Museum in 1875 to produce a monograph on the domestic spider fauna, in which he provided descriptions of 328 species of spiders including 36 new ones. This monograph on spiders, appeared in 1875, 1877, and 1878 along with his own illustrations. The three-volume work was all the more popular abroad as the first and the second volumes were written in both Hungarian and German. The third volume was written in Hungarian only, with a German summary in the appendix. The bilingualism of the work was of great importance, since until then most scientific treatises were published in German. These results allowed the Hungarian publications to be read abroad, while serving to establish Hungarian as a language of scientific discourse. In 1891 he was involved in organizing the 2nd International Ornithological Congress in Budapest.

== Legacy ==
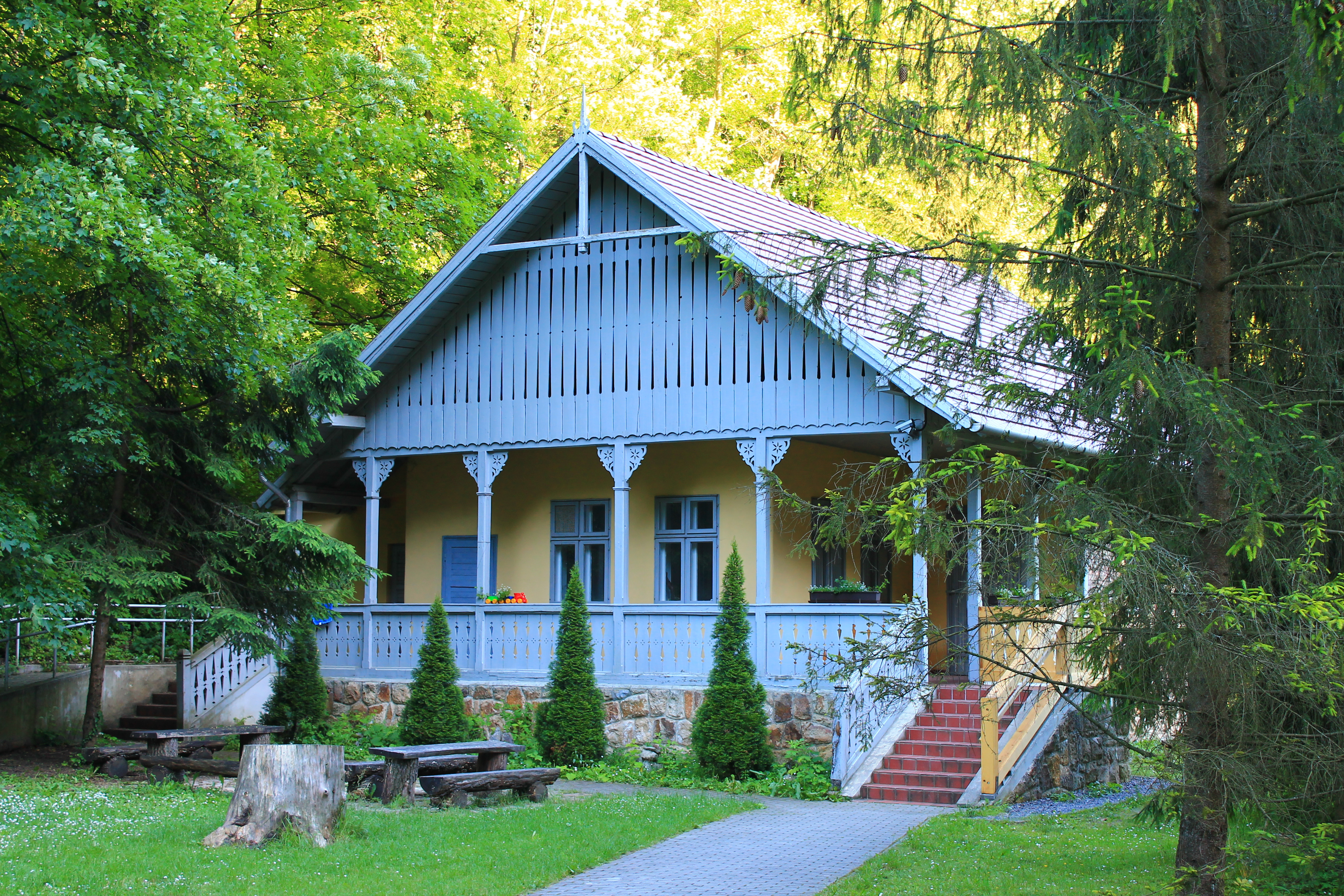
Ottó Herman's holiday home in Lillafüred, Hungary

Herman was the author of an enormous quantity of valuable scientific works, totaling 5940 pages. He published 14 books as well as 1140 articles and lectures. He identified 36 new spider species. Today, many schools and institutions bear his name, including one of the largest high schools in Miskolc, the Ottó Herman Gimnázium. In 1953, the museum of Borsod-Miskolc chose Ottó Herman Museum as its name. In 1960, the Hungarian Post issued a commemorative stamp in honour of the 125th anniversary of the birth of Ottó Herman; the stamp was designed by graphic artists József Vertel and László Kékesi. The Ottó Herman Medal was created in 1962 to recognize Hungarian karst and cave explorers. In 1915, the Herman Ottó cave west of Miskolc was named in tribute to the polymath scientist. A lake bearing his name forms part of the Orfű lake system in Baranya county. The Plant Protection Research Institute of the Academy is located in a street named after him in Budapest's II. district.

A species of lace bug, Lasiacantha hermani (Vásárhelyi, 1977) bears his name.

His former home built in 1890 in Lillafüred, which he called "Pele-house", was a tourist hut bearing his name, and is now known as Ottó Herman Memorial House. It is now the home of two permanent exhibitions presenting the scientist's life, as well as the wildlife of the Bükk Mountains. In accordance with Herman's will, his remains were moved from Budapest to Miskolc in 1965 and placed in the Hámori cemetery. His tomb is marked by Miklós Varga's sculpture. In remembrance of his accomplishment, the Ottó Herman National Biology competition is held biannually in Hungary. The City Council of Miskolc has created the Ottó Herman Scientific Award, which is presented annually as part of a celebrations of the City of Miskolc. The first honoree in 2001 was museum curator Lászlo Kárpáti. The year 2014 marked the 100th anniversary of Herman's death; the National Environment Institute organized Herman Otto Commemorative Year at the national level, to honour the scientist and his work. As part of the anniversary celebration, the City Council of Miskolc posthumously awarded honorary citizenship to Herman.

Herman's nephew Jenő Vadas established forestry research in Hungary.

Starting December 2014, Duna Television broadcast a four-part documentary about the life of the scientist, entitled Ottó Herman, the Last Hungarian Polymath.
