= Christian Andreas Zipser =

Hungarian mineralogist, naturalist, and teacher (1783-1864)

Christian Andreas Zipser, Kristián Andrej Zipser or Zipser Keresztély András (25 November 1783 – 20 February 1864) was a Hungarian mineralogist, naturalist, and school teacher. He collected mineral specimens across Hungary and wrote a book on mineralogy. The bismuth mineral Zipserite is named in his honour.

== Life and work ==
Zipser was born in Győr and after school in Bazin (Bösing ) he studied philosophy and theology at Banská Bystrica, and at the evangelical lyceum in Bratislava. He then went to the University of Jena and received a doctorate in 1803 after which he taught at a Protestant school in Brno but this school was closed after the Battle of Austerlitz (1805). He then worked as an accountant at a cloth factory in Brno, the Schäferische Feintuchfabrik. In 1807 he moved back home as his father was ill and taught at a school for girls in Bistritabánya. Around 1809 he founded his own institution for the education of girls where he taught natural history. He ran this until his wife's death in 1859. His pedagogy was influenced by Christian Carl André who had taught alongside him in Brno. In his spare time he travelled across the region examine minerals. He also took an interest in entomology, describing the apollo butterfly. He accompanied A. S. Herder through Hungary in 1813, F.S. Beudant in 1818, G. G. Pusch in 1821, and L. Zejszner in 1840. He also accompanied King Friedrich August II in 1840 into the High Tatras and corresponded with many scientists around Europe including Alexander von Humboldt. He worked on a mineralogical handbook for Hungary which was published in 1817. He followed the system of Abraham Gottlob Werner for names of minerals, having obtained a manuscript from Heinrich Moritz von Mandelsloh. He promoted the study of geology particularly with the view of its application to mining for ores. During the 8th Congress of Hungarian physicians and naturalists on 11 August 1847 at Sopron, Zipser proposed the setting up of a mining and geological society. The chair was Prince Pál Esterházy who offered 400 silver forints a year to support the society. The society was then organized by the Kubinyi brothers - Agoston and Ferenc Kubinyi - who were former students of Zipser. He was present in the meeting in Videfalva on 3 January 1848 along with the Kubinyis and others which led to the founding of the Hungarian Geological Association which was formally established only on 1 December 1849 with Haidinger as director. Zipser's collection were purchased after his death by the forestry academy at Schemnitz. His collection originally included 12000 mineral samples from around the world but had been damaged in a fire in Neusohl in 1846.
