= Pusch =

Pusch is a German surname. Notable people with the surname include:

- Alexander Pusch (born 1955), German fencer
- Georg Gottlieb Pusch (1790-1846), German geologist
- Kolja Pusch (born 1993), German soccer player
- Lada Pusch (born 2008), German rhythmic gymnast
- Lotte Pusch (1890–1983), German physical chemist
- Luise F. Pusch (born 1944), German linguist.
- Lukas Pusch (born 1970), Austrian artist
