= Opoka =

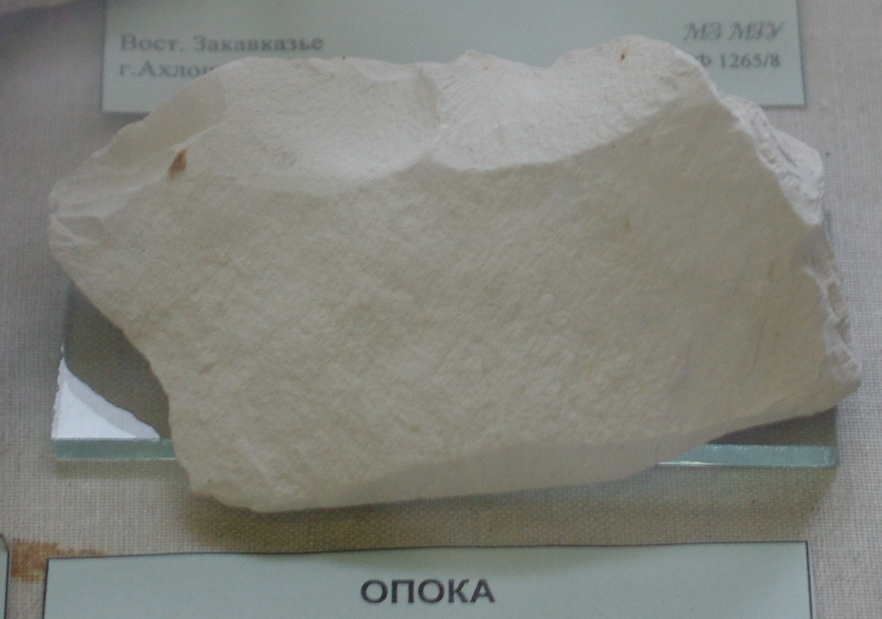

Opoka is a carbonate-siliceous marine sedimentary rock. It was formed during the Upper Cretaceous epoch and mainly found in the Great European Plain regions.

Opoka was first described in literature by Georg Gottlieb Pusch in 1833, who named it as Polnische Opoka.
