= Ferenc Kubinyi =

Hungarian noble and politician (1796–1874)

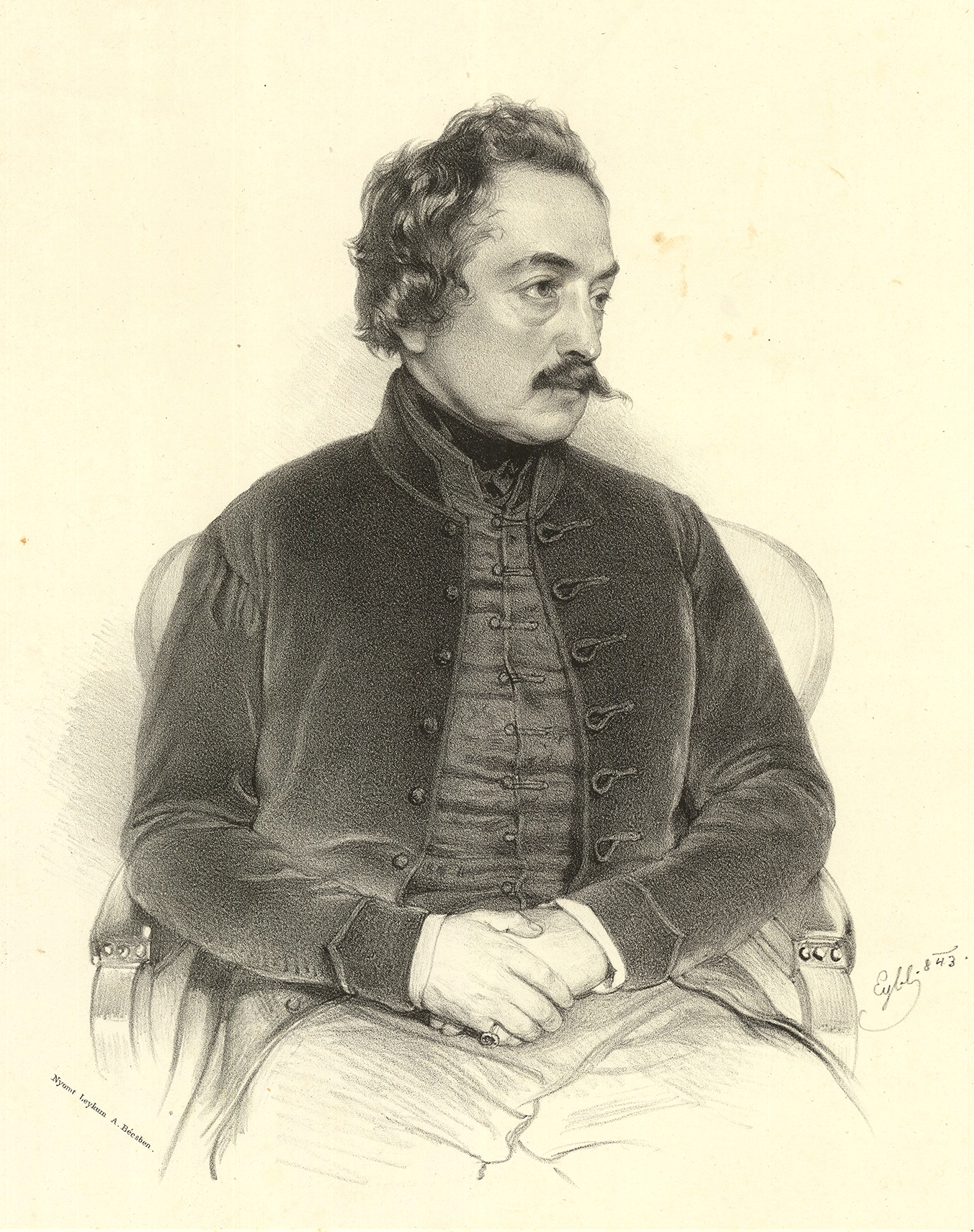

Ferenc Kubinyi (21 March 1796 – 28 March 1874) was a Hungarian noble, notary, paleontologist, geologist and politician. He was involved in the growth and establishment of the Hungarian Geological Society and, along with his brother Agoston Kubinyi, of the Hungarian National Museum. The museum at the castle of Szécsény is named after him as the Kubinyi Ferenc Museum.

Kubinyi was born in Videfalva, the son of András Kubínyi de Felsőkubin and Éva Amália Prónay de Tótpróna et Blatnicza. He was the brother of Ágoston Kubinyi and from an early age the brothers began to take an interest in natural history and collecting. Their teachers in Banská Bystrica included Christian Andreas Zipser and János Salamon Petényi who created an interest in natural history. He then studied law at Debrecen and Pest. He became a notary in 1821 and later became a judge in Nógrád county. He attended parliament from 1825 as an ambassador and joined the liberal opposition in the 1840s, representing Losonc district in 1848. His support for a revolution led to a nine-year prison sentence but he was pardoned in 1852. From 1861 he was a parliament member for Losonc. He founded and organized the Hungarian physicians and naturalists meetings and took an interest in scientific research. In 1848 he was involved in the establishment of the Hungarian Geological Society. He was elected to the Hungarian Academy of Sciences in 1858. In 1862 he visited Constantinople. He excavated a petrified tree in Ipolytarnóc about which he wrote in 1842. The tree named as Petrefactum giganteum Humboldtii (now considered a Pinuxylon) and locally known as "gyurtyánkő lóczá" was being used as a bridge over a stream. He also collected fossils. He donated to the establishment of the Hungarian National Museum which his brother Agoston headed. A collection of eggs and minerals that he and his brother had built up at Masaryk Street was destroyed. He also supported the Losonc city library after the city was destroyed in a fire.
