= Kubinyi =

House of Kubinyi
- Ancient Noble House
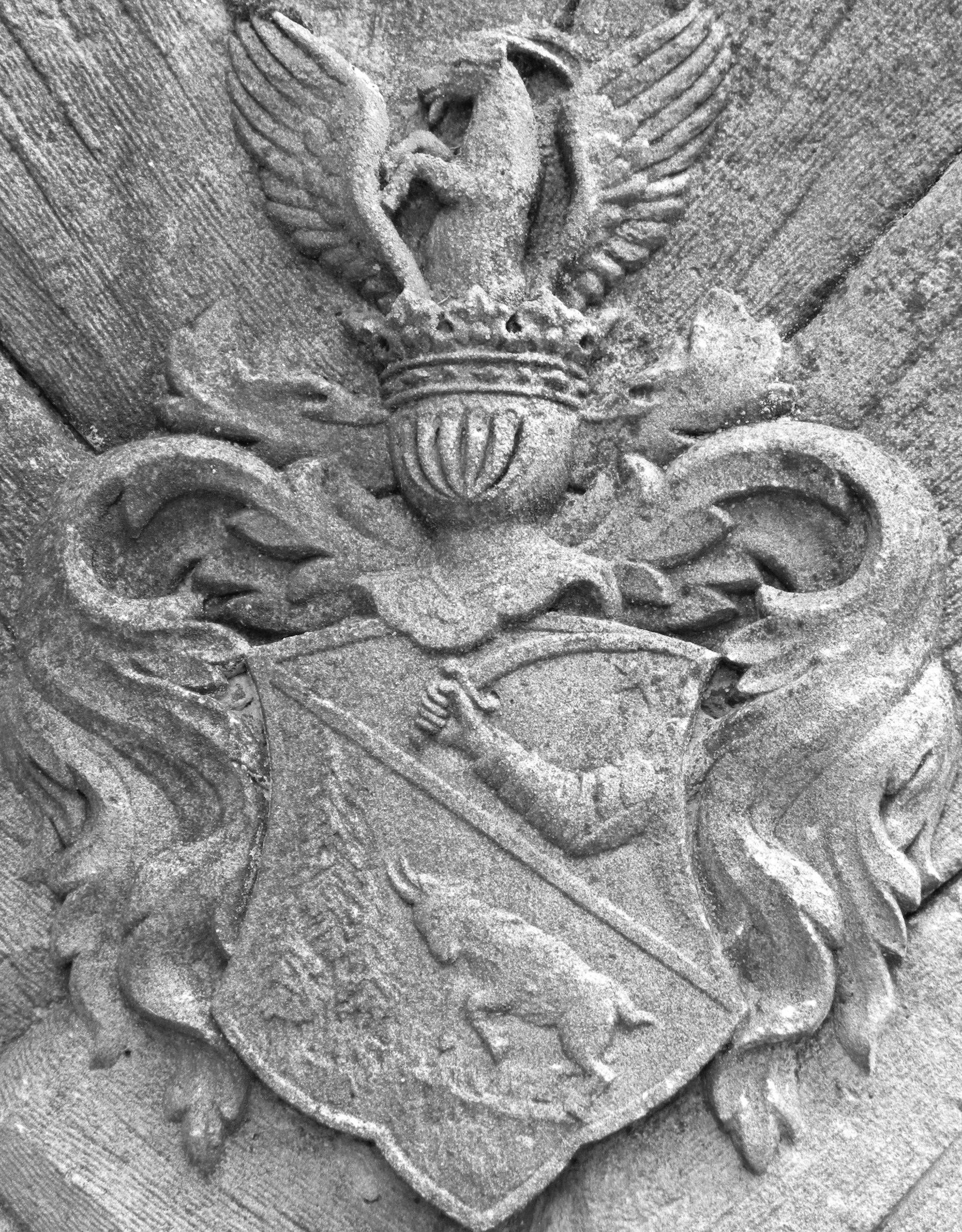
- Country: Kingdom of Hungary
- Current region: Hungary
- Origin: Magyar Tribes
- Founded: Árpádian Age
- Founder: Ithe
- Historic seat: Gedő castle and Lordship
- Titles: Ősnemes (Ancient noble); Primor; Count (Ispán); Count of the Royal Chamber (Kamaragróf); Alispán; Nemes
- Styles: Főúr (Great lord); Fő-nemes (Highnoble); de Felső-Kubinyi; de Felső-Kubiny; Méltóságos (illustrissimus); Nagyságos (magnificus)
- Connected families: Mesko de Felső-Kubinyi
- Properties: Major historic properties include: Gedő castle & lordship; Patha castle & lordship; Damásd castle & lordship; Deregnyő castle & lordship; Ajnácskő castle & lordship; Büdy castle & lordship; Ráhó castle & lordship; Zagyvafő castle (in ruins) & lordship; Krasznahorka castle & lordship (16th century); Záblát Lordships (16th century); Dobóruszka lordships (16th century); Gold, silver and copper mines in Liptó county
- Cadet branches: Felsőkubini; Deményfalvi; Nagy-olaszi
- * Primor: Monumenta Comitialia regni Hungariae 1. 1526–1536 (Budapest: 1874). 100-101.: Főúr: Bárczi, G., & Országh, L. (Eds.). (1959–1962). Főúr. In A magyar nyelv értelmező szótára. Akadémiai Kiadó / MTA Nyelvtudományi Intézete. Arcanum Kézikönyvtár.; Fő-nemes: Czuczor, G., & Fogarasi, J. (1862–1874). Főnemes. In A magyar nyelv szótára. Magyar Tudós Társaság. Arcanum Kézikönyvtár.; Méltóságos and Nagyságos: Szegedi, László. "Megszólítások." Heraldikai lexikon, Wikikönyvek, 2006, hu.wikibooks.org/wiki/Heraldikai_lexikon/Megszólítások. Accessed 30 Sept. 2026.

The Kubinyi family is one of the oldest surviving Hungarian noble houses. The exact age of the family remains unknown; however, its noble status predates the 13th century. The earliest securely documented member of the family was Ithe, a wealthy Hungarian nobleman, although the historian Horvát István believed him to be the son of Hudkont, who was born around 1170-1190 AD. The earliest record of Hudkont is from the year 1222 AD, where he was recorded as the count of Liptó county. He lived during the reign of King Andrew II. In 1233, he was granted the estate of Reucha in Liptó County by the king in recognition of his faithful service from his earliest youth, as stated in the royal charter of donation.

Throughout the centuries, members of the Kubinyi family often served as generals and commanders and held important judicial positions in the Kingdom of Hungary. During the 15th and 16th centuries, the family held a seat on the Royal Council (and later the Hungarian Council) and participated actively in the Hungarian Diet. They were also involved in major national events, including the Bocskai Uprising, the Magnate Conspiracy, the Revolution and War of Independence of 1848–49, and the Great War. Their service included positions as royal officials, diplomats, and members of the Hungarian Parliament, with most members taking part in the wars against the Ottoman Empire. In later centuries, the family also made notable contributions to Hungarian science and culture.

Their social standing is reflected in their matrimonial alliances, with members of the Kubinyi family frequently marrying with the wealthiest Hungarian noble families, including the Eszterházy, Andrássy and Festetics families. Particularly significant was the marriage with the Mérey family, through which the Kubinyis became descendants of the Árpád dynasty, with their lineage tracing back through the Mérey line to Álmos, dated to around 820 AD.

They held extensive estates throughout the Kingdom of Hungary, including the lordships and castles of Gedő, Zagyvafő, Damásd, Pata, Ajnácskő, and Deregnyő, as well as gold, silver, and copper mines throughout the kingdom. In addition, they possessed substantial estates in the counties of Somogy, Zala, Pest, Zemplén, Liptó and Nógrád.

== Major castles ==
- Gedő castle
- Patha castle
- Damásd castle
- Deregnyő castle
- Ajnácskő castle
- Büdy castle
- Ráhó castle
- Zagyvafő castle (in ruins)
- Krasznahorka castle (lost due to lack of heirs)

== Ancient estates ==
Estates in Zemplén county: Deregnyő castle, and part estates of: Kulcs, Hosszúmező, Kisfalu, Körtvélyes, Harklócz, Kucsin, Izbugya, Hrabócz, Radván, Alsó and Felső-Harbok, Béla, Valentócz, Volicza, Sztrekovicz, Czabolovcz, Vitává, Zbonya, Rakitó, Jablonya, Gálszécs, Kacsáncz, Zelmencz, Palin, Ubris and Klasán territories.

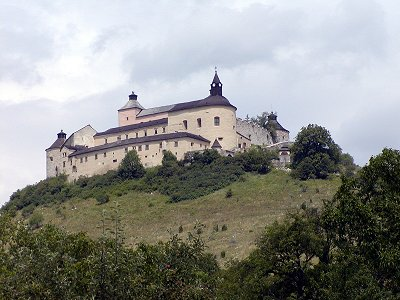
Krasznahorka castle

Estates in Liptó county: Deménfalva, Pepernyik puszta, Hlinik (rb.), Madacsán, Patak, Bessenyőfalva (rb.), Nagy-Olaszi, Fiacsicze, Dubrava, Verbó, Bertelenfalva, Vidafölde, Szent-Anna (Almanfalva), Váralja, Jánosháza, Parizsháza (Mezőháza), Lehota, Alsó-Rásztok, Bobrovnyik (Hódászfalva), Tvarozsna, Német-Lipcse, Kormos, Moysfalva (rb.).

Estates in Bérég county: Homok, Munkács (rb.), Meseszeg, Bodolló, Nagy- és Kis-Surány, Monokpapi, Barkasszó, Dávidháza, Kerecsen, Adony, Vid, Szalka, Atya, Czoroda, Deda, Girsano, Sápon, Kászon, Eszternye, Barrobás (rb.).

Estates in Nógrád county: Zagyvafő castle, with Zagyvafő, Garáb, Korláthfalu and Szenterzsébet territories, and Inaz plains, Ebeczk, Pogony (rb.), Videfalva, Piliny, Karans-Ságh, MálasMedgyes, Kelecsény, F.-Kovácsi, Bolyk, Petőfalva.

Estates in Szepes county: Kaczwinkel, Sunyava, Bethlenfalva, Hozelecz, Gánfalva, Filefalva, Huoran and Thronfalva, Kisfalva, Görgő, Harho, Olsavicza, F.-Répás, Krigh, Rokusz territories and plains.

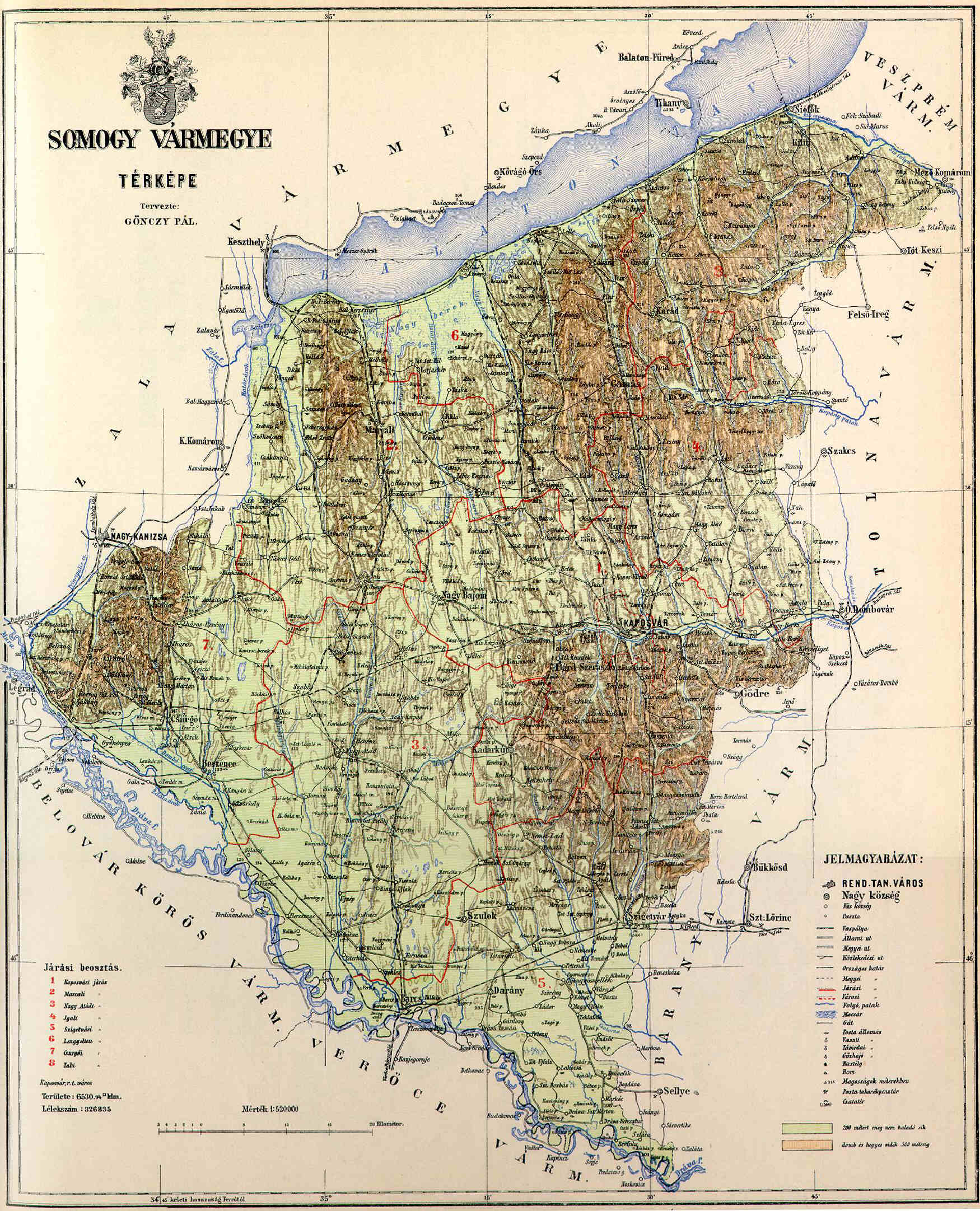
Somogy county

Estates in Trencsén county: Part estates in the Beczkói, Kaszavári and Ledniczei lordships (Lehotka, Horócz, Jaczkó, Ihricze, Dohnan, Dubkova, Moszticz), Hrabova, Hlinik Horka, Závoda, Mois (rb.).

Estates in Szabolcs county: Tisza-Eszlár, Mihálydi, Petneháza, Zakoly, Bűd, Rakamáz, Gelsa, Nádudvar, Balsa (rb.).

Estates in Somogy county: Patha castle with the Patha lordship, Patha city and the territories of Poklosi, Molvány, Keresztút, Basal, Veget, Erdőalja together with all villages and plains.

Estates in Nyitra county: Zelena, Szőllős, Thurcza, Málnapataka, Bisztricska, Nyitraszegh, Bisztricsény, Emőke, Vágszerdahely with (rb.).

Estates in Pest county: Mácsa, Ecskend, Tápió-Szt.-Márton, Tatár-Szentgyörgy, Zsidó, Oszlár, Kemperd, Arkos-Berczel, Szilvás-Berczel.

Estates in Hont county: Felső-Palojta, Szuhány, Csab (rb.), Kővár, Bátorfalva, Cséri (rb.).

Estates in Árva county: Felső-Kubin, Malatina, Alsó-Felső-Stepanó, Isztebne (rb.) and Laukó.

Estates in Borsod county: Múcsony, Kazincz, Igricz, Harnócz.

Estates in Kishont county: Nyustya, Klenócz, and half of the city of Tiszolcz.

Estates in Vas county: Part estates in the settlements of Tropolócz, Domanince and Sztrúkócz belonging to Lindva castle.

Estates in Sáros county: Tizsite, Eperjes (rb.).

Estates in Abaúj county: Felső-Kázsmárk (rb.).

Estates in Gömör county: Gedő castle with Gedőalja, Gömöri, Kisfalva, Csókfalva, Dúsa, Geszthete, Simonfalva and Lech, villages and plains.

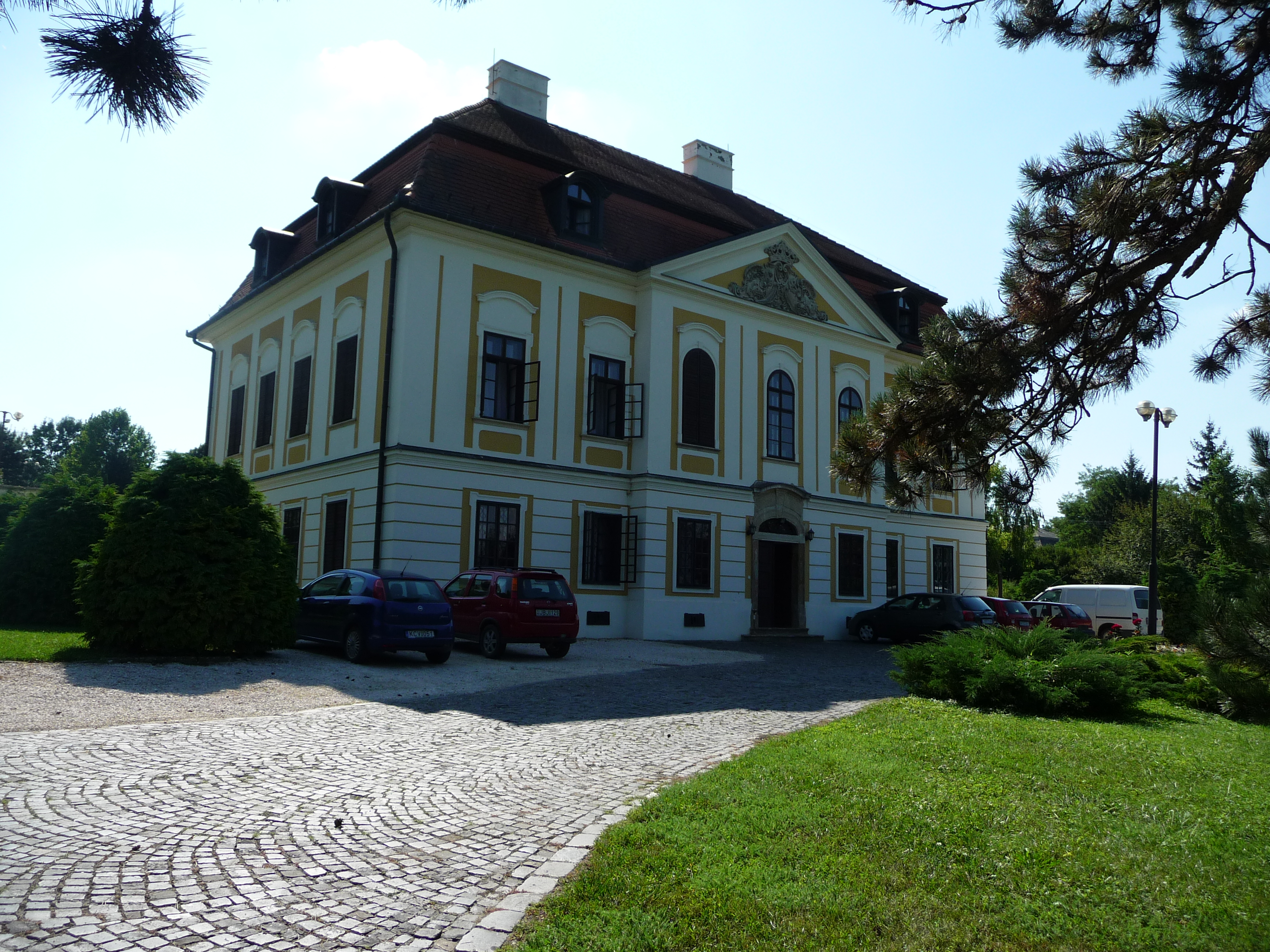
Historical Szentmiklossy- Kubinyi manor in Erdőtarcsa

Estates in Györ county: Balog.

Estates in Heves county: Csány (rb.).

Estates in Jász-Nagy kun-Szolnok county: Tisza-Nána.

Estates in Torna county: Egerszeg.

Estates in Ung county: Csap and part estates in the Dobó-Ruszkai lordship.

Estates in Szatmár county: Batisz, Udvari, Kölese, Cseke, Milota, Hülesd, Szeberén (rb.).

== House of Kubinyi during the Campaigns of Louis the Great ==
Salamon I of the Kubinyi family was a fourteenth-century Hungarian nobleman. Contemporary sources referred to him as literatus de Felsew-Kwbyn (“Salamon, the learned man of Felső-Kubin”). The designation literatus indicated his education and familiarity with the legal and administrative practices of the period.

Salamon was active during the reign of Louis I of Hungary (r. 1342–1382) and participated in a number of the king's military campaigns in Central, Eastern, and Southern Europe. In 1354, he commanded royal forces in Ruthenia, where Hungary, Poland, and Lithuania competed for control and influence over territories including Halych and Volhynia. Salamon is recorded as having besieged and captured Halych during the campaign.

== House of Kubinyi during the battle of Mohács and the Hungarian Civil Wars ==
=== The Battle of Mohács ===
Several members of the Kubinyi family participated in the Battle of Mohács in 1526. Máté (Alispán of Árva county), the eldest of the brothers, Lénárd, lord of Gedő Castle, and Márk II survived the battle. Their brother Dániel (commander of the county banderium from Liptó County), and Salamon II died in battle.

=== The Hungarian Civil Wars ===
Following the death of King Louis II at Mohács, Hungary was divided between two kings, John Zápolya and Ferdinand of Habsburg, each elected by a different faction of the Hungarian nobility. Máté initially supported John, but changed allegiance after Zápolya entered into an alliance with the Ottoman Empire and subsequently joined Ferdinand's forces. Máté and his sons, György II and Benedek I, participated in military campaigns against the Ottomans.

Dániel's son, Kristóf (among the first Directors of the Holy Crown), began participating in the campaigns against the Ottoman Empire in 1527. He fought at his own expense under the family's insignia, financed initially by the family's holdings and later by the income from the gold, silver, and copper mines he acquired. He took part in most of the major campaigns of the period.

He had initially begun studying law, but the political and military conflicts following the Battle of Mohács led him to enter military service. In 1527, at the age of twenty-five, he travelled to the southern frontier and took part in the fighting in Slavonia during the civil war between the supporters of Ferdinand and John Zápolya. Kristóf's first campaigns were fought in the conflict between Ferdinand and John Zápolya. These campaigns increasingly developed into frontier warfare following the intervention of the Ottoman Empire. In Slavonia, Kristóf fought alongside other powerful lords including Ferenc Batthyány, Miklós Zrínyi, Lukács Székely, Péter Keglevich, and Lajos Pekry. Frangepán captured several of Pekry's castles, but during his withdrawal his forces were attacked by Hungarian troops, who had taken up positions in the surrounding forests. Frangepán's forces suffered a severe defeat.

In subsequent years, Kristóf accompanied Ferdinand's forces in Upper Hungary, where they captured the strategically important Szepesvár from the supporters of John Zápolya, followed by Liptó Castle and Liptóújvár castle in Liptó County. In 1530, under General Wilhelm von Roggendorf, Kristóf participated in the siege of Buda, then held by John Zápolya, although the city was not captured. He fought at the siege of Pest in 1535, and then along Lénárd Vels participated in the defence of Győr against the Ottoman threat in 1540. Following the Ottoman capture of Buda in 1541, he continued fighting on the Hungarian frontier, participating in campaigns around Esztergom and Székesfehérvár. Between 1554 and 1562, Kristóf participated in the campaigns of Palatine Tamás Nádasdy against the Ottomans and the remaining supporters of the Johnite faction.

== The Magnate conspiracy (Wesselényi-összeesküvés) ==
The Kubinyi family was among the noble houses that played a leading role in organizing the Magnate Uprising of 1670. On 9 April 1670, IV. Kubinyi László joined the gathering at the castle of Rákóczi Ferenc I in Sárospatak. The assembly served as a council of war, during which the participants coordinated their opposition to Habsburg rule and laid the foundations for the armed uprising that followed. The families in attendance were Bocskay, Kubinyi, Szuhay, Szepesy, Bornemisza, Forgách, Csérnél, Marczibányi, Komjáthy, Fáy, Kazinczy, Barkó, and Rády.

== English translation of Nagy Iván's 1860 Overview of the Dynasty's History ==
Kubinyi III. Laszlo, Secretary of war, Vice-Treasurer, Royal Chamberlain

One of our most extensive and ancient noble families. Its earliest known ancestor was Hudkont, whom the scholar István Horvát holds to have descended from the Hunt-Pázmán genus (genus). The said Hudkont lived under King Andrew II, and in 1233 was granted by this king—as the charter of donation states—for his loyal services rendered from his earliest youth, the land called Reucha in Liptó County (now the localities of Lower and Upper Revúca in Liptó County).

Hudkont had two sons, Ite, or Juche, or Gyuche, and Gyurke, who was also written as Synik. From the latter descended the Meskó and other families, while from the former descended the Kubínyi family. Thus, already with Hudkont's two sons, the family divided into two branches, while continuing to possess Revúca in Liptó County. In 1325, the three sons of Juche, Miklós, Péter and Fülöp, and likewise the two sons of the other branch, Gyurke or Synik, namely Adorján and Mihály, exchanged Revúca before the Convent of Turóc with Danch, Count of Zólyom, and in return received Felső-Kubin in Árva County, from which place the family subsequently took its name and territorial predicate, the latter being borne jointly with the Meskó family, which likewise uses the predicate of Felső-Kubin.

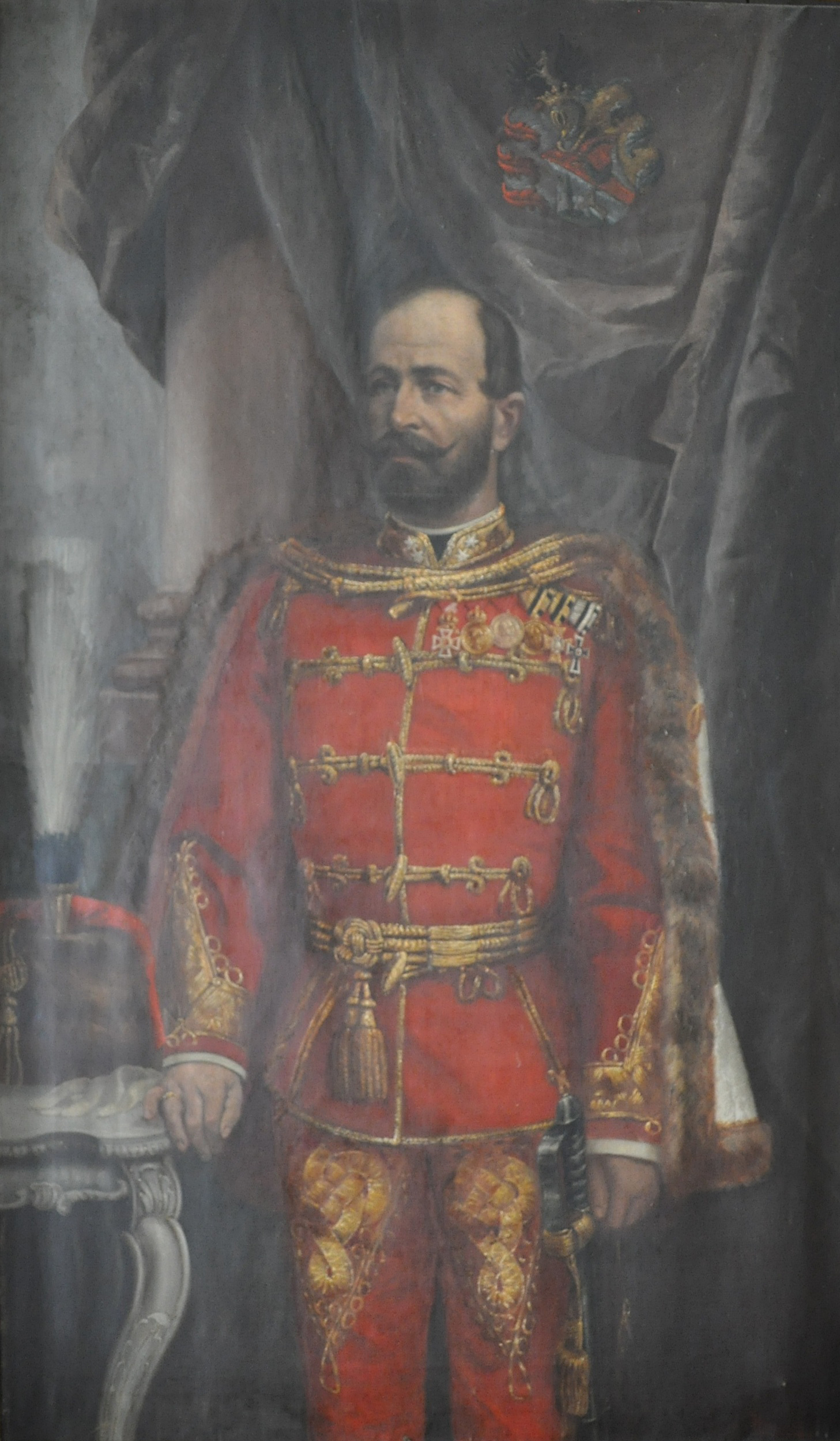
Kubinyi XXV. János, General

In 1355, the grandsons descended from Miklós, son of Juche, namely Márk, Lőrincz, Gergely and Salamon, and the grandsons of Gyurke through his son Adorján, namely Mesk, István and Ivánka, together with János, son of Mihály, received from King Louis I a charter of exchange and donation concerning Felső-Kubin, which had been separated from Árva Castle. This was because King Louis considered it expedient to attach Revúca, situated in Liptó County, to the royal free town of Rozenberg, likewise situated in that county; consequently, pursuant to the writ of installation addressed to the Chapter of Turóc, he solemnly installed the aforesaid persons in possession of the locality of Felső-Kubin in Árva County in the same year, 1355.

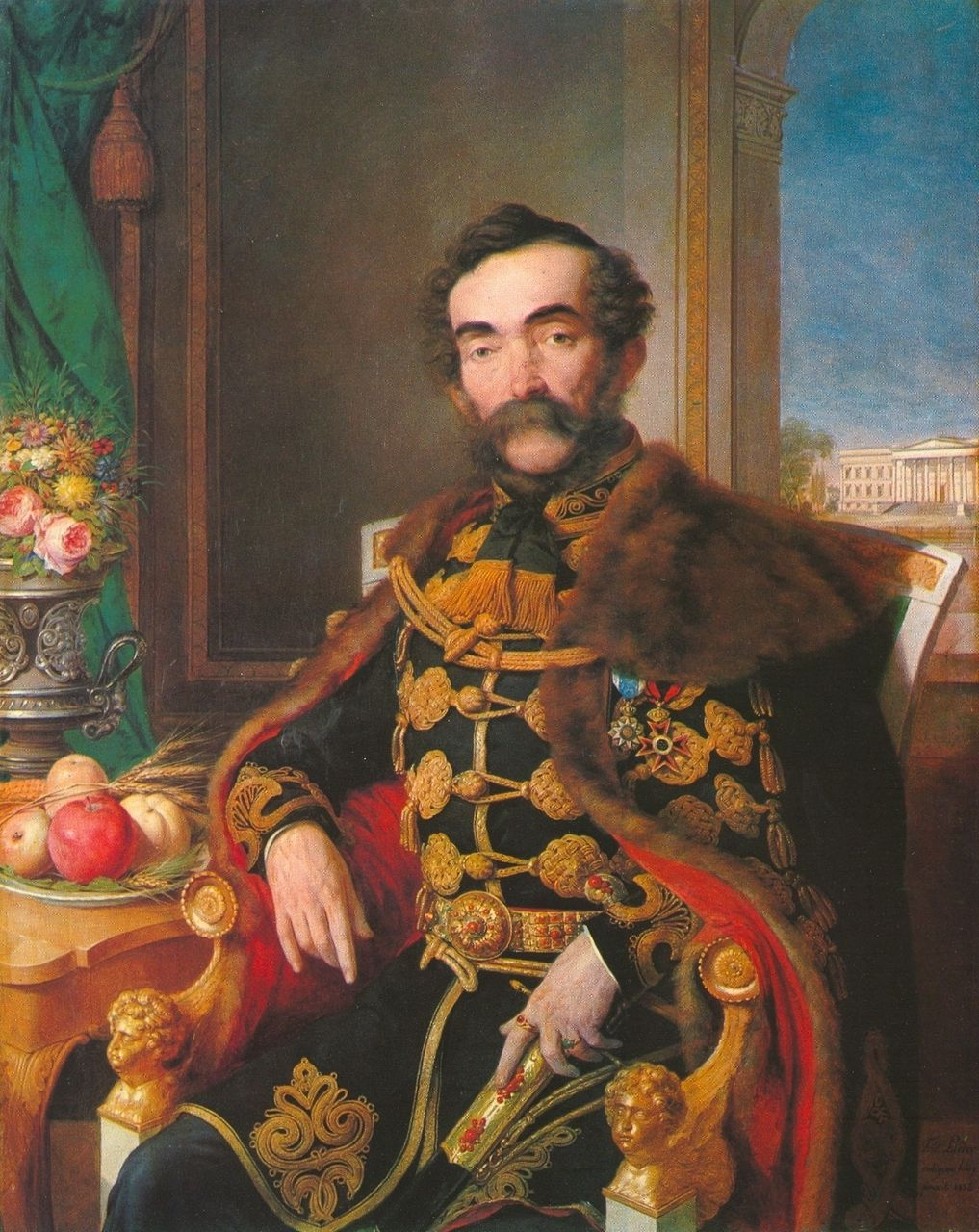
Kubinyi II. Ágoston, first Director of the Hungarian national museum

In 1361, King Louis I likewise transcribed and confirmed the foregoing charter of donation at the request of Salamon and his brother Gergely (sons of Miklós), Miklós, son of Márk, András, son of Lőrincz, Pokus or Fabus, son of Tamás, Balás, son of Fülöp, and, on the branch of Gyurke, Miklós and Benedek, sons of Mesk, István, son of Márton, Péter, son of István, and Miklós, son of János.

In 1391, since Salamon the scholar (litteratus) had killed his brother Márk, the portion of the Felső-Kubin estate belonging to him had to be surrendered as blood-money to Miklós, the son of the murdered Márk, as is proved by the charter of the Convent of Turóc. In the same year, at the estate-investigation court held by Imre Bebek, Judge of the Realm, this charter was produced on behalf of the family by Miklós, son of Márk, Miklós, son of János, and Salamon the scholar, as they no longer possessed any other charters.

In 1424, at the request of András, son of Miklós, son of Gyurke, and his brother László, as well as László, son of Miklós, son of Juche, Márton, son of Bálint, son of Mesk, Mihály and István, sons of Benedek, and János, son of István, King Sigismund confirmed, with regard to Felső-Kubin, the earlier charter of donation granted by King Louis I.

Since, as mentioned, other families descended from the branch of Gyurke or Synik, we shall now leave this branch aside and turn our attention solely to the branch of the Kubínyi family which descended from Juche. In this branch, Miklós, son of the murdered Márk, fathered Péter, who died without issue, and László, whose son György was the common ancestor of the Kubínyi family, which again divided through his sons into two principal branches. This György left six sons; however, only two of them, Dániel and Máté, continued their respective lines, the former becoming the ancestor of the Nagy-Olaszi line, and Máté the progenitor of the Deményfalvi line. Before beginning the discussion of these two lines, however, we must mention the brothers whose branches died out without issue. Among these was László, who, on account of his learning, was also called a scholar (litteratus). In 1492 he was chamberlain-count (de Rivulo Dominarum), in 1497 vice-treasurer, and in 1498 he is mentioned under the title of royal courtier. From 1502 to 1511 he was governor of Buda Castle (Provisor castri Budensis), during which time King Vladislaus II granted him, by royal donation, the ruined Castle of Zagyva in Gömör County together with five villages. In 1497 he obtained the family coat of arms, which—as depicted in the first engraving—is as follows: in the blue field of the shield stands a high rocky mountain, and beside it rises a green pine tree, beneath whose shade, upon the green ground of the valley, a wild goat is grazing. Above the shield stands a helmet surrounded by mantling, and above it is depicted a wild goat similar to that in the shield. Since László had no children by Potentiana Gyulaffy of Ráthót, his branch became extinct.

Salamon and Márk (sons of György) appear to have met their deaths in the Battle of Mohács.

Lénárd was commander of the family’s common castle of Gede when, not long after the Battle of Mohács, Eusták Feledy cunningly and forcibly seized it from him. He had several large and heavy chests, allegedly filled with treasures, brought into the castle, claiming it to be a safer place for them. Lénárd, unaware of the ruse, granted permission; however, the chests contained Feledy’s armed accomplices, who opened the castle gates to Feledy’s forces, allowing them to enter and seize the castle. A lawsuit subsequently arose from this act of violence and plunder, which was initiated by György, son of Máté, and was successfully brought to a conclusion in 1571 by his brother Benedek, as will be mentioned below.

We now come to Dániel I, from whom the Nagy-Olaszi line descended.

One of Dániel’s sons, Jakab, was Alispán of Árva in 1500; his son by Borbála Beniczky, István, was likewise Alispán of Árva in 1571; this branch became extinct with his grandson. Jakab’s other son, Kristóf II, was Alispán and Deputy Treasurer of Trencsén in 1596, and in 1597 was one of the members of the national commission sent to inspect the borders toward Poland. Rakovszky Borbála bore him no male children.

Dániel’s other son, Kristóf I, lived under Kings Ferdinand I, Maximilian and Rudolf. In his younger years he served his country with the sword and received several severe wounds: first on the borders of Slavonia, then, under the command of Rogendorf, in the military operations around Buda; after the fall of Buda, he took part in the engagements at Esztergom and Fehérvár, and subsequently in the siege of Pest; later at Győr under the command of Captain Vels Lenárd; and finally, under the command of Palatine Tamás Nádasdy, he took part in and distinguished himself in several battles. In his advanced age he then devoted himself to the legal profession, first earning distinction as an advocate and later as a royal prosecutor. In 1578, together with his sons, he obtained an augmentation of the family coat of arms, which—as shown in the second engraving—is as follows: the ancient shield is divided diagonally from right to left into two fields; in the lower blue field, between two high rocks, rises a green pine tree, beneath which the wild goat now appears in a leaping position, with a star shining between its horns; while in the upper red field, from the right, an arm clad in armour extends from a cloud and brandishes a drawn sword. Above the shield, from a coronet on the helmet, a wild goat likewise rises between two outspread black eagle wings, with a shining star above its horns. The mantling is silver and red on the right, and gold and blue on the left. Of his children by his two wives:

László began his service in the Chancellery; by 1578 he was already Military Secretary for Upper Hungary, and subsequently became a Councillor of the Chamber. He married Magdolna, daughter of Ferencz Esterházy, Alispán of Pozsony, and sister of the later Palatine Pál Esterházy, who, having been orphaned at an early age, was brought up by Kubiny László in the latter’s castle at Madacsány in Liptó County. László received several donations, including, jointly with Frigyes Pongrácz of Szentmiklós, from King Maximilian the locality of Zelena in Nógrád County and shares in the villages of Szőlős, Turcza, Málnapataka and Malagya; in 1575, from Rudolf, a noble house and vineyards in Eger, shares in the villages of Vata and Cseh in Borsod County, shares in Szentkirály, Czibak and Rérek in Szolnok County, the puszta of Félegyháza in Csongrád County, shares in Nagy-Kőrös, Tápió-Sz.-Márton, Kóka and Almás in Pest County, two curiae in Szabadszállás, the puszta of Borobba-szállása in Solt County, a share in M.-Bénye in Zemplén County, the villages of Miháldi, Petneháza, Zokoly, Büd, Rakomáz, Gelse, Nádudvar and Balsa in Szabolcs County, and a stone house with vineyards in Kassa; and in Gömör County shares in the localities of Hegymegh, Lukovistye, Baluska, Poprocz, Gerlicze, Ratkó and Alsó-Balogh. In 1588 he received by royal donation a share of the estates of Bolyk and Pethőfalva in Nógrád County. Through his sons, among whom Tamás was a representative of Árva, and László was Alispán of Liptó and a representative of the counties of Árva and Liptó, his branch became extinct.

One of László’s brothers, János, was Alispán of Liptó County in 1600 and continued his line through his marriage to Anna Mérey. One of his grandsons, László, husband of Kata Nagy of Lessenye, was a participant in the Wesselényi conspiracy; he fled to Transylvania and forfeited his estates under the stigma of infidelity. Consequently, a large part of the town of Tiszolcz is still held by the Royal Chamber under this forfeiture. The said László was one of those who, in 1673, requested assistance at the Ottoman Porte on behalf of the discontented. In 1678 he joined Thököly, and even after the latter’s downfall in 1685 he maintained himself for some time in the region around Klenócz, until eventually he was again compelled to flee to Transylvania, where he died, and his branch likewise became extinct in his sons.

One of László’s brother János’s grandsons was Ádám, husband of Borbála Plathy. His son János married Judit Bogády, daughter of Miklós Bogády by Ilona Emődy, who, together with her brother Ádám Bogády, divided on 4 February 1692 the estates situated in the localities of N.-Báb, Ürmény, Lipovnik, Dretoma, Hanzlikfalva and Nemcsény. This János probably converted to the Catholic faith, and hence this branch is Catholic. János’s grandson, István, husband of Julianna Gáfor, was an advocate for the Jesuits at Vágszerdahely. Together with his wife he received considerable estates in Bars County, in the localities of Nyitraszegh, Bisztricsány and Vieszka. His grandson András began his official career in Bars County, but died young on 29 April 1831. Among his children by his wife Rozália Tarnóczy were Elek (born 1819), parish priest of the locality of Bolly in Pécs County, deputy dean and district school inspector; his brothers Zsigmond and Sándor were advocates in Nyitra. Their children are shown in the table.

The branch shown in Table III, which may now be called the Nógrád branch, is begun by Gáspár, brother of Ádám. One of his sons was likewise Gáspár, whose wife was Erzsébet Szontagh, of whom it is related that during the time of the bloodthirsty Caraffa she saved Liptó County from his wrath and from the gallows at Eperjes by paying ten thousand florins.

Kubinyi Ferenc museum

In this branch, András (born in Nagy-Olaszi on 4 December 1766), in his youth during the reign of Joseph II, served for four years in Liptó with the institution then called the Subalternum. He subsequently settled in Nógrád County, first on his estate at Videfalva and later at Pilin, and took part in public civil life only within county circles. It was chiefly the Church and education that provided the field in which he earned his greatest merits. As a zealous Evangelical Protestant, he was district inspector of the Nógrád ecclesiastical district for sixteen years. His carefully selected library and his fine collections of old coins and other objects also deserve mention, in which he found his noble recreation. He died at Pilin on 22 March 1851. Among his children: Ferencz began his official career in Nógrád County. From 1828 to 1836 he was Chief Justice of the district of the county; he was a representative at the Diets of 1836 and 1844, and in 1848 a representative in the National Assembly, where he distinguished himself as one of the more prominent speakers of the opposition. In 1849 his fine collection of antiquities at Losoncz was destroyed by the Russians. His brother Ágoston, born on 30 May 1799 at Videfalva, began his official service in Nógrád County in 1821 as a junior secretary, and served there from 1832 to 1842 as Chief Commissioner. In 1837 he was elected inspector of the Nógrád Evangelical ecclesiastical district. At this time he founded the district library and a reading and working society. He established the Nógrád institution intended to promote popular education and the spread of the Hungarian language. In 1841 in Pest, in 1846 in Pécs, and in 1847 in Sopron, he served as vice-president at the meetings of Hungarian physicians and naturalists. In 1843 he was appointed director of the National Museum. At this time the Grand Duke of Hesse honoured him with the first class of the Ludwig Order, the King of Württemberg with the larger gold medal of merit, and the King of Prussia with several gold and silver medals, accompanied by letters written in their own hands. He was elected a member of the botanical society of Regensburg, the natural-scientific society of Nassau, the Mainz-Rhine society, and the natural-scientific society of Saxe-Altenburg; likewise, in 1843, an honorary member of the Hungarian Academy, and in 1853 a full member of its directorate. In 1845 he became an Imperial and Royal Councillor. In 1846 he was elected vice-president of the Hungarian Picture Gallery Association founded at the National Museum, and first president of the Hungarian Natural History Society; likewise, in 1849, he was elected first president of the Hungarian Geological Society. In 1852 he received the third class of the Order of the

Immaculate Conception of Saint Mary of Portugal from Queen Dona Maria da Glória of Portugal. He undertook journeys abroad for scientific purposes, notably in 1843, 1854 and 1857; on the latter occasion he was elected an honorary member of the zoological society in Amsterdam called “Natura Artis Magistra.” In the same year he was presented by Emperor Franz Joseph with a precious diamond ring, and in 1858 was appointed by him Imperial and Royal Chamberlain. In 1859 he became an honorary knight of the Prussian Order of St. John. In the same year he was elected a full member of the Copenhagen Society of Antiquaries and a corresponding member of the Roman Archaeological Society. In addition to all this, he rendered himself considerable services both in connection with the Museum and with other societies. Apart from his smaller writings, his works include: 1. The Poisonous Plants of Hungary, 1842. 2. The Hungarian National Museum, 1848. 3. The Antiquities of Szekszárd, in Hungarian and German, 1857. Following his father’s example and that of others, he had, from his youth, assembled several fine collections, part of which likewise suffered destruction at Videfalva at the hands of the Russians in 1849.

In this same branch, Gáspár held the office of Alispán in Liptó County. He died on 4 May 1838, at the age of 61, at Nagy-Rév in Heves County, and was buried at Karancs-Sághon in Nógrád County. His son László followed his father into the same tomb on 18 October 1840, at the age of 40.

The branch shown in Table IV might for the greater part be called the Liptó County branch, since most of its members reside in that county, with the exception of the branch in Szabolcs County, which descends from Jakab, son of Péter, whose wife was Anna Makláry.

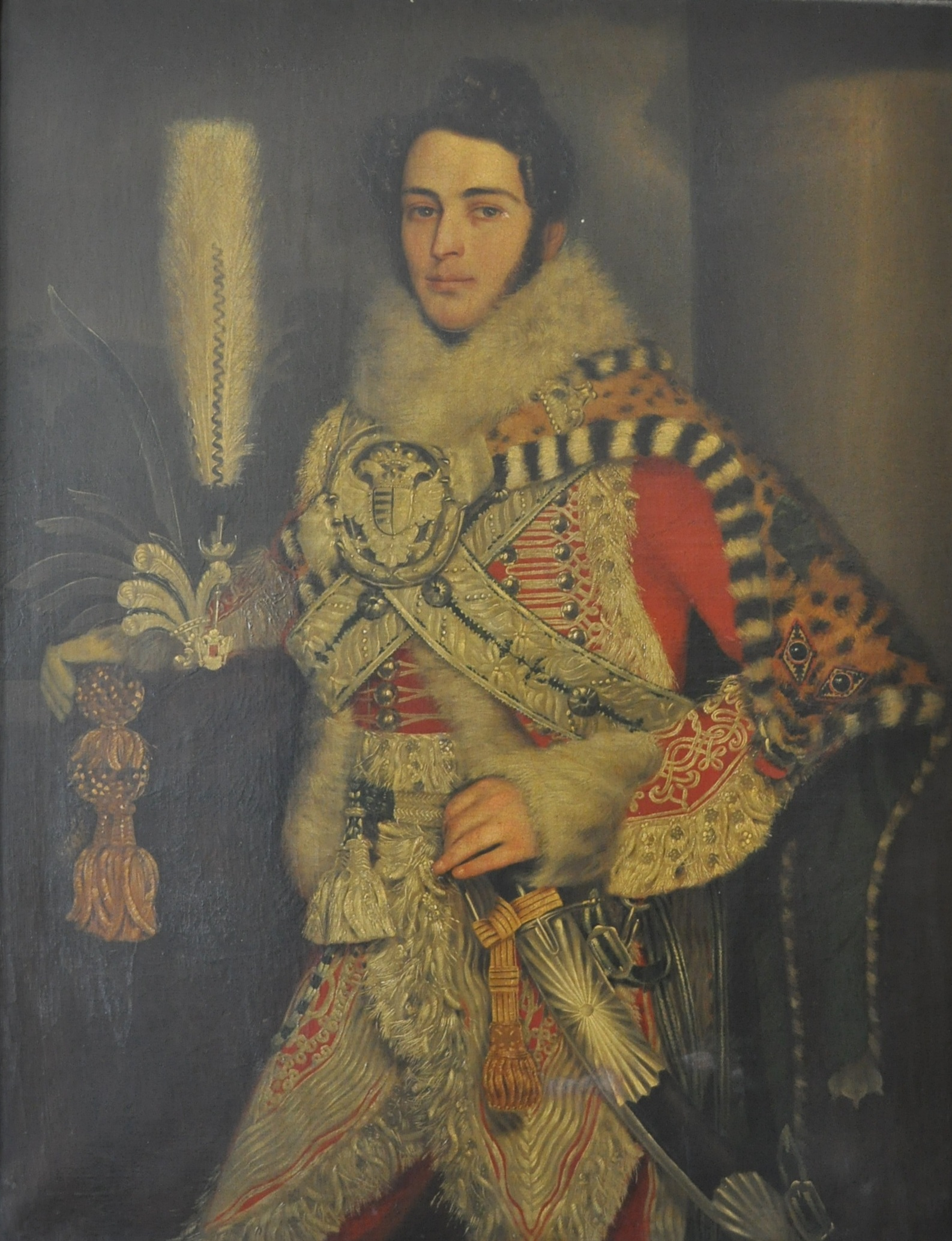
Kubinyi Tivadar, Hussar officer.

In addition, on this same table, concerning László, son of László by Erzsébet Puky, it may be noted that he lived in his castle at Tápió-Sz.-Márton in Pest County; and, being a great lover of art, especially music, he gathered the most distinguished artists of this field as guests in his hospitable home. He died in 1853. In accordance with his wishes, he was buried in his own garden.

Table V descends from Kristóf. One of Kristóf’s sons, László, fought against Thököly as a colonel, and after being wounded by the Kuruc forces at Osgyán on 27 September 1678, was taken to Putnok, where he died on 28 September 1678.

This branch might be called the Árva County branch after its place of residence and estates; however, from this branch Tivadar, son of Károly, an Imperial and Royal military officer, resides at Szügy in Nógrád County.

Deményfalvi line.

Kubinyi Benedek, Vicecount

The Deményfalvi line originates from Máté I, who was one of the representatives of Árva County at the Diet of Rákos in 1505. Máté left two sons: György and Benedek. The former, as mentioned above, began the lawsuit arising from the seizure of Gede Castle; but, dying during the proceedings, it was continued by his younger brother Benedek, who ultimately brought it to a conclusion. He also succeeded in having Feledy and his heirs condemned to compensate for the damages caused, assessed at 5,000 florins, and execution was directed against the shares of the Feledys’ estates situated at Geszteté, Feled, Kerek-Gede, Chona-Baracza and Almád. However, as the Kubinyis were still not satisfied, they continued to litigate with Feledy’s heirs until finally, in 1590, a settlement was reached before István Báthori, Judge of the Realm. According to this settlement, the Feledy heirs, namely Kristóf Lorántffy and his wife Margit Feledy, István Kis and his wife Anna Feledy, and Zsigmond Lorántffy, in place of the above-mentioned portions of estates, transferred to Benedek, the authorized representative of the Kubinyi family, the localities of Klenócz and Nustya, together with their share of the estate at Tiszolcz, as well as to Kristóf, son of Jakab shown in Table II, and to László, son of Kristóf I. In addition, both parties entered into a mutual inheritance agreement, according to which, in the event of extinction of the male line, the properties mentioned above were to be inherited by the other surviving male line.

It is appropriate here also to mention the family settlement which arose in 1658 between the Deményfalvi and Nagy-Olaszi branches of the Kubínyi family before Palatine Ferencz Vesselényi. According to this settlement, the Nagy-Olaszi branch renounced all its rights with regard to the estate of Várgede and likewise with regard to the localities of Hlinik and Csepfalva in Liptó County acquired from the Csemiczky family, and transferred them to the Deményfalvi branch. In return, the Deményfalvi branch renounced all its rights to the inheritance descending from Márk shown in Table I, as well as to those Feledy properties which were in the hands of Zsuzsanna Lorántffy, wife of György Rákóczy, Prince of Transylvania; the recovery of these properties was assigned as an obligation to this branch.

Benedek left two sons: Mihály and György.

From János, son of Mihály, who was a representative of Árva County in 1636 and 1646, descends the branch which may be called the Gömör County branch, shown in Table VI.

In this branch, József, grandson through Ádám’s son József, was Chief Justice of Gömör County when he was murdered in his castle at Várgede on 8 December 1813.

Menyhért, grandson of György through his son Sándor, had by his wife Mária Bartholomaeides a son, Illés, born at Klenócz in 1721. He studied at Wittenberg and, entering the clerical profession, became first minister at Csetnek, then at Taksony, from there at Rima-Brezó, at Pongyelok, and finally Evangelical minister at Osgyán. He died in 1768.

On János’s branch, Sándor, son of László by Eszter Pongrácz, was a distinguished advocate and wrote a legal work entitled Enchiridion Juris lexici (Pest, 1798). His two grandsons, Gyula and György, serve in the army.

Table VII shows the descendants of Mihály, son of János (shown in Table VI), by his wife Zsuzsanna Joób, and this branch may likewise, for the greater part, be called the Gömör County branch after its place of residence.

György, son of Mihály, together with Ádám shown in Table II, the husband of Borbála Plathy, litigated against Borbála Orlai, wife first of Count András Serényi and subsequently of Baron Péter Andrássy, concerning the castle of Záblath and the villages of Zablath and Ribári belonging to it in Trencsén County in 1700.

Also shown on this table is Miklós, son of András by Krisztina Farkas, born on 18 October 1775, formerly a celebrated advocate in Pest. He died in Pest on 7 August 1845 and was buried there in the Vác cemetery. He left no children by his wife Julianna Neszkovicz. The children of his brother András live in Gömör.

Table VIII, begun by Ferencz, representative of Liptó in 1646, likewise carries down a Gömör branch, namely the Várgede and Nustya branches. One of the said Ferencz’s sons, István, was Alispán of Hont County and royal tax assessor (dicator) in 1689.

Kubinyi Rudolf, Count of Gömör and Heves

Rudolf, son of János by Teréz Hellebront, was a representative of Gömör County in 1849.

Miklós, son of Péter by Anna Abaffy, was a Hussar captain in 1712. His wife was Mária Réthey. He died without issue. One of the sons of his brother Imre, also named Miklós, was in 1770, at the introduction of the regulated urbarial system, one of the commissioners sent to implement it in Kis-Hont County, and inspector of the schools in the Kis-Hont Evangelical seniorate. His son Péter earned distinction chiefly through his donations to the National Museum, amounting to 4,600 florins. In 1832 he received the title of Royal Councillor. He edited and printed the history and genealogical tree of his family in 1814, 1824 and, for the third time, in 1831. He died without issue. His brother Lajos was a representative of Gömör and Kis-Hont County in 1808.

Table IX is begun by Mátyás, a representative of Liptó in 1637. He had four wives; the third of them, Erzsébet Bakó, descended through the female line from the Kóváry family, which originated from the Hunt-Pázmán genus, and thereafter one branch of the family acquired estates belonging to the Kóváry family at Kóvár and Csalomja in Hont County. Imre-Zsigmond, grandson of Mátyás through his son Mátyás, was Chief Secretary of Gömör County from 1722 to 1731 and Alispán from 1731 to 1745. His brother Ádám was Alispán of Hont in 1709. One of his sons, Mátyás, was the representative of the Kis-Hont Evangelicals at the Synod of Eperjes in 1704. His wife was Zsuzsanna Palagyi, who, as a Jakóffy heiress, brought into the family a portion of the castle at Ráhó, together with portions of estates situated in eighteen localities belonging to it.

The aforementioned Mátyás’s brother Mihály, husband of Kata Dolinay, was a representative at the Evangelical Synod of Rozenberg. Among his descendants, Vilmos, son of János by Katalin Mártonffy, was born in 1802. He was Chief Tax Collector of Hont County from 1839 to 1842. He lived on his estate at Kóvár and later in Pest, where he died on 8 May 1855, at the age of 53. His children by his wife Emília Laszkáry were Ferencz-Vilmos, who made his name in the literary field, and Krisztina.

In general, the family—which I have here been able to present with a fairly complete genealogical table—belongs to those few families which remain in possession, even to the present day, of their most ancient estates, such as F.-Kubin, Nagy-Olaszi, etc. At Nagy-Olaszi, in the castle of Albert Kubinyi, there is a gallery adorned with numerous portraits of members of the family.

The genealogical tables may be viewed in the original Hungarian edition: Nagy, I. (1860). Magyarország családai, vol. VI. Pest: Ráth Mór, pp. 477–496.

== Prominent members of the family include ==
- Kubinyi Salamon (1355–1391), Knight, Commander in the army of Louis the Great of Hungary, Scholar (litteratus).
- Kubinyi II. László (1491–1513), Count of the Royal Chamber, Vice-Treasurer, Budai udvarbíró (provisor curiae castri Budensis).
- Kubinyi Máté (1497–1535), Vice-Count, and diplomat.
- Kubinyi Dániel (1497–1526), Commander of the Liptó banderium during the battle of Móhács.
- Kubinyi Kristóf (1527—1586), Director and Jurist of the Holy Crown (fiscalis Sacrae Coronae et director causarum regis), Warlord who fought at all major campaigns against the Ottomans.
- Kubinyi III. Laszlo (1573–1598), Secretary of War, Vice-Treasurer, Royal Chamberlain.
- Kubinyi IX. Sandor (1751–1799), Chief Treasurer of Lipto County, Lawyer and writer of the first Hungarian legal lexicon (Enchiridion Lexici Juris).
- Mesko Joseph, Baron von Mesko de Felsö-Kubinyi (1762–1815), Hungarian Hussar General during the Napoleonic Wars, Commander of the Military Order of Maria Theresa.
- Kubinyi Károly (1778—1829), Commander of the Árva county banderium during the war of the fifth coalition.
- Kubinyi IV. Károly (1812—1861), Commander of the Hungarian 52nd Infantry Battalion (and elements of the 34th) during the Hungarian Revolution of 1848, as well as defender of the city of Eger, and commander of the 95th Honvéd Battalion.
- Kubinyi Rudolf (1816–1896), Royal and Imperial Chancellor, Parliamentary Representative, Count of Gömör then Heves Counties.
- Kubinyi XXV. János (1830–1906), General of the Royal Hungarian Army, Knight of the Order of Leopold.
- Kubinyi II. Tivadar (1852–1935), General of the Royal Hungarian Army and Hussar Regiment.
- Kubinyi IX. Gyula (1877–1944), General of the Royal Hungarian Army.
- Kubinyi II. Ágoston (1799–1873), First Director of the Hungarian National Museum and one of the founding figures behind the establishment of the Budapest zoo.
- Kubinyi VIII. Ferenc (1796– 1874), Parliamentary representative, archeologist, palaeontologist, and geologist. Ferenc is one of the founding members of the Hungarian Geological Society, which is one of Europe's oldest scientific organisations, founded in 1848.
- Kubinyi XVIII. György (1868–1947), Imperial and Royal Chamberlain, Guardian of the Holy Crown (koronaőr).
- Count Kubinyi Victor (1873–1966), Knight of the Sovereign Military Order of Malta, godson of Emperor Franz Joseph, author, painter, and lecturer.

Kubinyi is a surname of Hungarian origin. Other persons with the surname include:

- Eniko Kubinyi (born 1976), Hungarian biologist
- Frigyes Kubinyi (1909–1948), Hungarian boxer
- Kálmán Kubinyi (1906–1973), American artist
