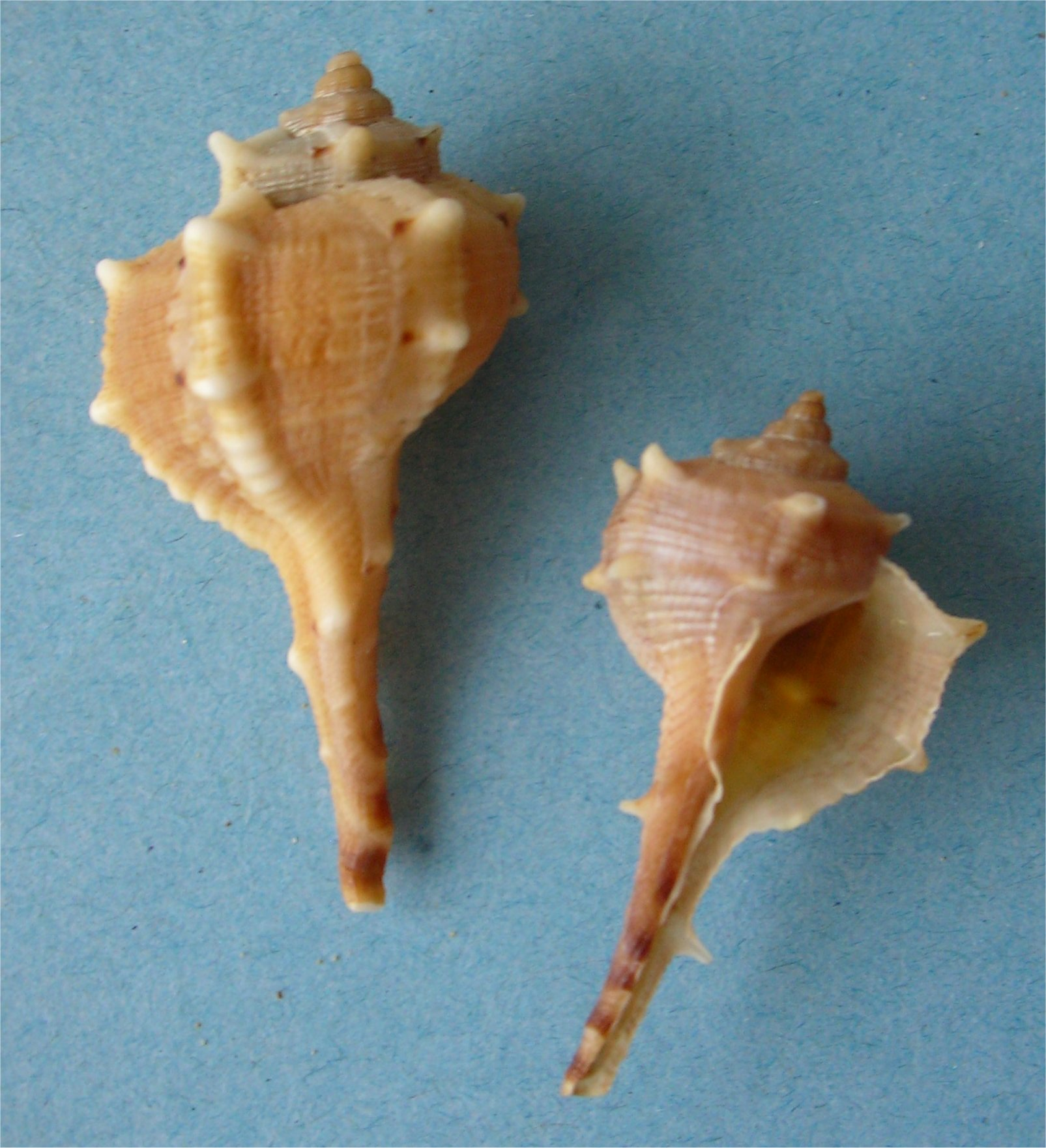
- Two shells of the spiny dye-murex, Bolinus brandaris

Scientific classification
- Kingdom: Animalia
- Phylum: Mollusca
- Class: Gastropoda
- Subclass: Caenogastropoda
- Order: Neogastropoda
- Superfamily: Muricoidea
- Family: Muricidae
- Subfamily: Muricinae
- Genus: Bolinus; Pusch, 1837

Type species
- Murex brandaris Linnaeus, 1758

Synonyms
- Brandaria Monterosato, 1917; Murex (Bolinus) Pusch, 1837; Purpura Jousseaume, 1880

= Bolinus =

Bolinus Temporal range: Miocene - Recent

Genus of gastropods

Bolinus is a genus of sea snails, marine gastropod mollusks in the family Muricidae, the murex snails or rock snails.

This genus is known in the fossil record from the Miocene to the Pliocene period (age range: from 15.97 to 2.588 million years ago.). Fossil shells within this genus have been found in Cyprus, Austria, Italy and Turkey.

Some species of these molluscs were known since ancient times as a source for purple dye and also as a popular food source.

== Description ==
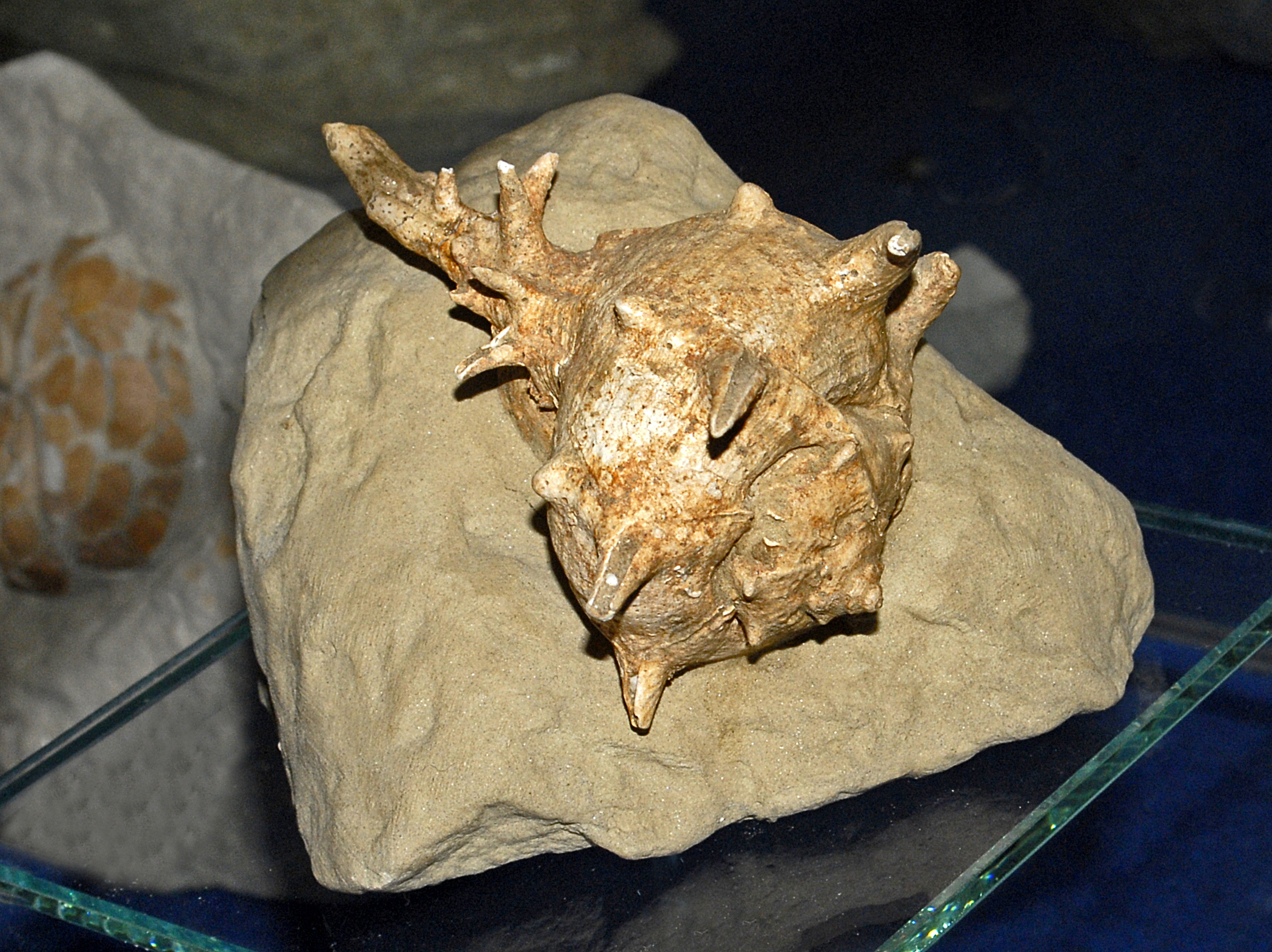
Fossil shell of Bolinus brandaris torularius from Pliocene

The adult shells of Bolinus species can reach a size of about 60–200 millimetres (2.4–7.9 in). They are usually pale or golden brown, thick and spiny with a long and straight siphonal canal and a rounded and broad body whorl.

They are carnivorous and predatory

== Distribution ==
Snails within this genus mainly live along the Atlantic coast of Africa and in the Mediterranean Sea.

== Habitat ==
They inhabit shallow water and prefer gravelled or rocky substrate.

== Species ==
Species within the genus Bolinus include:

- Bolinus brandaris (Linnaeus, 1758)
- Bolinus cornutus (Linnaeus, 1758)

Bolinus Brandaris Nivea Bucquoy, Dautzenberg & Dollfus, 1882

brandaris form trispinosus Locard 1886

Bolinus brandaris longispinus Coen 1914

brandaris form coronatus

brandaris form trituberculatus

brandaris form bicaudatus

brandaris form cagliaritanus

brandaris form brevis

brandaris form polii

brandaris form elongata

brandaris form coronatus x polii

brandaris form varicosus

brandaris form rubiginosus

Stigwan & Fabiod 2019
