= Agoston Kubinyi =

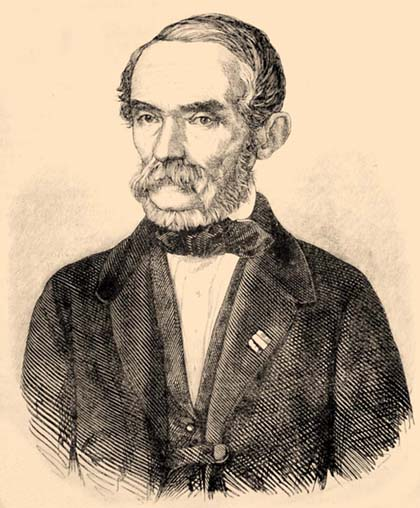
A portrait of Kubinyi from 1857

Ágoston Imre Kubinyi (30 May 1799 – 19 September 1873) was a Hungarian nobleman, patron of the arts and the first director of the National Museum of Hungary.

Kubinyi was born in Videfalva where, along with his brother Ferenc, he took an interest studying plants and birds. He studied rhetoric, poetry, science and mathematics at Debreczen. He joined the University of Pest in 1815 and studied philosophy, herbalism, diplomacy, numismatics and archaeology. Graduating in 1819, he worked as a clerk to a judge and became a notary in Nógrád County in 1921. He founded a library and took an interest in meetings of naturalists, physicians and corresponded with foreign scientific societies. He was appointed director of the Hungarian National Museum in 1842. He became a Royal Counselor in 1845. In 1851, along with his brother, he organized a geological society. When the library of the city of Losoncz was destroyed by Russians in 1849, he helped rebuild the library. The Hungarian Museum was visited by King József Ferencz in 1857 and was rewarded with a diamond ring and appointed chamberlain. He retired from the directorship of the museum in 1869 and was awarded an Order of the Iron Crown. He lived in quiet isolation thereafter and died at Tápiószentmárton.
