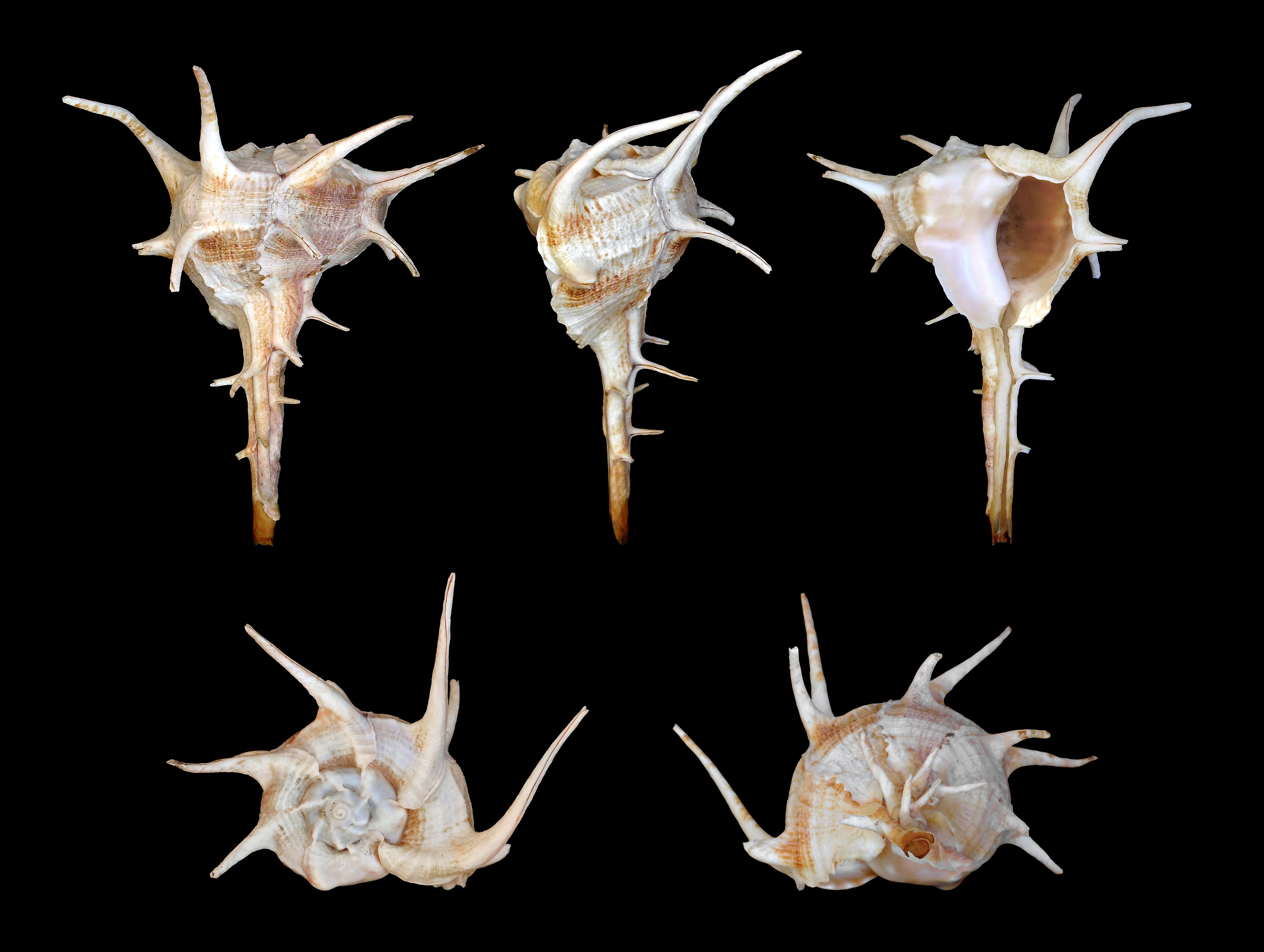
- Five views of a shell of B. cornutus from Mauritania

Scientific classification
- Kingdom: Animalia
- Phylum: Mollusca
- Class: Gastropoda
- Subclass: Caenogastropoda
- Order: Neogastropoda
- Family: Muricidae
- Genus: Bolinus
- Species: B. cornutus

Binomial name
- Bolinus cornutus (Linnaeus, 1758)

Synonyms
- Aranea conspicua Perry, 1811; Murex (Bolinus) cornutus (Linnaeus, 1758); Murex cornutus Linnaeus, 1758; Murex tumulosus Sowerby II, 1841

= Bolinus cornutus =

Species of gastropod

Bolinus cornutus, or horned murex, is a predatory species of sea snail, a marine gastropod mollusk in the family Muricidae, the murex or rock snails. This species is common along the west coast of Africa, where it prefers moderately shallow waters. The shell of the snail is distinctively large, spiny, and club-shaped, usually pale brown or tan in colour, with an elongated and straight siphonal canal.

== Description ==
Bolinus cornutus inhabits moderately shallow waters and prefers gravelled or rocky substrate. It is carnivorous and predatory.

Although not as widely utilised as other murex species, such as Bolinus brandaris, Bolinus cornutus is one of the sea snail species from which a rich purple dye, generally referred to as Tyrian purple, can be extracted. The dye is a mucus from the snail's hypobranchial gland, which is secreted for defence and as an aid in predation.

Bolinus cornutus is protected by a large, thick, spiny shell, club-shaped and with a broad body whorl. The maximum length of the shell is approximately 200 millimetres. Its spire is low and the body whorl has six or seven varices, each varix forming two long, hollow spines. Short spines also spiral off the long, straight siphonal canal of the shell, which is narrowly open along its length. The buff or tan shell colour is interrupted on the body whorl by three darker brown spiral bands, spaced evenly. The majority of the ovate aperture of the shell is white, with an "apricot" shade on the lip edge, the inductura, and the parietal callus. Most of the outer surface of the shell is rough in texture.

== Distribution ==
Bolinus cornutus is found along the Atlantic coast of Africa; it is not an uncommon species.
