= Lukas Pusch =

Austrian artist

Lukas Pusch (born 1970) is an Austrian artist based in Vienna and Siberia. He studied painting at the University of Applied Arts Vienna, Surikov Institut in Moscow and the Dresden Academy of Fine Arts.

== Works ==
Pusch artworks includes paintings, objects, films and performances. 2007 he founded SLUM-TV together with Sam Hopkins and Alexander Nikolic in Mathare. 2008 he opened the White Cube Gallery Novosibirsk. It was the first and in that time only center of contemporary art in Siberia in form of an iron garage.

== Solo exhibitions (selection) ==
- 2011: „Neues Tahiti", Galerie Ernst Hilger, Vienna
- 2011: „Die PRESSE Mappe", Albertina
- 2009: „Kaiserwalzer", Buchhandlung Walther König, MQ, Vienna
- 2008: „Hommage an Bianca Lehrer", Galerie Phillip Konzett, Vienna
- 2008: „Kaiserwalzer", Kunst und Antiquitätenmesse, Hofburg, Vienna
- 2007: „Vienna Voodoo", Galerie Phillip Konzett, Vienna
- 2006: „5 Jahre kein Sex", SWINGR, raumaufzeit, Vienna
- 2005: „Neue Arbeiten", endart, Berlin
- 2005: „Berliner Mappe", Buchhandlung Walther König, Cologne

== Group exhibitions (selection) ==
- 2011: „Schöne Aussichten", House on the Embankment, special project of the 4th Moscow Biennale curated by Simon Mraz and Peter Weibel
- 2010: „Lebt und arbeitet in Wien III", Kunsthalle Wien
- 2009: „Fake Reality", Donaufestival, Krems
- 2009: 7th Krasnojarsk Museums Biennale
- 2008: „Kunscht isch gäng es Risiko", Kunsthalle Luzern
- 2007: 5th International Graphic art Biennale Nowosibirsk
- 2006: „Economy Class", Alliance francaise de Nairobi, Kenya

== Publications and catalogues ==
- „Kunst und Politik", Samizdat, Vienna 1996
- „CRASH", Verlag der Buchhandlung Walther König, Cologne 2008
- „Afrika", Verlag der Buchhandlung Walther König, Cologne 2008
- „Kaiserwalzer", Verlag der Buchhandlung Walther König, Cologne 2009
- „Lukas Pusch 2", Galerie Ernst Hilger, 2010

== Selected works in public collections ==
- Albertina, Vienna; Wien Museum, Vienna.
