= Vidiná =

Vidiná Videfalva
- Municipality
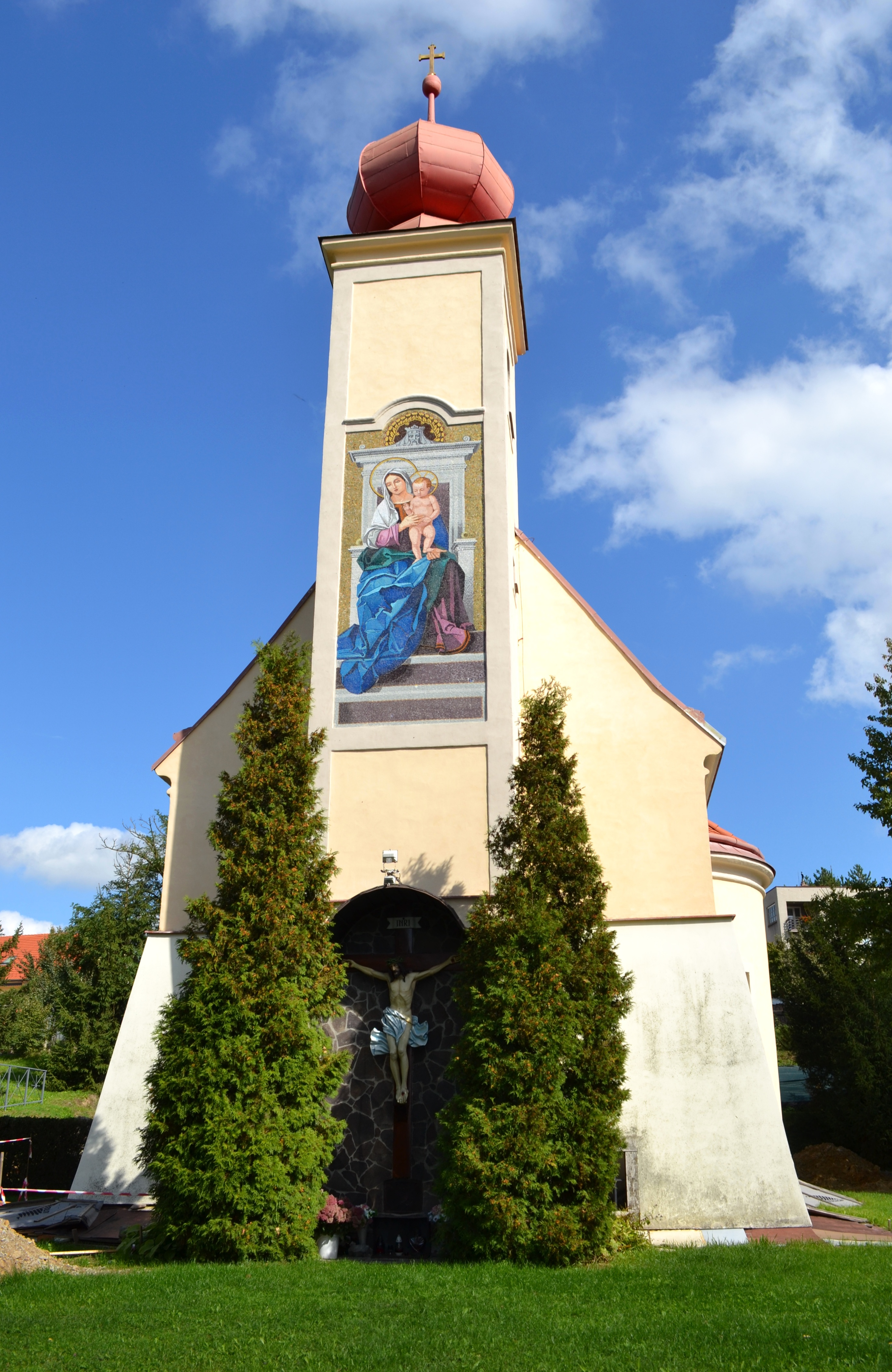
- Sacred Heart church

- Flag

- Location of Vidiná in the Banská Bystrica Region Location of Vidiná in Slovakia
- Coordinates: 48.37°N 19.65°E
- Country: Slovakia
- Region: Banská Bystrica Region
- District: Lučenec District
- First mentioned: 1335

Area
  - Total: 5.47 km^{2} (2.11 sq mi)
- Elevation: 198 m (650 ft)

Population (2025)
  - Total: 1,692
- Time zone: UTC+1 (CET)
  - Summer (DST): UTC+2 (CEST)
- Postal code: 985 59
- Area code: +421 47
- Vehicle registration plate (until 2022): LC
- Website: www.vidina.sk

Vidiná (Hungarian: Videfalva) is a village and municipality in the Lučenec District in the Banská Bystrica Region of Slovakia.

== Geography ==
The municipality lies at an altitude of 198 metres (650 ft) and covers an area of 5.47 km^{2} (2.11 sq mi) (2025).

== Population ==
Population statistic (10 years)
Year	1995	2005	2015	2025
Count	1736	1845	1807	1692
Difference		+6.27%	−2.05%	−6.36%

Population statistic
Year	2024	2025
Count	1704	1692
Difference		−0.70%

It has a population of 1692 people (31 December 2025).

=== Ethnicity ===
Census 2021 (1+ %)
Ethnicity	Number	Fraction
Slovak	1591	93.91%
Not found out	66	3.89%
Hungarian	48	2.83%
Total	1694	

In year 2021 was 1694 people by ethnicity 1591 as Slovak, 66 as Not found out, 48 as Hungarian, 12 as Czech, 6 as Other, 3 as Russian, 2 as Ukrainian, 2 as Romani, 1 as Polish, 1 as Greek and 1 as Bulgarian.

Note on population: The difference values of population numbers in the table "Population statistic" and in the sections "Ethnicity" & "Religion" is caused by the use of various statistical methods.

=== Religion ===
Census 2021 (1+ %)
Religion	Number	Fraction
Roman Catholic Church	827	48.82%
None	493	29.1%
Evangelical Church	257	15.17%
Not found out	69	4.07%
Total	1694	

In year 2021 was 1694 people by religion 827 from Roman Catholic Church, 493 from None, 257 from Evangelical Church, 69 from Not found out, 10 from Paganism and natural spirituality, 10 from Greek Catholic Church, 6 from Other, 6 from Ad hoc movements, 4 from United Methodist Church, 3 from Hinduism, 2 from Buddhism, 1 from Calvinist Church, 1 from Eastern Orthodox Church, 1 from Other and not ascertained christian church, 1 from Islam, 1 from Czechoslovak Hussite Church, 1 from Seventh-day Adventist Church and 1 from Apostolic Church.
