= Georg Gottlieb Pusch =

German geologist (1790–1846)

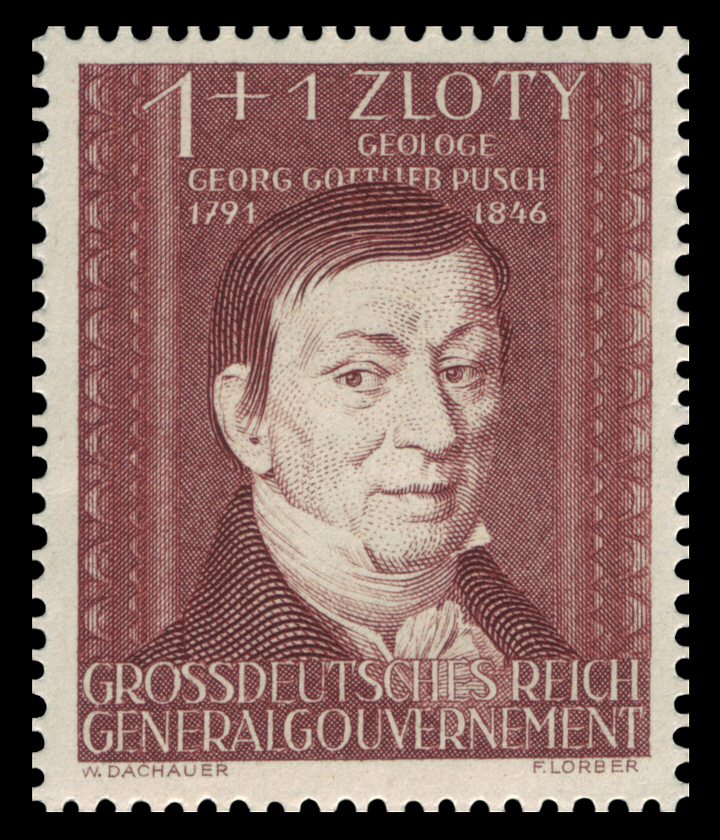
Georg Gottlieb Pusch

Georg Gottlieb Pusch or in Polish Jerzy Bogumił Pusz (15 December 1790, Kohren - 2.October 1846, Warsaw) was a German geologist. He wrote Geognostischer Katechismus oder Anweisung zum praktischen Geognosiren für angehende Bergleute und Geognosten Craz und Gerlach., Freiburg 1819., 212 S

== Taxa ==
Pusch described

- Gigantopecten nodosiformis (Pusch, 1837)
- Bolinus (Pusch, 1837)
- Hydrobia inflata (Pusch, 1837)

in Pusch, G. G., 1837 Polens Paläontologie : oder, Abbildung und Beschreibung der vorzüglichsten und der noch unbeschriebenen Petrefakten aus den Gebirgsformationen in Polen, Volhynien und den Karpathen nebst einigen allgemeinen Beiträgen zur Petrefaktenkunde und einem Versuch zur Vervollständigung der Geschechte des europäischen Auer-Ochsen Stuttgart : E. Schweizerbart's Verlagshandlung, 1837.
